= Reza =

- Pronunciation: Persian: [ɾeˈzɒː]
- Gender: Male
- Language: Persian

Origin
- Origin: Arabic
- Meaning: Fulfillment, Gratitude, Triumph, Gratification, Delight, Rejoicing

Other names
- Variant form: Aza
- Nickname: Aza

Reza (Persian: رضا, romanized: Rezâ) is the Persian variant of the Arabic name Rida, which literally means "the fact of being pleased or contented; contentment, approval". It is one of the most widely used names in Iran.

According to Annemarie Schimmel, "riḍā is closely related to shukr"; "shukr" is an Arabic term denoting thankfulness and gratitude. In Islam, rida is interpreted as satisfaction or "perfect contentment with God's will or decree".

== Given name ==
=== Religion ===
- Ali Reza, the Iranian Persian name for Ali al-Rida, eighth Twelver Shi'a Imam

=== Academics ===
- Reza Afshari, Iranian historian
- Reza Davari Ardakani, Iranian philosopher
- Reza Derakhshani, Iranian-born American inventor, computer scientist
- Reza Ghadiri, Iranian-American chemist
- Reza Iravani, Iranian academic
- Reza Malekzadeh, Iranian physician
- Reza Mansouri, Iranian physicist
- Reza Olfati-Saber, Iranian roboticist
- Reza Aslan, Iranian-American scholar, author, and journalist
- Reza Moridi, Canadian politician
- Reza Negarestani, Iranian-American Philosopher
- Reza Zadeh, American-Canadian-Iranian Computer Scientist
- Mohammad Ali Reza Khan, Bangladeshi ornithologist

=== Arts ===
- Reza Abbasi (1565–1635), a Persian painter
- Reza Abdoh (1963-1995), Iranian-born American director
- Reza Abedini, Iranian designer
- Reza Allamehzadeh, Persian-born Dutch film-maker
- Reza Amirkhani, Persian novelist
- Reza Arham Sadr (1923–2008), Iranian actor
- Reza Badiyi (1930–2011), American film director
- Reza Baraheni (1935–2022), Iranian novelist
- Reza Borchardt, American magician
- Reza Deghati, professionally known as Reza, an Iranian-born photojournalist
- Reza Fayazi, Iranian film director
- Reza Feiz Noroozi, Iranian actor
- Reza Kianian, Iranian actor
- Reza Mafi (1943–1982), Iranian calligrapher
- Reza Naji, Iranian actor
- Reza Parsa, Swedish film director
- Reza Qolikhan Hedayat (1800–1871), Persian writer
- Reza Rahadian Matulessy (born 1987), Indonesian actor
- Reza Sadeghi, Iranian pop singer
- Reza Samani, Iranian musician
- Reza Shafiei Jam, Iranian actor
- Reza Shah-Kazemi, British author
- Reza Vohdani (1933–2003), Iranian musician
- Reza Yazdani (singer)
- Reza Latif, Bangladeshi film director, producer, and cinematographer
- Amitabh Reza Chowdhury, Bangladeshi filmmaker

=== Criminals ===
- Agha Muhammad Reza Baig, Iranian Shia Muslim who claimed to be the Mahdi and twelfth imam, engaged in battles against the East India Company and Kachari Kingdom.
- Reza Alinejad, Iranian juvenile offender
- Reza Khan, Afghan Islamist
- Reza Zarrab, Iranian businessman

=== Politics ===
- A. I. M. Mostofa Reza Nur, Bangladeshi lieutenant general
- A. K. Mohammad Salim Reza Habib, Bangladeshi politician
- Mohammad Reza Khan, Bangladeshi politician
- Reza Ahmed Bachu, Bangladeshi politician
- Reza Ali (1940–2023), Bangladeshi politician
- Reza Asghari (born 1964), Iranian-German economist and politician
- Reza Fallah (1909–1982), Iranian businessman and political advisor
- Reza Ghotbi (1938–2024), Iranian politician
- Reza Khelili Dylami, Swedish politician
- Reza Moridi, Canadian politician
- Reza Ostadi, Iranian politician
- Reza Pahlavi, last crown prince of the former Imperial State of Iran
- Reza Saumtally, Mauritian politician
- Reza Shah Pahlavi, Shah of Iran
- Reza Zanjani (1902–1984), Iranian politician
- Reza Zarei, Iranian military commander
- Syed Ahmed Reza Hossain, Bangladeshi politician

=== Sports ===
- Reza Ahadi (1962–2016), Iranian footballer
- Reza Chahkhandagh, Iranian judoka
- Reza Enayati, Iranian footballer
- Reza Ghoochannejhad, Iranian-Dutch footballer
- Reza Hassanzadeh (disambiguation), multiple Iranian footballers
- Reza Jabbari, Iranian footballer
- Reza Khaleghifar, Iranian footballer
- Reza Niknazar, Iranian footballer
- Reza Sahebi, Iranian footballer
- Reza Soukhteh Saraei, Iranian wrestler
- Reza Shahroudi, Iranian footballer
- Reza Talabeh, Iranian footballer
- Reza Torabian, Iranian footballer
- Reza Vatankhah, Iranian footballer
- Reza Yazdani, Iranian wrestler

== Compound names with Reza as an element ==
=== Given names ===
==== Abu Reza ====
- Abu Reza Fazlul Haque Bablu, Bangladeshi politician
- Abu Reza Muhammad Nezamuddin (born 1968), Bangladeshi scholar and politician

==== Abdolreza ====
- People with the theophoric given name.

==== Ali Reza ====
- People with the given name, after Ali Reza (765–818), Imam and eight descendant of the Islamic prophet Muhammad.

==== Gholam Reza ====
- People with the given name, meaning servant of the contented one

==== Mohammad-Reza ====
- People with the given name, after Mohammad Reza (1919–1980), the last Shah of Iran.

==== Reza-ul ====
- Rezaul Alam Khandaker, Bangladeshi politician
- Rezaul Bari Dina (1951–2014), Bangladeshi politician
- Rezauddin Stalin (born 1962), Bangladeshi poet and television personality
- Md. Rezaul Hasan (born 1962), High Court Division Judge
- Reza-ul-Haque, multiple people
- Mullah Rezaul Islam, Bangladeshi politician
- Rezaul Karim, multiple people
- A. K. Mohammad Rezaul Majid, Bangladeshi major general

==== Ur-Reza ====
- Abidur Reza Chowdhury (1872–1961), Bengali politician and educationist
- Abidur Reza Khan (1927–2005), Bangladeshi politician
- Mainur Reza Chowdhury (1938–2004), 12th Chief Justice of Bangladesh
- Jamilur Reza Choudhury (1942–2020), Bangladeshi academic
- Faridur Reza Sagar (born 1955), Bangladeshi writer and film producer
- Hashibur Reza Kallol, Bangladeshi film director

=== Surnames ===
- Rezaei

== Surname ==
- Afgansyah Reza (born 1989), Indonesian singer, songwriter, and actor
- Ahmereen Reza (born 1961), British-Pakistani architect, social worker and political activist
- Amaan Reza (born 1986), Bangladeshi film actor
- Fahmi Reza, Malaysian political graphic designer, street artist and documentary film maker
- Farhad Reza (born 1986), Bangladeshi cricketer
- Fazlollah Reza (1915–2019), Iranian academic
- Kévin Reza (born 1988), French professional road bicycle racer
- Liudvikas Rėza (1776–1840), Prussian-Lithuanian author a.k.a. Ludwig Rhesa
- Masum Reza, Bangladeshi playwright, television drama and stage play director
- M. A. Reza (born 1947), Bangladeshi politician
- Parisa Reza (born 1965), Iranian-French writer of The Gardens of Consolation
- Raafi Reza (born 1999), Bangladeshi footballer
- Sumon Reza (born 1995), Bangladeshi footballer
- Syed Masud Reza (born 1956), Bangladeshi politician
- Syed Shahed Reza, Bangladeshi civil servant
- Waliur Rahman Reza (1940–2020), Bangladeshi politician and journalist
- Yasmina Reza (born 1959), Iranian-French playwright

=== Spanish surname ===
- Itzel Reza, Mexican sprint canoer
- Lilia Merodio Reza (born 1978), Mexican politician

== Fictional characters ==
- Reza, character in Gol & Gincu television series
- Reza Temiz, character in Dreamfall: The Longest Journey game
- Reza, a pyromancer in the mobile MOBA game Vainglory
- Reza Houshmanzadeh, a vampire from the 70s in the visual novel Vampire Therapist

== See also ==
- Ressa
- Rayzha
- Reza Construction Ltd
- Shamim Reza Rubel murder
