= Rida (name) =

Arabic name

- Pronunciation: Arabic: [ˈrɪdˁaː]
- Gender: Male
- Language: Arabic

Other names
- Related names: Reza, Rıza, Rza, Raza

Rida (Arabic: رضا, romanized: Riḍā, also transcribed as Ridha, Reda, Redha or Roda) is an Arabic name which literally means "the fact of being pleased or contented; contentment, approval". In the Arab world, the name is neutral and not one used only by a particular sect, and is used widely by Arab Christians and Arab Druze. According to Annemarie Schimmel, "riḍā is closely related to shukr"; "shukr" is an Arabic term denoting thankfulness and gratitude.

The Iranian Persian version of this name is Reza, the Turkish one is Rıza, the Azerbaijani one is Riza and the Urdu one is Raza.

== People ==
- Ali al-Rida, eighth Twelver Shi'a Imam

=== Rida, Ridha, Reda, Redha, Roda ===
- Rida Al Abdullah, Iraqi singer
- Rida Lah Douliazale, Moroccan footballer
- Rida al-Rikabi, Syrian politician
- Rida Said, Syrian physician
- Rida Zouhir, Canadian soccer player
- Ridha Behi, Tunisian director and producer
- Ridha Belhaj (politician), Tunisian politician
- Ridha Belkadi, Tunisian chess player
- Ridha Charfeddine, Tunisian politician
- Ridha Grira, Tunisian politician
- Ridha Jalil, Iraqi footballer
- Ridha Jawad Taqi, Iraqi politician
- Ridha Jlassi, Tunisian football supporter
- Ridha Rouatbi, Tunisian footballer
- Ridha Saidi, Tunisian politician
- Reda Aadel, Moroccan cyclist
- Reda Abdel Aal, Egyptian football player and coach
- Réda Abdenouz, Algerian athlete
- Reda Acimi, Algerian football player
- Reda Agourram, Moroccan born-Canadian football player
- Reda El Amrani, Moroccan tennis player
- Reda El Azab, Egyptian football player
- Réda Babouche, Algerian football player
- Reda El-Batoty, Egyptian weightlifter
- Reda Bellahcene, French football player
- Reda Benbaziz, Algerian boxer
- Reda Benchehima, Algerian fence
- Réda Benzine, Algerian athlete
- Reda Boultam, Dutch football player
- Reda Benhadj Djillali, Algerian football player
- Reda Doumaz, Algerian musical artist
- Reda Ereyahi, Moroccan football player
- Reda Haikal, Egyptian volleyball player
- Reda Hajhouj, Moroccan football player
- Reda Hegazy, Egyptian politician
- Reda Helal, Egyptian journalist
- Reda Jaadi, Belgium-born Moroccan football player
- Reda Kateb, French actor
- Reda Khadra, German football player
- Reda Kharchouch, Dutch football player
- Reda Mansour, Israeli historian and diplomat
- Reda Mahmoud Hafez Mohamed, Egyptian Air Force officer
- Reda Rhalimi, Moroccan basketball player
- Réda Sayah, Algerian football player
- Reda Seyam, German-Egyptian militant
- Reda Shehata, Egyptian football player
- Reda Slim, Moroccan football player
- Reda Al Tawarghi, Libyan football player
- Reda Wardi, French rugby union player
- Reda El-Weshi, Egyptian football player
- Reda Yadi, Algerian swimmer
- Reda Zeguili, Algerian handball coach
- Redha Hamiani, Algerian politician
- Redha Malek, Algerian Former Prime Minister
- Redha al-Najar, Tunisian prisoner
- Redha Tukar, Saudi Arabian footballer
- Roda Antar, Lebanese footballer

=== Rıza (Turkish) ===
- Rıza Çalımbay, Turkish footballer
- Rıza Doğan
- Rıza Maksut İşman
- Rıza Kayaalp (born 1989), Turkish wrestler
- Rıza Kocaoğlu
- Rıza Nur, Turkish politician
- Rıza Şen, Turkish footballer
- Rıza Tevfik Bölükbaşı
- Rıza Türmen (born 1941), Turkish judge and politician
- Rıza Tuyuran, Turkish footballer
- Rıza Yıldırım (born 1987), Turkish wrestler

=== Rza (Azerbaijani) ===
- Rza Tahmasib
- Rza Valibeyov

=== Raza (Urdu) ===
- Raza Saqib Mustafai
- Ahmed Raza Khan

== Surname ==
- Ghaleb Rida, Lebanese basketball player
- Hadem Rida, Palestinian politician
- Rashid Rida, Syrian scholar
- Mahmoud Reda, Egyptian dancer and choreographer
- Hanan Redha, Bahraini singer
- Alexander Ridha, German-Iraqi music producer
- Haisam Rida, Ghanaian jiujitsu athlete
