= Rezaei =

Rezaei may refer to:

== People ==
- Rezai family (four brothers: Ali, Mahmood, Abbas and Ghassem), a powerful family in 1970s Iran
- Abbas Mohammadrezaei, Iranian footballer
- Alireza Rezaei, Iranian wrestler
- Aravane Rezaï, Iranian-French tennis player
- Fariba Rezayee, Afghan judoka
- Ghasem Rezaei, Iranian wrestler
- Haji Rezai, Iranian judge
- Kaveh Rezaei, Iranian footballer
- Mohammad Rezaei (disambiguation)
  - Mohammad Rezaei (wrestler, born 1958), Iranian wrestler
  - Mohammad Rezaei (wrestler, born 1978), Iranian wrestler
- Mohammad Nabi Rezaei, Iranian canoeist
- Mohsen Rezaee, Iranian politician
- Rahman Rezaei, Iranian footballer
- Shah Gul Rezai, Afghan politician
- Shaima Rezayee, Afghan television presenter
- Sheys Rezaei, Iranian footballer
- Zabihollah Rezaee, Iranian-American accountancy professor
- Zakria Rezai, Afghan footballer

== Places ==
- Rezayi, Hormozgan, Iran
- Rezayi, Lorestan, Iran
