= Aza (given name) =

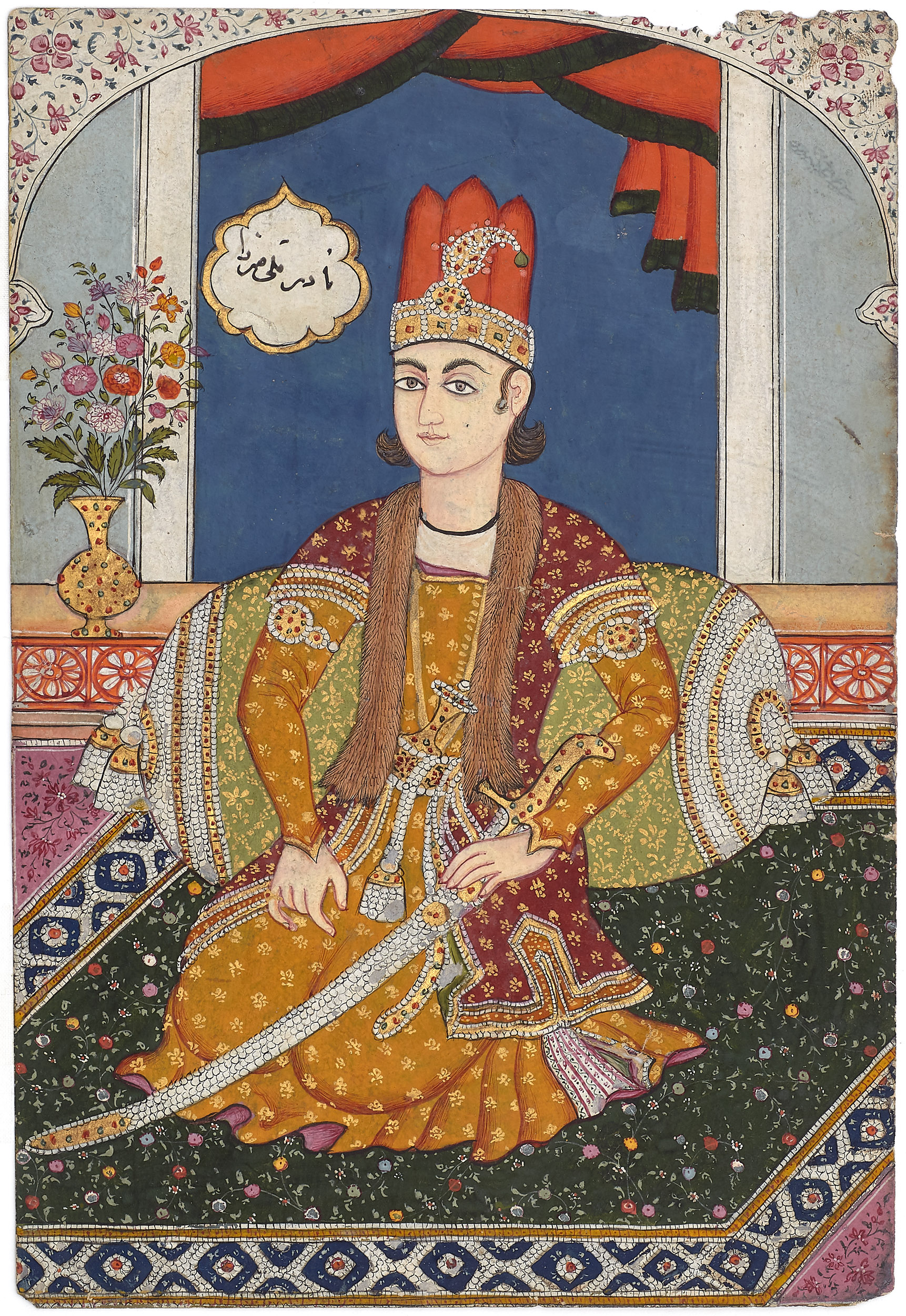
- Reza Qoli Mirza Afshar, 19th century in Lucknow
- Pronunciation: azā
- Gender: Male

Origin
- Meaning: Triumph, victory, delight, rejoicing, gratitude
- Region of origin: Persian Empire

Other names
- Variant forms: Aza Ali, Reza Ali, Riza Ali
- Related names: Reza

Aza is a given name in several parts of the world. In English, the usual pronunciation is azā (ah-zah). The name is a modern form of the Persian name Reza. It is also an Arabic name meaning “one who provides comfort”.

== Given name ==
- Aza of Mannea, king, reigned c. 710–700 BC
- Aza Gazgireyeva (1954–2009), Ingush supreme court justice
- Aza Habalova (born 1958), South Ossetian politician
- Aza Petrović (born 1959), Croatian basketball coach
- Aza Rakhmanova (1932–2015), Russian AIDS and hepatitis expert
- Aza Raskin (born 1984), American writer, entrepreneur, inventor
- Aza Takho-Godi (1922–2025), Russian philologist
