= Ashab Uddin =

Ashab Uddin may refer to:

- Ashab Uddin (politician)
- Ashab Uddin (general)

== See also ==
- Ashab Uddin Ahmad, Bangladeshi writer, educator and politician
