= Redha =

Redha may refer to:

- Rida (name), a given name and surname
- Redha (film), or Beautiful Pain, a 2016 Malaysian film
