= Amir al-Mu'minin =

Supreme leader of Islamic community

Amir al-Mu'minin (Arabic: أَمِيرُ المُؤمِنِين, romanized: ʾAmīr al-Muʾminīn), or Leader of the Believers (also translated as Leader of the Faithful), is a politico-religious title in Islamic history denoting supreme leadership over the Muslim community (ummah). The term combines amīr (lit. 'commander, leader') with al-muʾminīn (lit. 'the believers'), thereby signifying authority that is simultaneously military, administrative, judicial, and moral in nature.

== Etymology ==
Although etymologically ʾamīr (Arabic: أَمِير) is equivalent to English "leader, commander", the wide variety of its historical and modern use allows for a range of translations. The historian H. A. R. Gibb, however, counsels against the translation "Prince of the Believers" as "neither philologically nor historically correct".

== History ==
The title ʾamīr was used for Muslim military commanders during the lifetime of the Islamic prophet Muhammad. It was, for example, borne by the Muslim commander at the Battle of al-Qadisiyya. On his accession in 634, the second caliph Umar (r. 634–644) adopted the title. This was likely not for its military connotation, but rather deriving from a Quranic injunction to "Obey God and obey the Apostle and those invested with command among you" (Surah 4, verses 58–62).

According to Fred M. Donner, the title's adoption marked a step in the centralization of the nascent Muslim state, as the ʾAmīr al-Muʾminīn was acknowledged as the central authority of the expanding Muslim empire, responsible for appointing and dismissing generals and governors, taking major political decisions, and keeping the dīwān (Arabic: دیوان), the list of those Muslims entitled to a share of the spoils of conquest. From Umar on, the title became a fixed part of caliphal titulature. Indeed, it appears to have been the chief title of the early caliphs, and the actual title of caliph (Arabic: خليفة, romanized: khalifa, lit. 'successor') does not appear to have been adopted until the reign of the Umayyad caliph Abd al-Malik ibn Marwan (r. 685–705), who adopted it as a means to strengthen his position, which had become shaky following the Second Fitna.

Among Sunnis, the adoption of the title of ʾAmīr al-Muʾminīn became virtually tantamount to claiming the caliphate. As a result, the title was used by the great Islamic dynasties that claimed the universal leadership over the Muslim community; the Umayyads, Abbasids, and Fatimids. In later centuries, it was also adopted by regional rulers, especially in the western parts of the Muslim world, who used the caliphal rank to emphasize their independent authority and legitimacy, rather than any ecumenical claim. The Umayyads of Cordoba adopted it in 928, whence it was also used by several other minor rulers of al-Andalus. From 1253, the Hafsids of Ifriqiya claimed the caliphate, and were followed by the Marinids of Morocco, following whom all successive Moroccan dynasties—the last two of them, the Sa'di dynasty and the current Alawi dynasty, also by virtue of their claimed descent from Muhammad—have also claimed it. The Constitution of Morocco still uses the term ʾAmīr al-Muʾminīn as the principal title of the King of Morocco, as a means to "[legitimize the monarchy's] hegemonic role and its position outside significant constitutional restraint".

The Sultan of Sokoto's autochthonous title is Sarkin Musulmi, which has the same meaning in Hausa, and thus leads to that office being described as a caliphate in outside contexts and, increasingly, locally.

At the same time, the title has retained a connotation of command in the jihād (Arabic: جِهَاد, "holy war") and has been used thus throughout history, without necessarily implying a claim to the caliphate. It was used in this sense by the early Ottoman sultans—who notably rarely used the caliphal title after they took it from the Abbasids in 1517—as well as various West African Muslim warlords until the modern period. The title was used by Aurangzeb, the sixth emperor of the Mughal Empire. Muhammad Umar Khan of the Kokand Khanate took on the title.

Abdelkader El Djezairi assumed the title in 1834. The Afghan ruler Dost Mohammad Khan likewise used it when he proclaimed a jihād against the Sikh Empire in 1836. According to historian Richard Pennell, this pattern reflects the use of the term ʾAmīr al-Muʾminīn for regional rulers with the connotations of wide-ranging and absolute authority over a region, the power to conduct relations with foreign states, the upkeep of the Sharia, and the protection of Muslim territory from non-believers. Timur (Tamerlane) also used the title.

=== Modern usage ===
When Hussein bin Ali was buried in the compound of the Al-Aqsa Mosque as a caliph in 1931, the following inscription was written on the window above his tomb: Arabic: هَذَا قَبْرُ أَمِيرِ ٱلْمُؤْمِنِينَ ٱلْحُسَيْن بْنُ عَلِي, romanized: Haḏa qabru ʾamīri ʾal-mūˈminīna ʾal-Ḥusayn bnu ʿAlī, which translates to "This is the tomb of the Commander of the Faithful, Hussein bin Ali."

In 1996, the title was adopted by the Taliban leader Muhammad Umar. Mullah Mohammed Omar was conferred the title in April 1996 by a Taliban-convened shura (Arabic: شُورَىٰ, lit. 'assembly') of approximately 1000-1500 Afghan ulama in Kandahar, when he displayed the Cloak of Muhammad before the crowd. The title granted legitimacy to Omar's leadership of Afghanistan and his declared jihad against the government led by Burhanuddin Rabbani. Omar was still referred to as ʾAmīr al-Muʾminīn by his followers and other jihadists, notably al-Qaeda leader Ayman al-Zawahiri. Mullah Akhtar Mohammad Mansoor, the successor of Mullah Omar, was conferred the title in July 2015 upon his appointment as the new leader of the Taliban. Hibatullah Akhundzada, the third Supreme Leader of the Taliban, was also conferred the title upon his election in 2016 and became the Leader of Afghanistan in 2021.

In 2005, the Islamic State leader Abu Omar al-Baghdadi adopted the title, nine years before the Islamic State proclaimed its caliphate in 2014. Abu Umar al-Baghdadi was conferred the title after his appointment in October 2006 by the Mujahideen Shura Council as the first Emir of the newly declared Islamic State of Iraq. As Richard Pennell commented, by claiming the title they positioned themselves as potential "caliphs-in-waiting", but for the moment, the title was simply the expression of their claim to an overarching "activist authority" over the areas they controlled.

Abu Bakr al-Baghdadi, the successor of Abu Omar after his death in 2010, also adopted the title.

== Views ==
=== Twelver Shi'ism ===
Twelver Shias apply the title exclusively to Ali, the cousin and son-in-law of Muhammad, regarded as the first Imam by Shia Muslims and officially designated successor (caliph) to Muhammad.

=== Ismailism ===
The Isma'ili Fatimid caliphs used the title as part of their titulature, and in the Nizari branch of Isma'ilism, the ʾAmīr al-Muʾminīn is always the current Imam of the Time. In Nasir al-Din al-Tusi's The Voyage (Sayr wa-Suluk), he explains that the hearts of the believers are attached to the Commander of the Believers, not just the Command (Quran) itself. There is always a present living imam in the world, and following him, a believer could never go astray.

=== Zaydism ===
Among the Zaydis, the title retained strong connotations with the leadership of the jihād, and was thus the right of any rightful Imam who stepped forth to claim his right by force of arms. The title was thus part of the titulature of the Zaydi Imams of Yemen until the end of the Yemeni monarchy.

=== Ibadism ===
The Ibadis did not use the term, except for the Rustamid dynasty.

==== Non-Muslim usage ====
The Kitáb-i-Íqán, the primary theological work of the Baháʼí Faith, applies the title Commander of the Faithful to Ali, the son-in-law of Muhammad.

== See also ==
- Glossary of Islam
- Outline of Islam
- Dua
- Sabr
- Salawat al-Sha'baniyya
