= Salawat al-Sha'baniyya =

Supplication quoted from Imam al-Sajjad

Al-Ṣalawāt al-Shaʿbānīyya (Arabic: اَلصَّلَوات الشَّعبانِيَّة) is regarded as a supplication which was quoted from the fourth Imam of Shia Islam, Imam al-Sajjad. This Salawat is recommended to be recited every day in the month of Sha'ban as the eight month of the Islamic calendar. Meanwhile, it is better to recite it at noon and midnight. Shi'a Muslims usually recite it between Zuhr and 'Asr prayers. Its general message is related to the elucidation of Ahl al-Bayt position and likewise emphasis on their Wilaya.

== Sources ==
Shaykh Tusi narrated in Misbah al-Mutahajjid that Imam Sajjad used to recite it every day in the month of Sha'ban toward the sunset and likewise on the night of Shaban's half. This Salawat has been narrated through Shaykh Tusi in other books too, such as Eghbal al-A'maal and Jamal al-Osboo'. It is available in Mafatih al-Janan as well.

== Messages ==
In this Salawat, the position of Ahl al-Bayt and Imams (of Shia Islam) is considered as the most emphasized issue. The Phrase of Salawat is also repeated several times, it begs Allah to send Salawat (peace) upon the Islamic Prophet Muhammad and his family, and mentions that (the members of) Muhammad’s household are the treasure of science, the traffic place of angels, the place of divine mission and revelation, and several other significant messages.

== Some phrases of the Salawat ==
The following text is considered as the translation of the initial part of Salawat Sha'baniyya.

"O Allah: (please do) send blessings upon Muhammad and the Household of Muhammad— the tree of Prophethood; and the trustees of the (Divine) Mission; and the frequently visited by the angels; and the core of knowledge; and the Household of the Divine Revelation.

O Allah: (please do) send blessings upon Muhammad and the Family of Muhammad— the sailing ships through the abysmal waves. He who embarks on them will be saved, but he who abandons them will be drowned."

== See also ==
- Dua
- Sabr (Islamic term)
- Tasbih
- Dhikr
- Amir al-Mu'minin
- Salah
