= Ryda =

Ryda may refer to:

- Ryda (song), 2015 song by The Game
- Ryda Luke, Australian rules football player
- Ryda (district), district in Vara Municipality, Västra Götaland County, Sweden
- Ryda (nature reserve), nature reserve in Kinda Municipality, Östergötland County, Sweden
- Ryda (parish), in Vara Municipality, Västra Götaland County, Sweden
- Ryda (stream), in Russia
- Ryda, Sweden, urban area in Borås Municipality, Västra Götaland County, Sweden

== See also ==
- Rida (disambiguation)
