= Rida =

Rida may refer to:

- Rida (Islam), a concept in Islam
- Rida (name), an Arabic name
- Rida (river), a stream in Belgium
- 2-iminobutanoate/2-iminopropanoate deaminase, encoded by the RIDA gene

== See also ==
- Flo Rida
