= Sanabad (Mashhad) =

Ancient village

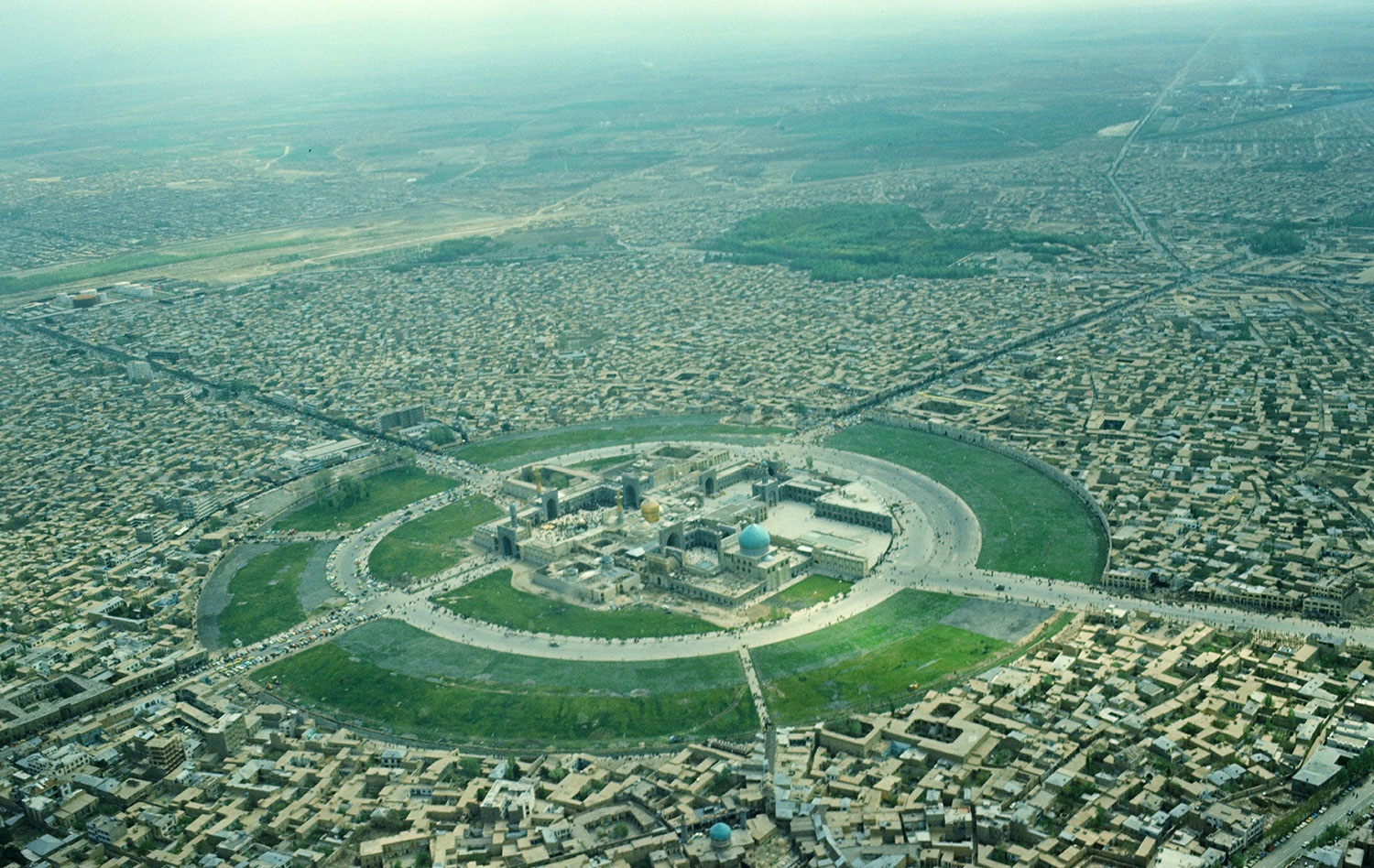
Aerial view of al-Rida shrine and location of the of Humayd ibn Qahtaba garden and the tomb of Harun al-Rashid, 1976

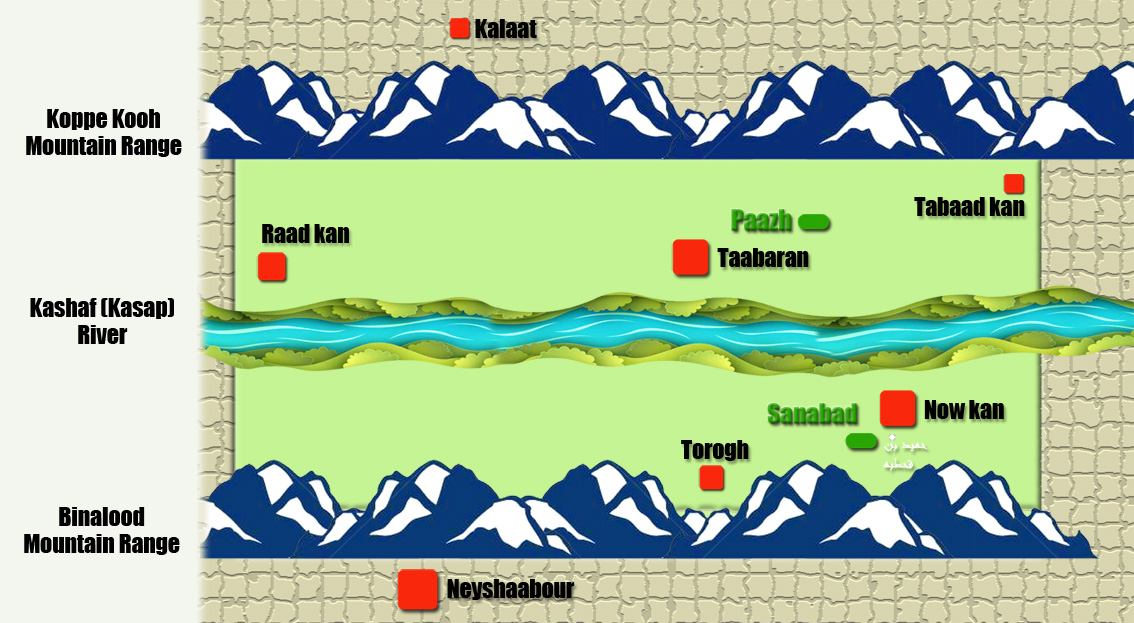
Location of Sanabad in Toos (ancient Susia) District region

Sanabad was a village where the palace of Humayd ibn Qahtaba was located in the early 3rd century AH. When Harun al-Rashid died, he was buried in this palace. A few years later, during the caliphate of al-Ma'mun, in 202 AH, Ali al-Rida, who was on his way to Baghdad was poisoned in the house of the emir of Sanabad, and al-Ma'mun buried his body near Harun's grave. From then on, that spot was called "Mashhad al-Rida", or Mashhad (place of martyrdom) for short. The city developed around the grave of al-Rida as the holiest site in Iran for the Shia. Gradually, many pilgrims were attracted to this place, and their number increased year by year.
