= Mohammad Rezaei =

Mohammad Rezaei may refer to:

- Mohammad Rezaei (wrestler, born 1958), Iranian wrestler who won bronze medal at the 1978 World Wrestling Championships
- Mohammad Rezaei (wrestler, born 1978), Iranian wrestler who won bronze medal at the 2002 Asian Games
