= Rida (Islam) =

Concept in Islam

In Islam, rida (Arabic: رِضَا, riḍā, literally 'approval') is interpreted as satisfaction or "perfect contentment with God's will or decree".

Riḍā is often found rather vaguely within the English translation of the Qur'an, and in the life accounts of Sufi saints such as Rābiʻa al-ʻAdawiyya al-Qaysiyya (Rabia al-Adawiyya). According to Annemarie Schimmel, author of Mystical Dimensions of Islam, "riḍā is closely related to shukr, or gratitude", another virtue within Islam. Other possible related virtues would be sabr, faqr, tawakkul, and zuhd; all coalescing to form "perfect sincerity" or ikhlas.

== Within the Qur'an ==
The following are some examples of possible interpretations of riḍā within the Qur'an:

- "(All) people are a single nation; so Allah raised prophets as bearers of good news and as warners, and He revealed with them the Book with truth, that it might judge between people in that in which they differed; and none but the very people who were given it differed about it after clear arguments had come to them, revolting among themselves; so Allah has guided by His will those who believe to the truth about which they differed and Allah guides whom He pleases to the right path." (2:213)
- "Thus it is due to mercy from Allah that you deal with them gently, and had you been rough, hard hearted, they would certainly have dispersed from around you; pardon them therefore and ask pardon for them, and take counsel with them in the affair; so when you have decided, then place your trust in Allah; surely Allah loves those who trust." (3:159)
- "And if they were content with what Allah and His Apostle gave them, and had said: Allah is sufficient for us; Allah will soon give us (more) out of His grace and His Apostle too; surely to Allah do we make our petition." (9:59)
- "Indeed we shall have forged a lie against Allah If we go back to your religion after Allah has delivered us from It, and it befits us not that we should go back to it, except if Allah our Lord please: Our Lord comprehends all things :n His knowledge; in Allah do we trust: Our Lord! decide between us and our people with truth; and Thou art the best of deciders." (7:89)
- "There is no harm in the Prophet doing that which Allah has ordained for him; such has been the course of Allah with respect to those who have gone before; and the command of Allah is a decree that is made absolute." (33:38)
- "He it is Who gives life and brings death, so when He decrees an affair, He only says to it: Be, and it is." (40:68)
- "And give him sustenance from whence he thinks not; and whoever trusts in Allah, He is sufficient for him; surely Allah attains His purpose; Allah indeed has appointed a measure for everything." (65:3)

== Rabi'a ==
The following are a couple examples of riḍā within the life of Rabi'a, a female Sufi saint:

When Rabi'a grew older, her mother and father died. A great famine occurred in Basra. The sisters were separated, and Rabi'a fell into the hands of a wicked man who sold her for a few dirhams. That master ordered her to work long and hard.

One day on the street, she fled from the indignity. She fell and broke her hand. She put her face on the ground and said,'I am a stranger without mother or father. I am captive and my hand is broken. None of this saddens me. All I need is for you to be pleased with me, to know whether you are pleased with me or not.'

She heard a voice say, 'Do not be sad. Tomorrow a grandeur will be yours such that the closest of the heavenly company will take pride in you.'

They asked, 'When is a servant of God contented?' She said, 'When he is as thankful for tribulation as he is for bliss.' They asked, 'When a sinner repents, does He accept him or not?' She said, 'How can he repent, unless the Lord gives him repentance and accepts him? Until He gives him repentance, he cannot repent.'
