= De facto Government of South Ossetia =

The Government of the Republic of South Ossetia is the political leadership of the partially recognised Republic of South Ossetia.

== Executive branch ==
South Ossetia's head of state is the president. The current president is Marat Kambolov. The head of government is the prime minister, who is supported by a cabinet of ministers. The current prime minister is Soslan Margiev.

In August, 2009, then-president Eduard Kokoity dismissed Aslanbek Bulatsev's cabinet. It was said that Bulatsev had long been sick and had repeatedly sought to resign. All ministers kept their posts for some time and work with new PM Vadim Brovtsev, though some were replaced after a while.

== Current cabinet ==
The current government was formed in October 2026 following the appointment of Soslan Margiev as Prime Minister.

Office	Incumbent
Prime Minister	Soslan Margiev
First Deputy Prime Minister	Ekaterina Tolstikova
Deputy Prime Minister	Dmitry Gladsky
Deputy Prime Minister	Atsamaz Kabisov
Minister of Foreign Affairs	Akhsar Dzhioev
Minister of Defence	Yuri Yarovitsky
Minister of Internal Affairs	Radion Gabaraev
Minister of Civil Defense, Emergencies and Disaster Management	Vladimir Pukhaev
Minister of Justice	Alan Dzhioev
Minister of Economic Development and Entrepreneurship Support	Nikolai Airapetyan
Minister of Finance	Inna Dzudtsova
Minister of Agriculture and Food	Erislav Zasseev
Minister of Construction, Architecture, Housing and Utilities	Zaur Chochiev
Minister of Culture	Grigory Mamiev (acting)
Minister of Education and Science	Aslan Lolaev
Minister of Health	Soslan Naniev
Minister of Labor and Social Protection	Oleg Gagloev

== Cabinet 2014-2017 ==
Office	Incumbent
Prime Minister	Domenti Sardionovich Kulumbegov
Deputy Prime Minister	Alan Zaurovich Tekhov
Deputy Prime Minister	Erik Georgiyevich Pukhayev
Head of the Presidential Administration	Boris Eliozovich Chochiev
Minister of Foreign Affairs	David Georgievich Sanakoev
Minister of Defence	Valeriy Adamovich Yakhnovets
Minister of Internal Affairs	Akhsar Endrikovich Lavoyev
Minister of Justice	Zalina Yuryevna Laliyeva
Minister for Civil Defense, Emergencies and Disaster Management	Sergey Soslanovich Sanakoev
Minister of Finance	Aza Konstantinovna Habalova
Minister of Economic Development	Vil'yam Yur'yevich Dzagoyev
Minister of Education and Science	Marina Lyudvigovna Chibirova
Minister of Culture	Madina Arkhipovna Ostayeva
Minister of Health and Social Development	Grigory Stepanovich Kulidzhanov
Minister of Agriculture	Mairbeg Vladimirovich Guchmazov
Minister of Construction, Architecture, Housing and Utilities	Eduard Nikolayevich Dzagoev

=== Abolished Ministries ===
On August 24, 2009, several ministries were abolished. The following ministries were merged into the new Ministry of Youth, Education and Science, led by Anatoly Kusraev:

Office	Last incumbent
Minister of Youth, Sport and Tourism (also deputy PM)	Eleonora Hristoforovna Bedoeva
Minister of Education and Science	Anatoly Georgievich Kusraev

The following ministries were abolished. Their tasks were taken over by the Ministry of Economic Development:

Office	Last incumbent
Deputy Prime Minister and Minister of Industry and Trade	Taimuraz Arahmatovich Chochiev
Minister of Transport and Road Management	Alan Hadzhimurzaevich Koliev
Minister of Communications and Information	Georgij Sergeevich Kabisov
Minister of state property and land relations	Sergei Vladimirovich Parastaev
Minister of Natural Resources and Ecology	Vitaly Grigorievich Dzeranov
Minister of Agriculture and Food	Dzhambolat Iosivovich Kozaev
Minister of Press and Mass Communications	Irina Yureva Gagloeva

=== Ministers of Justice ===
Name of Minister	Years of service
Anatoly Illarionovich Khugaev	First minister
Alan Ivanovich Parastaev	c. 2001
Alan Rostomovich Dzhikayez	c. 2002–2003
Merab Illyich Chigoyev	c. 2004–2008
Atsamaz Ivanovich Bichenov	c. 2008–2010
Tamazi Sikoyevich Doguzov	c. 2010–2012
Murat Vaneev	c. 2012
Alan Nikolayevich Dzhioyev	c. 2014–2015
Marina Bestaeva	c. 2015–2017
Zalina Yuryevna Laliyeva	c. 2017-22

== Legislative branch ==
The Parliament of South Ossetia is the parliament of the Republic of South Ossetia.

== See also ==
- Government of Georgia (country)
- Politics of South Ossetia
- Politics of Georgia (country)
