= Syed Shahed Reza =

Ambassador of Bangladesh to Kuwait
- In office August 2009 – July 2013
- Preceded by: A. I. M. Mostofa Reza Nur
- Succeeded by: Ashab Uddin

Syed Shahed Reza is the general secretary of the Bangladesh Olympic Association and former ambassador of Bangladesh to Kuwait and Yemen. He is a former president of Dhaka Club.

== Early life ==
Reza was born on 1 January 1952. He has a bachelor's in political science and a master's in public administration from the University of Dhaka. His father in law, Syed Haider Ali, was a member of the first parliament of Bangladesh from the Awami League.

== Career ==
Reza worked for Parsons Corporation in Saudi Arabia working at the Saudi Government Royal Commission for Yanbu Project.

Reza joined the Ministry of Foreign Affairs on 9 June 2009 with the rank of secretary; a part of a series of contractual appointments to top posts by the recently elected Awami League government. Reza was appointed ambassador of Bangladesh to Kuwait in August 2009 for a three-year term. He succeeded Major General A. I. M. Mostofa Reza Nur. He presented his credentials to the Emir of Kuwait Sabah Al-Ahmad Al-Jaber Al-Sabah in October. He worked to issue machine readable passports to the Bangladeshi expat community in Kuwait.

Reza's appointment as the ambassador of Bangladesh to Kuwait was extended for one more year in 2012. He was succeeded by Major General Ashab Uddin. He had been in the executive committee of the Bangladesh Olympic Association for 11 years before he was elected general secretary of it in 2012 unopposed. He was awarded the National Sports Awards in 2014.

In December 2015, Reza was elected president of Dhaka Club Limited defeating Khandkar Mashiuz Zaman Romel.

In 2021, Reza sponsored Muhammad Yunus, Nobel laurate and founder of Grameen Bank, for an Olympic laurel. In December, he was re-elected secretary general of Bangladesh Olympic Association for a third time. While Chief of Bangladesh Army, General SM Shafiuddin Ahmed, was elected president of the association.

Reza is a director of The ACME Laboratories Ltd. He is a member of the International Relations Committee of the Olympic Council of Asia. Bangladesh High Court appointed him to Envoy Textiles Limited, a subsidiary of Envoy Group, as an independent director. He is the managing director of SMP Trading Co.

In 2023, Reza invited Husain Al-Musallam, president of World Aquatics, to visit Bangladesh which he did in March.
