= Hajar Khatoon Mosque =

Mosque and Shrine of Bibi Khatun

- مسجد هاجرخاتون
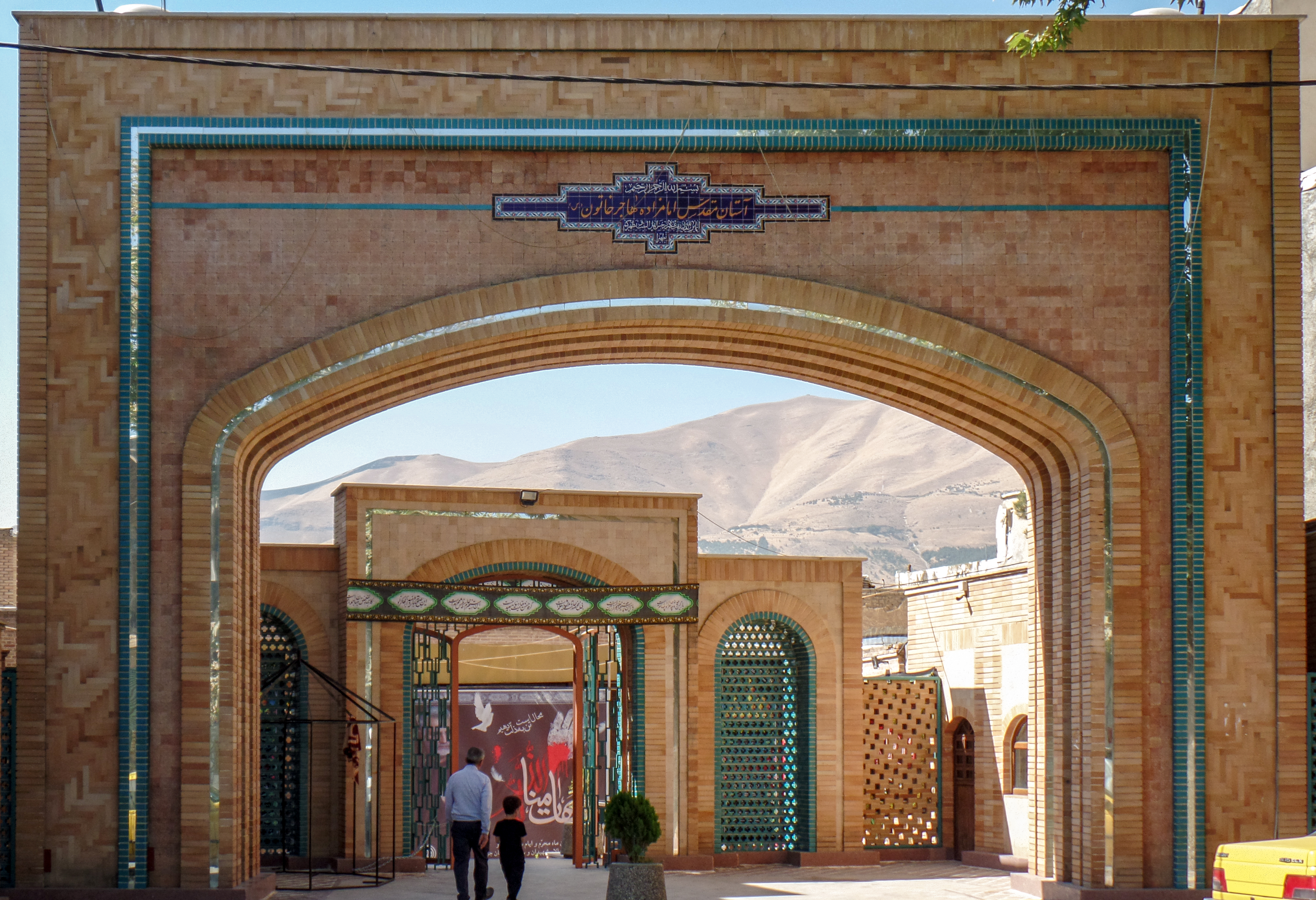
- A portal to the mosque and shrine, in 2020

- Location of the mosque and shrine in Iran

Religion
- Affiliation: Sunni Islam
- Ecclesiastical or organizational status: Mosque and shrine
- Status: Active

Location
- Location: Sanandaj, Kurdistan
- Country: Iran
- Interactive map of Hajar Khatoon Mosque
- Coordinates: 35°19′11″N 47°00′00″E

Architecture
- Type: Mosque architecture
- Founder: Haj Sheikh Shokrollah
- Shrine: One

Iran National Heritage List
- Official name: Hajar Khatoon Mosque
- Type: Built
- Reference no.: 2770
- Conservation organization: Cultural Heritage, Handicrafts and Tourism Organization of Iran

The Hajar Khatoon Mosque (Sorani Kurdish: مزگەوتی ھاجەرخاتوون, Persian: مسجد هاجرخاتون) is a Sunni mosque and shrine, located in the city of Sanandaj, in the province of Kurdistan, in western Iran.

The shrine contains the tomb of Hajar Khatoon, who was the sibling of Ali al-Rida.

The mosque was added to the Iran National Heritage List, administered by the Cultural Heritage, Handicrafts and Tourism Organization of Iran.

== Gallery ==
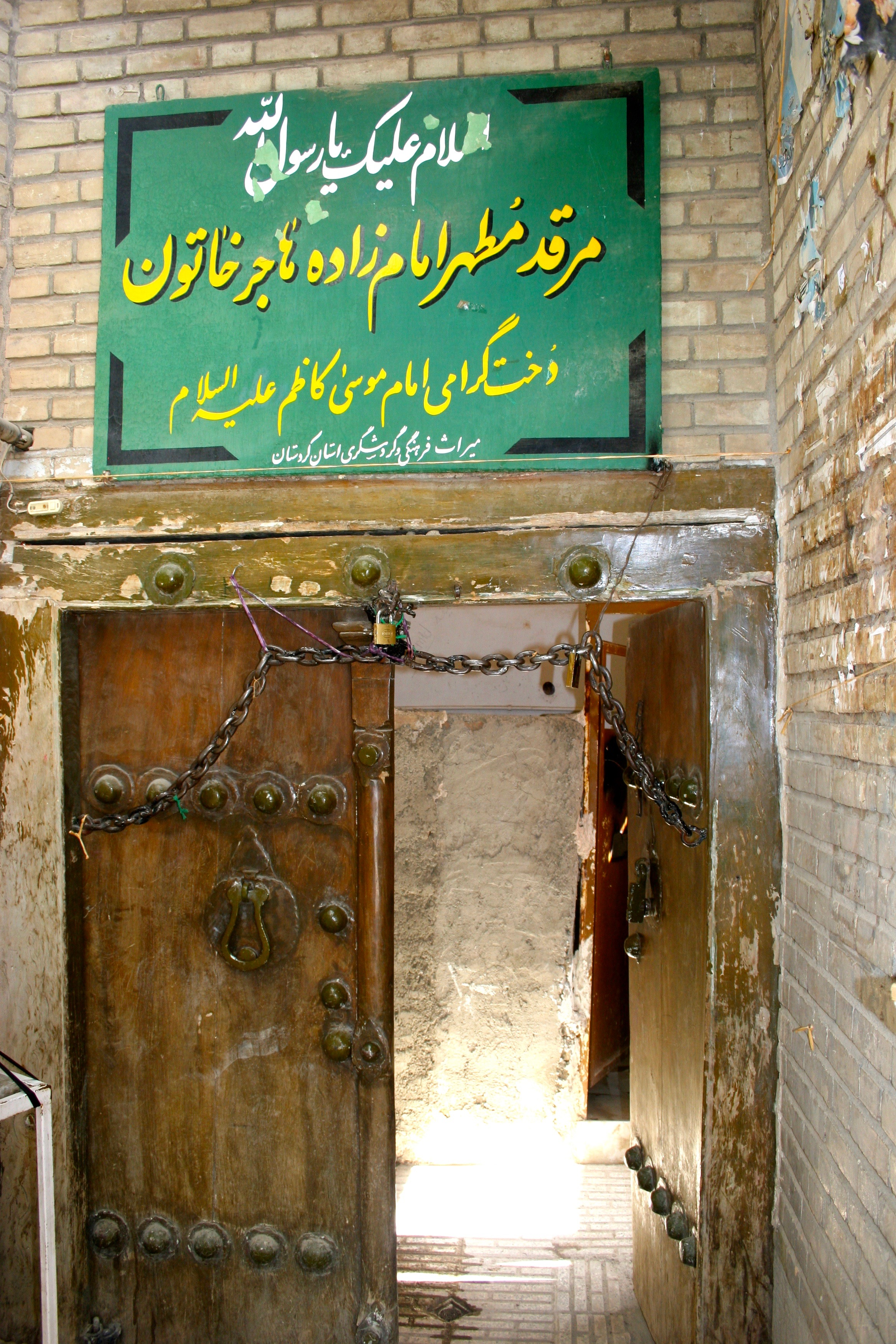

== See also ==
- Islam in Iran
- List of mosques in Iran
