= Ressa =

Ressa may refer to the following notable people:

Given name

- Ressa Kania Dewi (born 1994), Indonesian swimmer

Surname

- Maria Ressa (born 1963), Filipino-American journalist and a Nobel Peace laureate

== See also ==
- Resa (disambiguation)
