= Redha Hamiani =

Algerian politician (1944–2021)

Redha Hamiani (4 May 1944 – 27 March 2021) was the Algerian minister for small business in the 1995 government of Mokdad Sifi.
