= A. I. M. Mostofa Reza Nur =

Retired Lieutenant General of Bangladesh Army

- আমিনুল ইসলাম মোহাম্মদ মোস্তফা রেজা নূর

Principal Staff Officer of Armed Forces Division
- In office 12 April 2004 – 8 June 2006
- President: Iajuddin Ahmed
- Prime Minister: Khaleda Zia
- Preceded by: Mohammad Shubid Ali Bhuiyan
- Succeeded by: Jahangir Alam Chowdhury

Ambassador of Bangladesh to Kuwait
- In office August 2006 – April 2008
- Preceded by: Nazrul Islam Khan
- Succeeded by: Syed Shahed Reza

Military service
- Allegiance: Bangladesh
- Branch/service: Bangladesh Army
- Years of service: 1975–2008
- Rank: Lieutenant General
- Unit: Corps of Engineers
- Commands: Principal Staff Officer of Armed Forces Division; MGO of Army Headquarters; Commandant of DSCSC

Aminul Islam Mohammad Mostofa Reza Nur is a former lieutenant general of the Bangladesh Army and former principal staff officer, head of the Armed Forces Division.

== Career ==
Nur was commissioned in the Bangladesh Army on 11 January 1975.

From 2004 to 2006, he served as the principal staff officer, head of the Armed Forces Division. On 6 April 2006, he was appointed the ambassador of Bangladesh to Kuwait. He served as the ambassador till 3 June 2008.

Nur is a member of Baridhara DOHS Parishad. He participated in the Prime Bank Cup Golf Tournament in 2015 and won the hole-in-one competition.
