= Rezaul Karim =

Rezaul Karim (Bengali: রেজাউল করিম, Arabic: رضا الكريم) is a Bengali masculine given name of Arabic origin. It may refer to:

- Rezaul Karim (lawyer) (born 1902), Bengali lawyer and independence activist
- Rezaul Karim (diplomat) (1935–2005), Bangladeshi diplomat
- Rezaul Karim Hira (born 1942), Bangladesh Awami League politician
- A. K. M. Rezaul Karim Tansen (born 1953), Bangladeshi politician
- Rezaul Karim Chowdhury (born 1953), Bangladeshi politician and mayor of Chittagong
- A. F. M. Rezaul Karim Siddique (1955–2016), Bangladeshi professor
- Rezaul Karim Bablu (born 1962), Bangladeshi politician
- SM Rezaul Karim (born 1962), Bangladeshi minister
- Rezaul Karim Rehan (born 1968), Bangladeshi footballer
- Syed Rezaul Karim (born 1971), Bangladeshi Islamic scholar and politician
- Rezaul Karim Liton (born 1980), Bangladeshi footballer
- Rezaul Karim Reza (born 1987), Bangladeshi footballer
- Rezaul Karim Mannan, Bangladeshi politician
- Rejaul Karim Laskar, Indian politician
- Md. Rezaul Karim, Bangaldeshi urban planner
