= Resa =

Resa may refer to:

== People ==
- Alexander J. Resa (1887–1964), American politician
- Neithard Resa (born 1950), German violist
- Nikolaus Resa (born 1980), German pianist
- Rick Resa, American Paralympic athlete

== Places ==
- Duga Resa, Croatia
- Resa, Semič, Slovenia

== Other uses ==
- Runway safety area
- Newaygo County Regional Educational Service Agency
- Wayne County Regional Educational Service Agency
