= Ridha Jlassi =

Tunisian football supporter

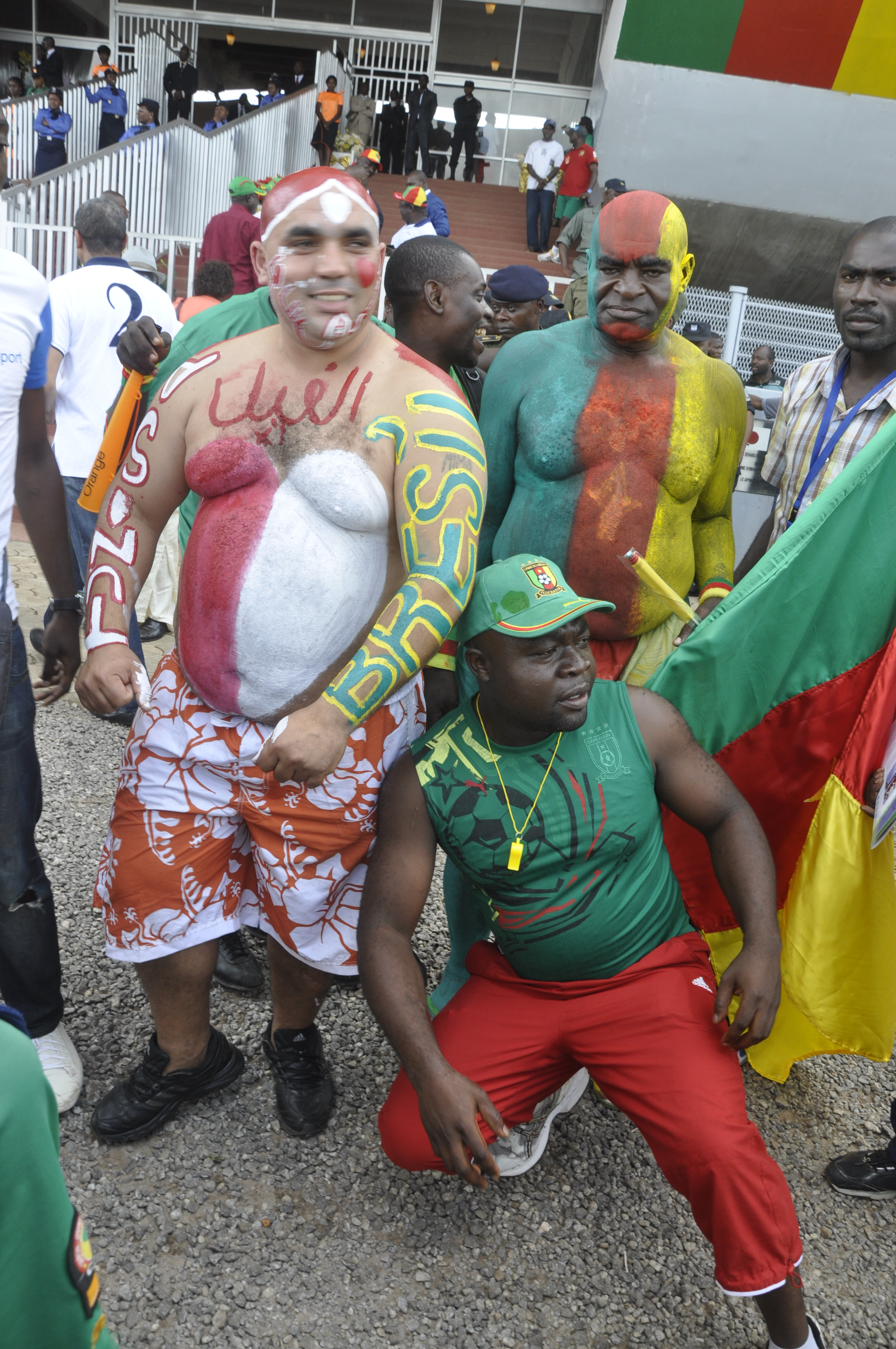
- Ridha Jlassi at the 2013 Africa Cup of Nations.
- Born: 26 December 1979 (age 45); Nabeul, Tunisia
- Other names: Ridha the elephant
- Known for: Official Tunisia national football team supporter

Ridha Jlassi (Arabic: رضا الجلاصي; born 26 December 1979) or Ridha the elephant (Arabic: رضا الفيل), is a Tunisian football supporter and he is the official Tunisia national football team supporter. Ridha's first appearance was at the 2006 FIFA World Cup. He was chosen as the best 2018 FIFA World Cup fan.
