= Harun al-Rashid Mausoleum =

Ancient mausoleum in Mashhad, Iran

- آرامگاه هارون الرشيد
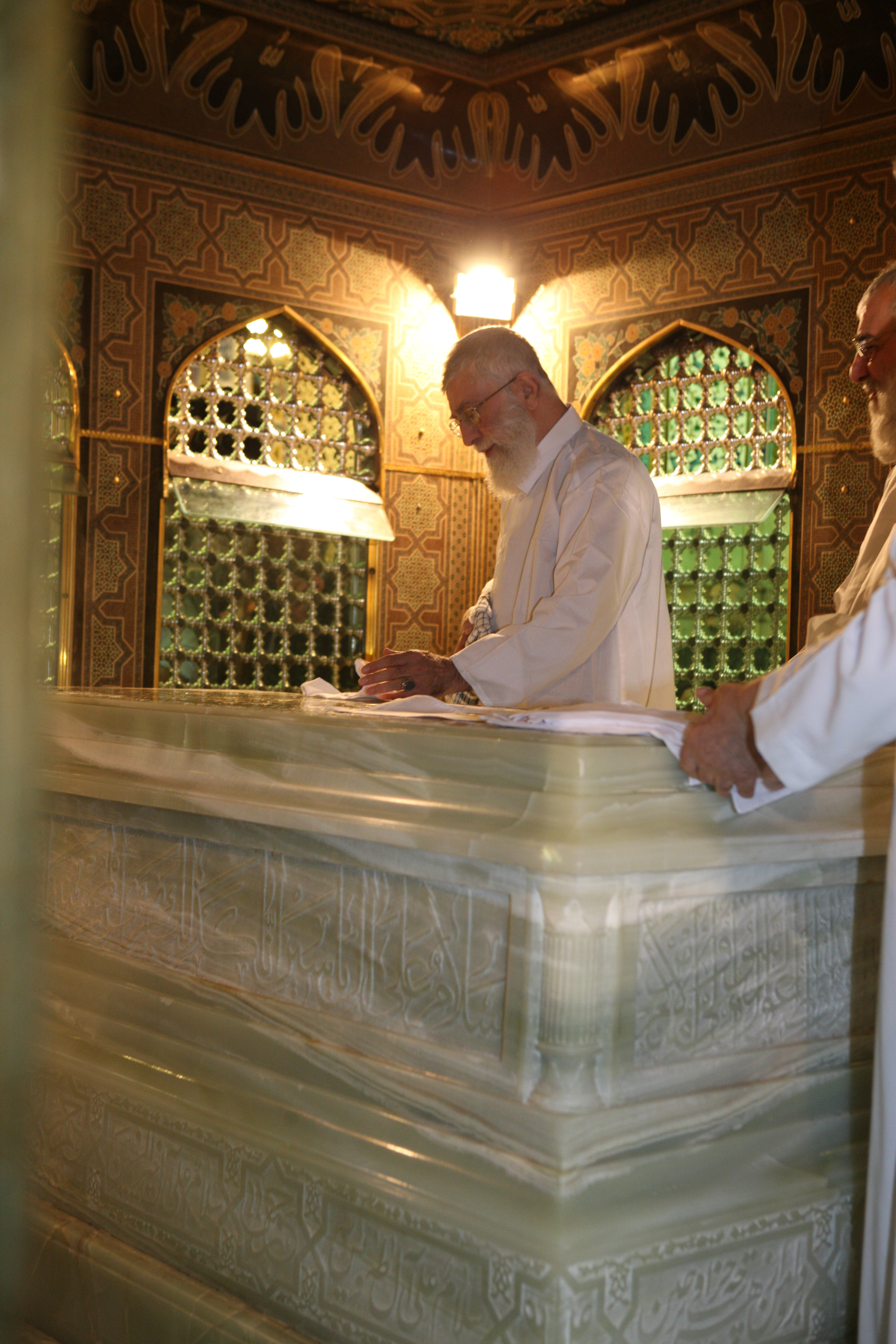
- The interior of the mausoleum containing the tomb of Ali al-Ridha

- Location of the mausoleum in Iran

Religion
- Affiliation: Shia Islam
- Ecclesiastical or organisational status: Mausoleum
- Status: Active

Location
- Location: Imam Reza shrine, Mashhad, Razavi Khorasan province
- Country: Iran
- Interactive map of Harun al-Rashid Mausoleum
- Coordinates: 36°17′17″N 59°36′57″E

Architecture
- Type: Islamic architecture
- Style: Abbasid; Safavid
- Completed: 193 AH (808/809 CE)
- Shrines: Two: Harun al-Rashid (AH 193); Ali al-Rida (AH 202)

The Harun al-Rashid Mausoleum (Persian: آرامگاه هارون الرشيد) is a Shi'ite Islamic mausoleum located in the city of Mashhad, in the province of Razavi Khorasan, Iran. The structure contains the tombs of both the Abbasid caliph Harun al-Rashid and Ali al-Ridha, the 8th imam.

The mausoleum is contained within the Imam Reza shrine, a complex that was added to the Iran National Heritage List on 6 January 1932, administered by the Cultural Heritage, Handicrafts and Tourism Organization of Iran, and, on 2 February 2017, was added to the tentative list of UNESCO World Heritage Sites.

== Harun al-Rashid ==
Abu Ja'far Harun ibn Muhammad al-Mahdi ibn Abdallah al-Mansur, the fifth Abbasid Caliph, was born in the city of Rayy in 149 AH (766/767 CE) and died in the city of Tus (Mashhad today) in 193 AH (808/809 CE).

Al-Rashid, despite all his great deeds, felt the lack of resourcefulness in face of competitions and agendas within his Empire; the Barmakids catastrophe was not a solution to the situation. At the end of his days, he became lonely and ill. Hiding his illness from people, he uncovered his belly to one of his friends, displaying a band of silk on it. Al-Rashid said to his friend: “This is an injury that I kept from all people. All including my sons are waiting for my death”. Al-Rashid's illness got worse on his way to Khorasan to end the revolt of Rafi' ibn al-Layth. He died in the city of Tus (the current city of Mashhad in northeastern Iran) and was buried there in Jumada II in 193 AH (808/809 CE).

== Ali al-Rida ==
Ali al-Rida was entombed following his death in 202 AH (817/818 CE). al-Rida was buried in Tus next to Harun al-Rashid. Tus was later replaced with the new city of Mashhad (lit. 'place of martyrdom'), developed around the grave of al-Rida as the holiest site in Iran for the Shia. The present shrine dates to the 14th century, when the Il-khan Öljaitü converted to Twelver Shi'ism. Most of the elaborate decorative work in the present imposing complex dates from Safavid and Qajar eras. Adjacent to the shrine is the Goharshad Mosque, one of the finest in Iran, named after the wife of the Timurid emperor Shah Rukh and completed in 1394. Several theological colleges have been built around the shrine, the most famous of which is that of Mirza Ja'far Khan.

== Shrine location ==
The shrine is located within the Imam Reza shrine complex in the center of the city of Mashhad. The complex is surrounded by a roundabout branching to all parts of the city of Mashhad, and is bordered on the north by Noghan, from the south by Imam Reza Street and Bayt al-Maqdis Roundabout, and from the southwest by Nawab Safavi Street From the northeast, Ayatollah Shirazi Street.

The traveler Ibn Battuta described the shrine by saying: The honored scene has a great dome inside a corner adjacent to a school and a mosque, all of which are well built. In front of this is the tomb of Harun al-Rashid, and on it is a bench on which they place the candlesticks.

== See also ==
- List of mausoleums in Iran
- Holiest sites in Shia Islam
- Islam in Iran
