= Aza Rakhmanova =

Russian AIDS and Hepatitis expert

- Born: Azerbaijani: Aza Rəhmanova; 17 September 1932; Baku, Azerbaijani SSR, Soviet Union
- Died: 18 November 2015 (aged 83); Saint Petersburg, Russian Federation
- Occupation: Professor
- Known for: treating HIV/AIDS in Russia / expert Professor

Aza Rakhmanova or Aza Gasanovna Rakhmanova (Azerbaijani: Aza Həsən qızı Rəhmanova, Russian: Аза Гасановна Рахманова; 17 September 1932 – 18 November 2015) was a Russian AIDS and Hepatitis expert of Azerbaijani descent. She was credited with organizing AIDS prevention and control in St. Petersburg and served as Head of the Department of Infectious Diseases at the Saint Petersburg Medical Academy of Postgraduate Studies.

== Life ==
Aza Rakhmanova was born in Baku in 1932 into an intelligentsia family. Her father was Hasan Pasha Rakhmanov and her mother Dr. Khavve-Hanoum Rakhmanova taught medicine in Semipalatinsk. Her father was arrested and subjected to political repression in 1937 and died in prison three years later. Her paternal uncles, including Huseyn, who served as Chairman of the Council of People's Commissars of the Azerbaijan SSSR, were also repressed. In 1941, her family was exiled to the Sintash mine in Altai krai, Kazakhstan. In Semipalatinsk, Kazakhstan, Rakhmanova received a good education because Moscow professors had also been exiled to the same region.

From 1949 to 1955, Rakhmanova was a student in the Faculty of General Medicine at the I.P. Pavlov State Medical University in St. Petersburg, graduating with honours in 1955. Having received permission to return to Baku in 1959, she worked as an infectious diseases specialist at facilities in Baku, and at the Azerbaijan State Institute for Advanced Training of Physicians. She defended her candidate's dissertation at the Azerbaijan State Institute for Advanced Training of Physicians on the topic, "Anticteric and abortive forms of Botkin's disease" in 1964. On Rakhmanova's initiative, intensive care units were established - for the first time in the USSR - at the S.P. Botkin Clinical Infectious Diseases Hospital, and a system for the staged treatment of patients with chronic hepatitis was created.

Rakhmanova returned to St. Petersburg in 1965, working at the Pavlov State Medical University. She began as a senior laboratory assistant, but worked her way through the ranks and in 1972, after defending her dissertation, was made a Professor of Infectious Diseases. In 1984, Rakhmanova was appointed Chief Infectious Disease Specialist for the Saint Petersburg Health Committee, spearheading a new scientific direction focused on studying the developmental factors of prevalent slow-progressing infections and serious epidemic diseases. In 1986, following a competitive selection process, she was appointed Head of the Department of Infectious Diseases at the Leningrad Medical Academy of Postgraduate Studies. She later served as professor at the Department of Socially-Significant Infections at Pavlov State Medical University.

== AIDS Prevention Work ==
In the late 1980s, the first AIDS cases began to appear in the Soviet Union. Rakhmanova became a driving force behind the establishment of an AIDS Clinical Center at the Botkin Clinical Infectious Diseases Hospital in 1987, and later became Deputy Head of the St. Petersburg City AIDS Center. The Saint Petersburg Medical Academy of Postgraduate Studies, which she headed until 2001, became the country's leading center for the study of HIV in and viral hepatitis, and a course on the laboratory diagnosis of AIDS was established within the Department of Infectious Diseases on her initiative. She also campaigned for the rights of homosexuals, advocating for the removal of Article 121, which criminalized homosexuality.

Rakhmanova also participated in the establishment of AIDS centres elsewhere: in 1991, she helped create the Russian Clinical Center for HIV Infection and AIDS in the settlement of Ust-Izhora in the Russian Federation, and in 1999 she participated in the opening of the Scientific-Practical Center for pregnant women and children affected by HIV infection. Rakhmanova was an advocate for sex education, and served as editor-in-chief of the journal AIDS. Sex. Health [СПИД. Секс. Здоровье], which was one of the few publications dedicated to HIV/AIDS when it was first published in 1991. She also served as editor-in-chief of the academic journal, 'HIV Infection and Immunosuppression [ВИЧ-инфекция и иммуносупрессии].

After the collapse of the Soviet Union, Saint Petersburg became a leader in dealing with AIDS, with Rakhmanova serving as an adviser to the Mayor Anatoly Sobchak as well as working at Russian hospitals dealing with thousands of cases of AIDS. She participated in more than 20 international projects, partnering with international NGOs and governments to prevent HIV/AIDS and other infections. She was awarded a diploma from UNICEF for her contributions to the prevention and treatment of HIV among pregnant women and children.

== Publications ==
Aza wrote eleven books in addition to co-authoring five textbooks, almost 50 methodological manuals. She published around 350 journal articles in her lifetime.

== Personal Life ==
Aza Rakhmanova had one daughter from her first marriage to Nikolai Vinogradov, a paediatrician. She took her husband's name as a means of self-preservation after her father was labelled an "enemy of the people"; after her divorce she reverted to her maiden name. Her second husband was Yevgeny Borisov, a native of Baku and a Captain 1st Rank who served in the Caspian Flotilla of the USSR Navy. She had one child with Vinogradov: Elena Nikolaevna Vinogradova (1955-2007), a Doctor of Medical Sciences, professor, and the founder and head of the St. Petersburg Center for the Prevention and Control of AIDS and Infectious Diseases.

Aza Rakhmanova died in Saint Petersburg on 18 November 2015. A farewell ceremony was held at the Department of Pathological Anatomy at the S.P. Botkin Clinical Infectious Diseases Hospital. She is buried in Bolsheohtinskoe cemetery. In 2016 a memorial plaque was unveiled at the St. Petersburg AIDS Center.
