= Reza Samani =

Iranian musician (born 1977)

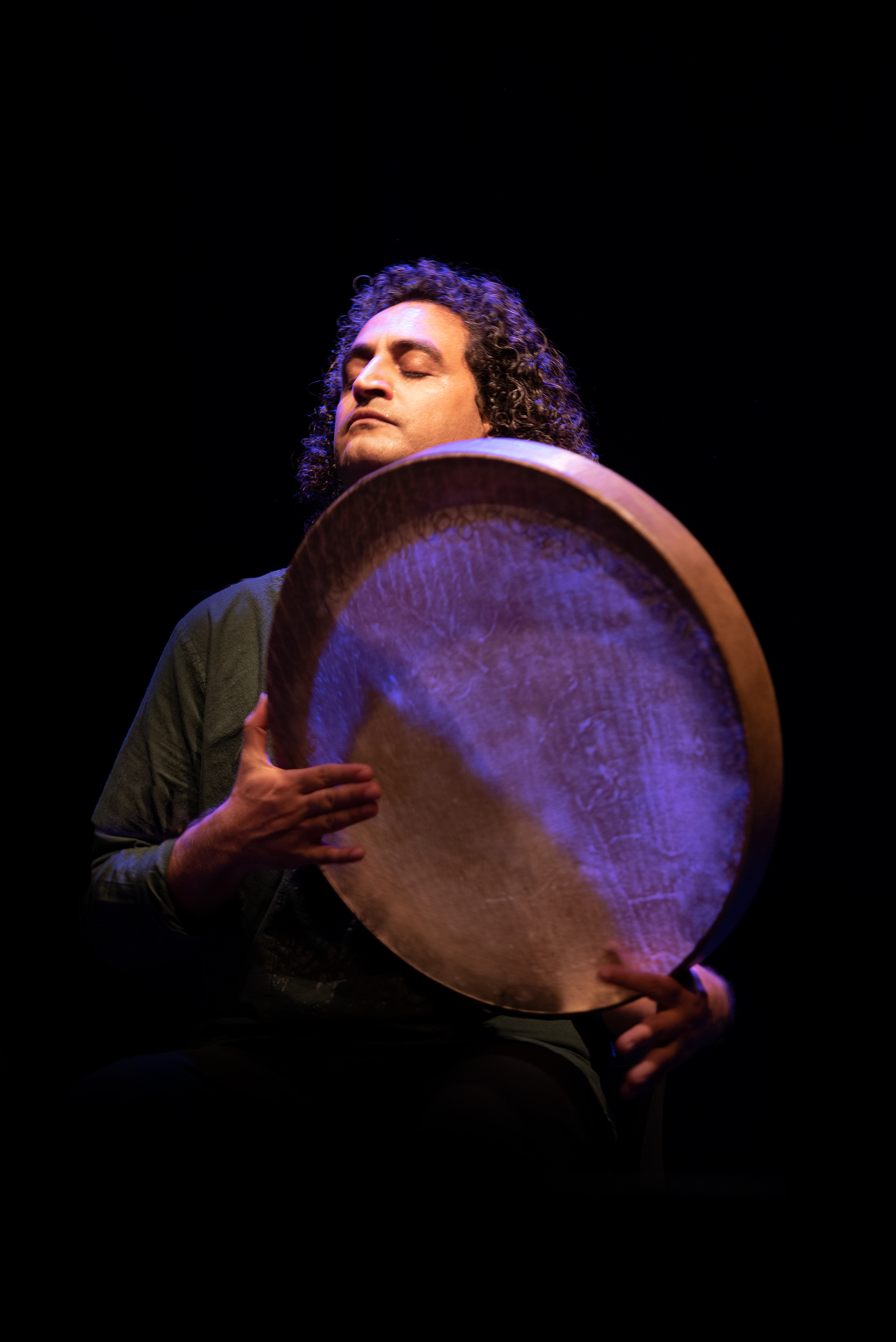
Reza Samani playing Daf

Reza Samani (born 1977) is an Iranian musician.

== Biography ==
Samani was born in Chahar Mahal, Bakhtiari, Iran.

Samani immigrated to Germany in 1999.

He has been a member of the Ensemble Samani since 1999 and Ensemble Zarbang since 2001.

== Discography ==
- Call to Love. Hermes Records, 2008.
- Naghme-ye khabgard. Kârgâh-e Musiqi, 2006.
- Persian and Middle Eastern Percussion. ARC-Music, 2005
- Rengineh. 2003.
- Daf Duo: Samani. 2001.
