= Aza Habalova =

South Ossetian politician

Aza Konstantinovna Habalova (Russian: Аза Константиновна Хабалова) (born April 13, 1958) is a South Ossetian politician. She formerly held the post of Minister of Finance in the Government of South Ossetia.

Habalova is a native of Tskhinvali. She graduated from Faculty of Economics at Moscow State University in 1981 with a degree in economics. Beginning in 1995 she taught at South Ossetian State University. During her career she has held positions with various branches of the South Ossetian government, including as chief accountant of the Ministry of National Resources and chairing the Committee on Interaction with International Organizations and the Committee on Economics. She was appointed to the post of Minister of Finance on May 19, 2012, in a decree signed by President of South Ossetia Leonid Tibilov. She succeeded Irina Sytnik in the post. Habalova had previously served as Minister of Finance from 1999 until 2008; she was reappointed to the post once again in 2017 by President Anatoly Bibilov. She is married with two children.
