= Ali al-Rida =

Eighth of the Twelve Shia Imams (766–818)

Ali al-Rida علي الرضا Eighth Imam of Twelver Shi'ism
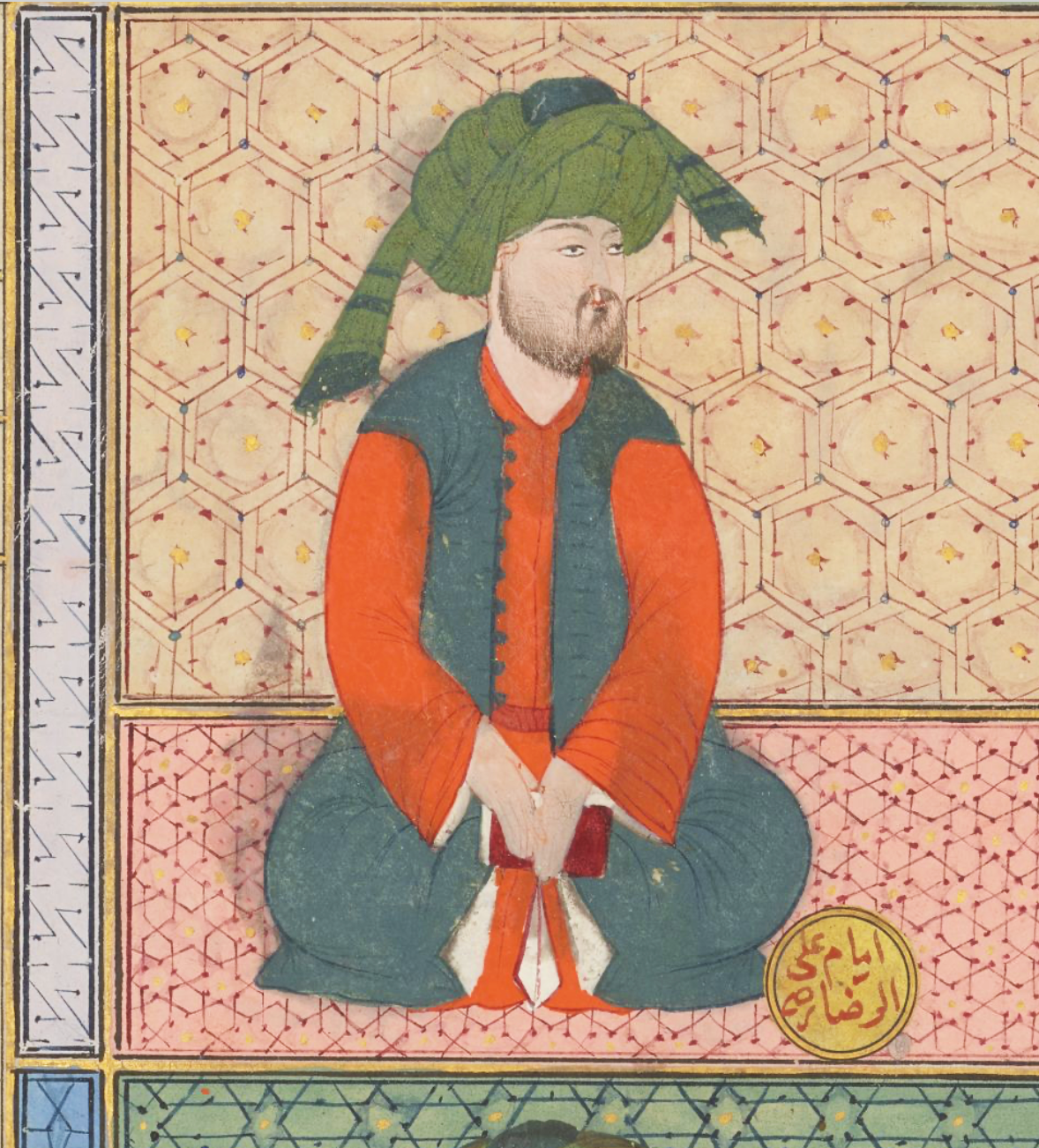
- 16th‑century Ottoman iconographic depiction of Ali al-Rida

8th Shia Imam
- In office 148 AH (765/766 CE) – 203 AH (818/819 CE)
- Preceded by: Musa al-Kazim
- Succeeded by: Muhammad al-Jawad
- Title: al-Rida (lit. 'the approved one')

Personal life
- Born: c. 1 January 766 (11 Dhu al-Qa'da 148 AH) Medina, Hejaz, Abbasid Caliphate
- Died: c. 6 June 818 (aged 52) (30 Safar 202 AH) Tus, Persia, Abbasid Caliphate
- Cause of death: Poisoning by Al-Ma'mun (Shia, some Western sources)
- Resting place: Harun al-Rashid Mausoleum, Imam Reza shrine, Mashhad, Iran; 36°17′13″N 59°36′56″E
- Spouse: Sabika (or Khayzuran); Umm Habib bint Al-Ma'mun
- Children: Muhammad al-Jawad; Hasan; Husayn; Ja'far; Ibrahim; A'isha; Fatima
- Parents: Musa al-Kazim; Najma
- Relatives: Ali al-Akbar; Ali al-Asghar; Fatima al-Kubra; Fatima al-Sughra; Ruqayya; Sabze Ghaba (brother)

Religious life
- Religion: Shia Islam

Ali ibn Musa al-Rida (Arabic: علي بن موسى الرضا, romanized: ʿAlī ibn Mūsā al-Riḍā, c. 1 January 766 – c. 6 June 818), also known as Abū al-Ḥasan al-Thānī, was a descendant of the Islamic prophet Muhammad, and the eighth Imam in Twelver Shia Islam, succeeding his father, Musa al-Kazim, in 799 CE. He is also part of the chain of mystical authority in Sunni Sufi orders. He was known for his piety and learning, and a number of works are attributed to him, including Al-Risalah al-Dhahabiah, Sahifah of al-Ridha, and Fiqh al-Rida. Uyoun Akhbar Al-Ridha by Ibn Babawayh is a comprehensive collection that includes his religious debates and sayings, biographical details, and even the miracles which have occurred at his tomb. He is buried in Mashhad, Iran, site of a large shrine.

Al-Rida was contemporary with the Abbasid caliphs Harun al-Rashid (r. 786–809) and his sons, al-Amin (r. 809–813) and al-Ma'mun (r. 813–833). In a sudden departure from the established anti-Shia policy of the Abbasids, possibly to mitigate the frequent Shia revolts, al-Mamun invited al-Rida to Merv in Khorasan, his de facto capital, and designated him as heir apparent, despite the reluctance of the al-Rida who accepted the offer on the condition that he would not interfere in governmental affairs. The appointment of Ali al-Rida by the Abbasid al-Mamun immediately invoked strong opposition, particularly among the Abbasids, who revolted and installed Ibrahim ibn al-Mahdi, a half-brother of Harun al-Rashid, as the anti-caliph in Baghdad. Realising the severity of the Iraqi opposition, al-Mamun and his entourage left Khorasan for Baghdad, accompanied by al-Rida. The Imam, however, died mysteriously when the party reached Tus in September 818. His death followed shortly after the assassination of al-Fadl ibn Sahl, the Persian vizier of al-Mamun, who was publicly seen as responsible for his pro-Shia policies. The caliph is often seen as responsible for both deaths, as he made concessions to the Arab party to smooth his return to Baghdad. Tus was later replaced with a new city, called Mashhad, which developed around the grave of al-Rida as the holiest site in Iran, to which millions of Shia Muslims flock annually for pilgrimage.

== Life ==
=== Birth and early life ===
Ali was born in Medina in 148 AH (765/766 CE), 151 AH (768/769 CE), or 153 AH (769/771 CE). The first date is said to be based on a prediction ascribed to his grandfather, al-Sadiq, who died in that year, that the successor to his son al-Kazim would be born soon. There are some indications that Ali might have been born as late 159 AH (775/776 CE). In any case, the date often given by Shia authorities is 11 Du al-Qa'da 148 AH (765/766 CE). His father was al-Kazim, the seventh Twelver Shia Imam, who was a descendant of Ali and Fatima, cousin and daughter of the Islamic prophet, respectively. His mother was a freed slave, probably of Berber origin, whose name is recorded differently in various sources, perhaps Najma or Tuktam. It was reputedly Ja'far al-Sadiq, the father of al-Kazim, who chose Najma for him. Momen writes that Ali was thirty-five years old when his father died, whereas Donaldson holds that he was twenty or twenty-five at the time.

=== During Harun's rule ===
Al-Rida lived with his father Musa al-Kazim in Medina until 179 AH (795/796 CE). When Harun arrested Musa and transferred him to Iraq, he took care of Musa's property and the affairs of the Shias as the attorney of his father. With the death of Musa al-Kazim in Baghdad prison in Rajab 183 AH (799/800 CE), his son Ali al-Rida became his heir and successor, according to his father's will.

According to Madelung, al-Kazim had appointed al-Rida as his executor and al-Rida also inherited his father's property near Medina, excluding his brothers. According to Musa al-Kazim will, the custody of his children, wives and property was also entrusted to Ali al-Rida. Ali spent the next ten years of his life—from 183 AH (799/800 CE) to 193 AH (808/809 CE)—in the reign of Harun.

=== Civil war and unrest ===
The Abbasid caliph Harun died during the imamate of al-Rida and the empire was split between his two sons: the reigning caliph, al-Amin, who was born to an Arab mother, and al-Mamun, who was born of a Persian mother and was designated as the successor and the governor of the province of Khorasan in present-day Iran. In effect, according to Momen, al-Amin controlled Iraq and the west with his Arab vizier, al-Fadl ibn Rabi, while al-Mamun controlled Iran and the east with his Persian vizier, al-Fadl ibn Sahl. Al-Amin reportedly violated these arrangements by appointing his son as successor in place of Mamun, and soon a civil war ensued in which al-Amin was killed and Baghdad was occupied by al-Mamun's general, who nevertheless remained in Merv in Khorasan, apparently determined to make there his new capital. Al-Rida, who, according to a tradition narrated by Ibn Babawayh and al-Tabarsi, had informed one of his companions that Ma'mun would kill Amin, kept himself away from the conflicts between the two. The period of Amin's caliphate is said to be the time of peace for al-Rida, during which he found the opportunity to fulfill his mission of spreading the Islamic teachings.

Al-Mamun claimed for himself the title of Imam al-Huda (lit. 'rightly-guided leader'), possibly to imply that he was best qualified for the caliphate. Notably, he faced costly revolts in Kufa and Arabia by Alids and Zaydis, who intensified their campaign against the Abbasids around 815 CE, seizing the cities of Mecca, Medina, Wasit, and Basra. In particular, the Shia revolt by Abu'l-Saraya in 815 was difficult to suppress in Iraq, and compelled al-Hasan ibn Sahl, al-Mamun's governor of Iraq, to deploy the troops of the Khorasani general Harthama.

Throughout the years, several of al-Rida's brothers and his uncle Moḥammad ibn Ja'far participated in the Alid revolts in Iraq and Arabia, but al-Rida refused any involvement. In this period, al-Rida's only involvement in politics might have been to mediate between the Abbasid government and his uncle Muḥammad ibn Ja'far, who had revolted in Mecca.

=== Appointment as heir apparent ===
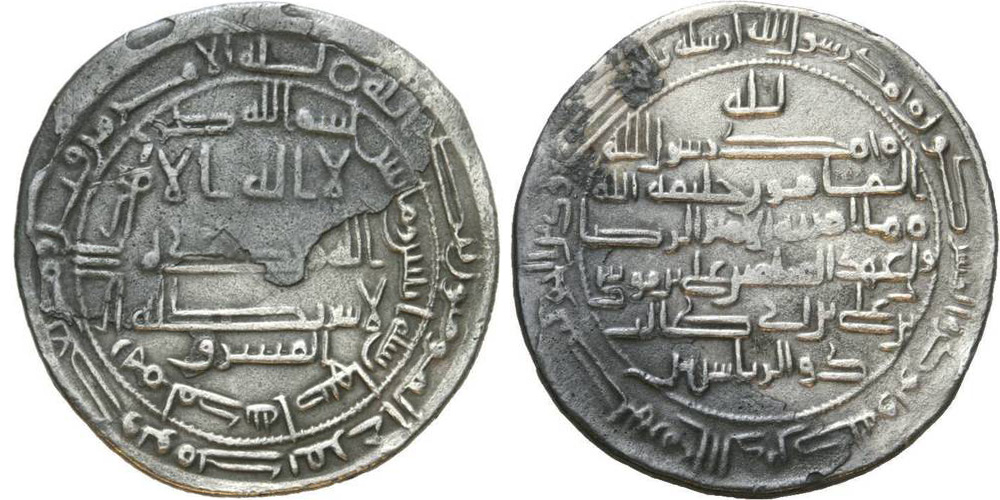
Silver Abbasid dirham, minted at Isfahan in 817, citing al-Ma'mun as caliph and Ali al-Ridha as heir apparent (wali ahd al-muslimin)

Departing from the established anti-Shia policies of his predecessors, al-Mamun invited al-Rida to Khorasan in 816 CE, and designated him as successor in 817. According to Madelung, al-Mamun wrote to al-Rida in 200 AH (815/816 CE), invited him to come to Merv, and also sent Raja ibn Abi'l Zahhak, cousin of his vizier, and a eunuch to accompany al-Rida on this trip. In the same year, al-Rida might have also made the pilgrimage to Mecca with his five-year-old son Muhammad al-Jawad. After some initial resistance, al-Rida set out for Merv in 816. According to a narration that some ancient sources have confirmed, Ma'mun had ordered that the Imam not be taken via Kufa and Qom, as he was worried that the feelings of the Shias of these cities in their friendship with the Imam would create problems for him (Ma'mun).

Though he did not pass through Qum on his way to Merv, he stayed for some time in Nishapur, where prominent Sunni traditionists visited him, including Ibn Rahuya, Yahya ibn Yahya, Moḥammad ibn Rafe', and Ahmad ibn Ḥarb. Al-Rida continued on to Marv after receiving a new summons from al-Mamun.

A number of Sunni hadith scholars also asked al-Rida to narrate a hadith for them that has become known as the Hadith of Golden Chain.

In Merv, al-Mamun first offered al-Rida the caliphate, though this was turned down by the latter. According to Madelung, al-Rida resisted al-Mamun's proposals for about two months until he reluctantly consented to an appointment as heir to the caliphate. The sources seem to agree that al-Rida was reluctant to accept this nomination, ceding only to the insistence of the caliph, with the condition that he would not interfere in governmental affairs or the appointment or dismissal of government agents. On 2 Ramadan 201 AH (23 March 817) by one account, the dignitaries and army leaders in Merv pledged their allegiance to the new heir apparent, who was dressed in green. An official announcement was made in the mosques throughout the empire, coins were minted to commemorate the occasion, and al-Mamun also changed the color of uniforms, official dress, and flags from black, the official Abbasid color, to green. This move possibly signified the reconciliation between the Abbasids and the Alids. To strengthen their relations, al-Mamun also married his daughter to al-Rida and promised another daughter to al-Rida's son in Medina, a minor at the time.

==== Motives ====
The motivations of al-Mamun for this appointment are not fully understood. At the time, he justified his decision by maintaining that al-Rida was the most suitable person for the caliphate. The reluctance of al-Rida in accepting this designation, however, might reflect his suspicion that al-Mamun had ulterior motives. With an age gap of more than twenty years, it also seems unlikely that al-Rida would ever have succeeded the much younger al-Mamun. With this appointment, some have suggested that al-Mamun hoped for the support of the Shia and respite from their numerous revolts. Others have suggested that al-Mamun was influenced by his powerful Persian vizier, af-Fadl ibn Sahl, who had Shia tendencies. Madelung, however, finds it more likely that the initiative to appoint al-Rida belonged to al-Mamun and not his vizier. Some authors have not found the appointment surprising, noting the strained or severed relations of the caliph with his Abbasid relatives. Yet others have written that al-Mamun wanted a merit-based caliphate, though he made no mention of rules governing the succession to al-Rida during the ceremony. It has been suggested that al-Mamun might have wanted to heal the Sunni-Shia division, while Lapidus and others hold that al-Mamun wanted to expand his authority by adopting the Shia views about the divine authority of religious leaders, alongside his later religious inquisition (mihna). Bayhom-Daou considers it likely that al-Mamun saw this appointment as a means of discrediting the Shia doctrine of Imamate, and Tabatabai writes that al-Mamun might have also hoped to undermine the position of al-Rida as a Shia religious leader by engaging him in politics.

Al-Rida's rejection of al-Mamun's initial offer for replacing him as the caliph has been used to argue that al-Rida's ultimate aim was not temporal and political power. Rather, Mavani suggests that such power was merely a means for the Imam to reach the ultimate goal of guiding the community to salvation. When al-Rida was asked why he accepted the successorship, he is reported to have emphasized his unwillingness, responding, "The same thing which forced my grandfather the Commander of the Faithful [Ali ibn Abi Talib] to join the arbitration council [i.e., coercion]". To show his dissatisfaction with the trip to Khorasan, as reported by Ibn Babuyyah, al-Rida not only refused to take his family with him but also asked them to cry loudly for him, saying that he would never return to his family's embrace. It also appears that this appointment did not alienate any of the followers of al-Rida which, according to Bayhom-Daou, might imply that they were convinced that he was a reluctant player who had no choice but to accept his designation as the heir apparent.

==== Reactions ====
Perhaps incorrectly, the appointment of al-Rida was at the time largely attributed to the influence of al-Mamun's Persian vizier, al-Fadl ibn Sahl. Nevertheless, various Abbasid governors, with the exception of Ismail ibn Jafar in Basra, loyally carried out their orders and exacted the oath of allegiance to the new heir. The appointment of the Alid al-Rida by the Abbasid al-Mamun apparently brought him the support of several notable Alids and nearly all the Zaydite partisans. It also immediately invoked strong opposition, particularly among the Abbasids and Arab Sunni nationalists. Al-Mamun's decision did not carry the public opinion of the Iraqis, who declared him deposed and installed Ibrahim ibn al-Mahdi, another Abbasid, as caliph in 817, while the popular militia roamed through Baghdad, demanding a return to the Quran and the Sunna. Ibrahim, a half-brother of al-Mamun's father, is said to have been a weak statesman and a mere figurehead, whose rule was largely confined to Baghdad. There were also military engagements in Baghdad, Kufa, and Wasit between al-Mamun's forces and the supporters of Ibrahim who were themselves much harassed by financial and logistical difficulties.

=== Tenure as heir apparent ===
Al-Rida was given a high status at the court of al-Mamun. While the caliph evidently desired that al-Rida should immediately engage in all official ceremonies, the latter is reported to have refrained, stipulating that he would not participate in government affairs. Al-Rida was given his own police force and guard, as well as a chamberlain and a secretary. The caliph is said to have relied on the judgment of al-Rida in religious questions and arranged for debates between him and scholars of Islam and other faiths. According to Rizvi, however, these religious disputations seem to have been designed as set pieces to embarrass al-Rida. Their accounts were later recorded by Ibn Babawayh in his Uyun akhbar al-Rida.

=== Return to Baghdad ===
The seriousness of the civil unrest in Iraq was apparently kept hidden from al-Mamun by his vizier until 818, and it was al-Rida who urged the caliph to return to Baghdad and restore peace. Al-Rida's assessment was supported by several army chiefs and al-Mamun thus left Khorasan in 818. Before their return, his vizier offered his resignation, pointing out the hatred of the Abbasids in Baghdad for him personally, and requested the caliph to leave him as governor in Khorasan. Al-Mamun instead assured the vizier of his unrestricted support and published a letter to this effect throughout the empire. However, six months later, in Sha'ban 202 (February 818), the vizier was assassinated in Sarakhs by several army officers as he accompanied al-Mamun back to Baghdad. Those responsible were soon executed, but not before declaring that they had been acting on the orders of the caliph. Henceforth, al-Mamun governed with the help of counsellors on whom he did not confer the title of vizier.

== Death and burial ==
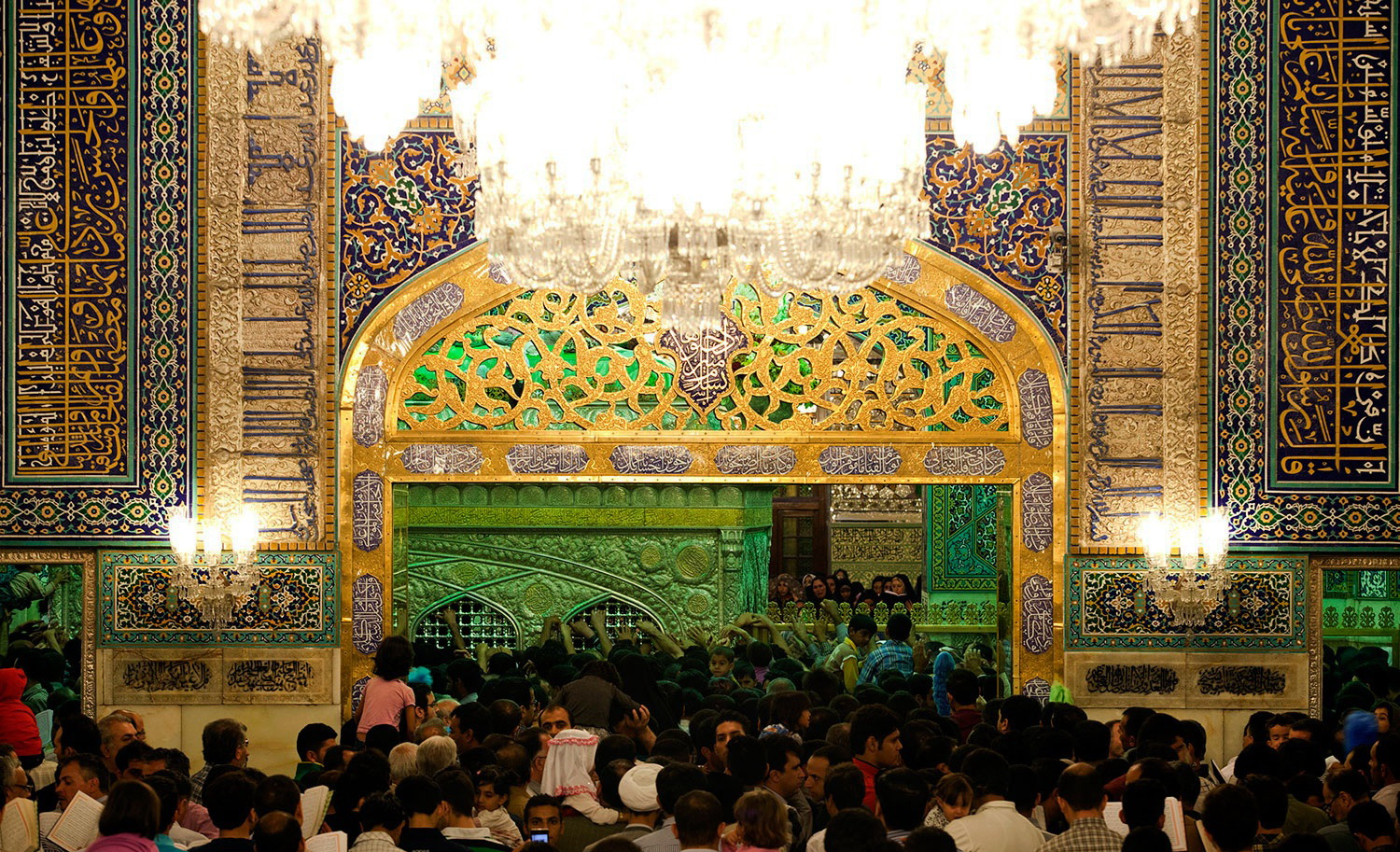
Pilgrims of the shrine of al-Rida in Mashhad, Iran

Al-Rida died in Tus (present-day Mashhad) on the last day of Safar 203 (September 818), probably poisoned. Other given dates range from Safar 202 (September 817) to Dhu al-Qadah 203 (May 819). The sources seem to agree that al-Rida died after a short illness as he accompanied al-Mamun and his entourage back to Baghdad. His death followed shortly after the assassination of al-Fadl ibn Sahl, the Persian vizier of al-Mamun, who had become a divisive figure. Both deaths are attributed in Shia sources to al-Mamun as he made concessions to the Arab party to smooth his return to Iraq. Madelung writes that the sudden deaths of the vizier and the heir apparent, whose presence would have made any reconciliation with the powerful Abbasid opposition in Baghdad virtually impossible, strongly suggest that al-Mamun was responsible for them. This opinion is echoed by Hugh N. Kennedy and Bobrick, and Bayhom-Daou considers this the prevalent view among Western historians. Similarly, Rizvi writes that the sudden reversal of al-Mamun's pro-Shia policies and his attempt to eradicate the memory of al-Rida might support the accusations against the caliph. In contrast, the Sunni historians al-Tabari and al-Masudi, who both lived under the Abbasids, do not consider the possibility of murder. In particular, al-Masudi writes that al-Rida died as a result of consuming too many grapes. Alternatively, the Shia scholar Muhammad Husayn Tabataba'i believed that al-Mamun poisoned al-Rida given the growing popularity of the latter and the immediate proliferation of the Shia teachings. Some Sunni authors seem to have also adopted the Shia practice of referring to al-Rida's death as martyrdom.

The caliph then asked a group of Alids to examine the body of al-Rida and testify that he had died of natural causes. At the funeral, al-Mamun recited the last prayers himself. The reports note his display of grief during the funeral. Madelung does not view these emotions as necessarily insincere, noting that on other occasions in the reign of al-Mamun, cold political calculation appears to have outweighed the personal sentiments and ideals. A year later, in Safar 204 (August 819), the caliph entered Baghdad without a fight. The anti-caliph, Ibrahim ibn al-Mahdi, had already fled from the city several weeks earlier. The return to Baghdad marked the end of the pro-Shia policies of al-Mamun, and was followed by the return to the traditional black color of the Abbasids.

=== Shrine ===
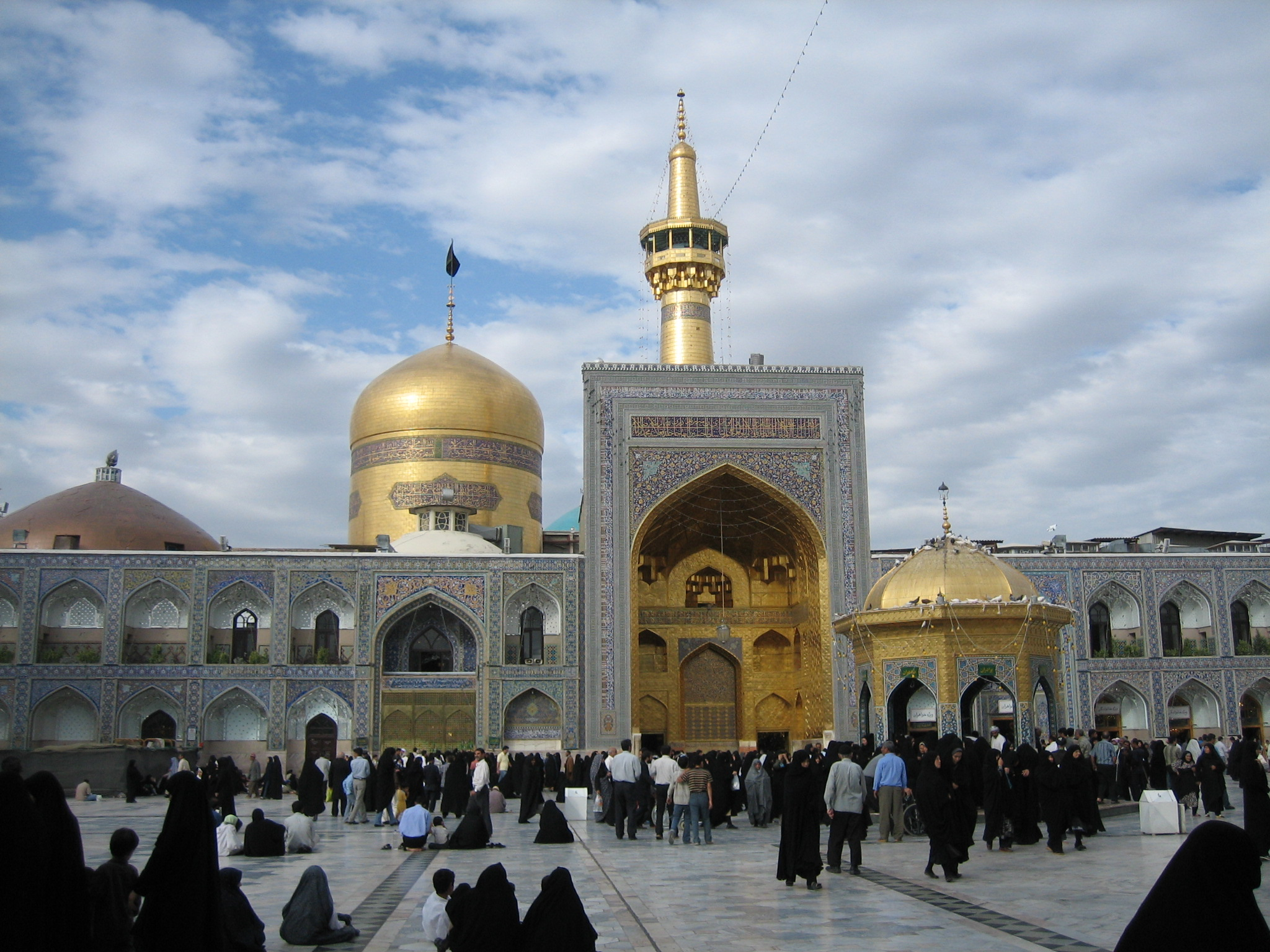
The shrine of al-Rida in Mashhad, Iran

Al-Mamun buried al-Rida in Tus next to his father, Harun al-Rashid, in the Harun al-Rashid Mausoleum. Tus was later replaced with a new city, called Mashhad (lit. 'place of martyrdom'), developed around the grave of al-Rida as the holiest site in Iran for the Shia. The present shrine dates to the fourteenth century, when the Il-khan Öljaitü converted to Twelver Shi'ism. Most of the elaborate decorative work in the present imposing complex dates from Safavid and Qajar periods. Adjacent to the shrine is the Goharshad Mosque, one of the finest in Iran, named after the wife of the Timurid emperor Shah Rukh and completed in 1394. Several theological colleges have been built around the shrine, the most famous of which is that of Mirza Ja'far Khan.

=== Rituals ===
The traditional ritual of Khutbeh Khani (lit. 'reciting sermon') is held annually on the night of al-Rida's death. The ritual, dating back to governor Ali Shah of Khorasan in 1160 AH, involves the servants of the holy site walking from the nearest street to Inqilab yard with candles in their hands. There, they stand around the yard and the crowd recites religious sermons and praise God. This ritual is also repeated on the night of Ashura.

== Imamate ==
The imamate of al-Rida overlapped with the reigns of the Abbasid Harun al-Rashid and his sons, al-Amin and al-Mamun. He initially adopted a quiescent attitude and kept aloof from politics, similar to his predecessors, namely, the fourth through seventh Shia Imams; and he refused to officially approve and accompany the uprisings of the Alids. Therefore, the Zaydis, who followed the method of armed struggle, were against him. According to al-Rida, armed conflict is not the best way to fight when there are rulers who do not tolerate any kind of Enjoining good and forbidding wrong. Based on this, al-Rida did not accept Muhammad bin Suleiman request to unite and accompany him. Also, it has been said that in a meeting with his uncle, Muhammad ibn Ja'far, the Imam warned him against opposing the way of his father and brother (Ja'far al-Sadiq and Musa al-Kazim) and warned him that his rebellion would be unsuccessful. The Imam even quarreled with his brother, Zayd ibn Musa al-Kazim, and left him. Nevertheless, al-Rida called the current situation in his time as the rule of a false government and the system of oppressors. By explaining the concept of "Ulu'l-amr" and the necessity of obeying them, he emphasized on following the Ahl al-Bayt and he considered the leadership of oppressors and obeying them to be invalid and wrong. Among the companions of al-Rida, there were those who, while appearing to accompany the government, had relations with the Imam and protected and supported the Shias from harm and oppression.

Al-Rida, known for his piety and learning, issued fatwas (legal rulings) at The Prophet's Mosque in Medina when he was still in his twenties and narrated hadith from his forefathers.

=== Designation ===
Al-Kazim designated his son, Ali al-Rida, as his successor before his death in Harun al-Rashid's prison in 799 (183 AH), following some years of imprisonment. Wilferd Madelung adds that al-Kazim had made al-Rida his legatee, and that al-Rida also inherited his father's estate near Medina to the exclusion of his brothers. After al-Kazim, al-Rida was thus acknowledged as the next Imam by a significant group of al-Kazim's followers, who formed the main line of Shia and went on to become the Twelvers. The brothers of al-Rida did not claim the imamate but a number of them revolted against the Abbasids. Some of the followers of al-Kazim, however, claimed that he had not died and would return as Mahdi, the promised savior in Islam. These became known as the Waqifite Shia (lit. 'those who stop') though it appears that they later returned to the mainstream Shia, declaring al-Rida and his successors as the lieutenants of al-Kazim. These also included the Bushariyya, named after Muhammad ibn Bashir, the gnostic from Kufa, who claimed to be the interim imam in the absence of al-Kazim.

During his Imamate, al-Rida fought fiercely against the leaders of the Waqifiyya, calling them enemies of the truth, wanderers, heretics, infidels, and polytheists. In one case, he compared the Waqifiyya with the Jews and stated that verse 64 of Surah Al-Ma'idah was revealed about the Waqifiyya because they, like the Jews, doubted the continuity of the Imamate because no child had yet been born to the Imam and attributed impotence to God. The term Waqifiyya is applied generally to any group who denies or hesitates over the death of a particular Shia Imam and refuses to recognize his successors.

According to Kohlberg, the creation of Waqifiyya might have had a financial reason. Some of the representatives of al-Kazim evidently refused to hand over to al-Rida the monies entrusted to them, arguing that al-Kazim was the last Imam. These included Mansur ibn Yunus Buzurg and Ali ibn Abi Ḥamza al-Bataini, Ziyad ibn Marwan al-Kandi, Uthman ibn Isa al-Amiri al-Ruasi (Ruwasi). Some reports indicate that al-Ruasi repented.

=== Succession ===
Muhammad, the only child of al-Rida, was seven years old when his father died. The succession of the young Muhammad, who later became known as al-Jawad (lit. 'the generous'), became controversial among the followers of his father. A group of them instead accepted the imamate of al-Rida's brother, Ahmad ibn Musa. Another group joined the Waqifiyya, who considered al-Kazim to be the last Imam and expected his return as Mahdi. Some had opportunistically backed the imamate of al-Rida after his appointment as successor to the caliphate and now returned to their Sunni or Zaydi communities. Tabatabai, however, regards the divisions in Shia after al-Rida as insignificant and often temporary. Twelver scholars have noted that Jesus received his prophetic mission in the Quran when he was still a child, and some hold that al-Jawad had received the requisite perfect knowledge of all religious matters through divine inspiration from the time of his succession, irrespective of his age.

=== Karamat ===
Often viewed as evidence of his divine favor, various nonprophetic miracles (karamat, sing. karama) have been attributed to al-Rida. During his stay in Nishapur, it is said that the Imam planted an almond in the house where he stayed, which grew into a tree and bore fruit the next year. Also, in the Imam's residence, there was a ruined bathhouse and a barren qanat, but when the Imam arrived, the water in that qanat flowed again, and the people rebuilt that bathhouse, and it was named after the Imam, and people sought blessings from that tree and this bathhouse.

After leaving Nishapur, Reza reached a village named Sanabad and went to the palace of Humayd ibn Qahtaba and entered the courtyard where Harun al-Rashid's grave was located. According to Ibn Babawayh, al-Rida drew a line next to that grave and said, "This will be my tomb".

As related by Ibn Babuwayh, at the beginning of al-Rida's presence in Khorasan, it did not rain much. Al-Mamun asked al-Rida to pray for rain. He accepted and appointed Monday for this work. In the morning al-Rida went to the desert with the people and went to the pulpit and asked God for rain. After that, clouds appeared in the sky and when people returned to their homes, it started raining heavily. A large crowd gathered around al-Rida and people congratulated him on this honor. Donaldson includes the account of Reyyan ibn Salt who, when bidding farewell to his Imam, was so overcome with grief that he forgot to ask al-Rida for one of his shirts, to use as a shroud, and some coins, to make rings for his daughters. As Reyyan was leaving, however, al-Rida called to him, "Do you not want one of my shirts to keep as your shroud? And would you not like some pieces of money for rings for your daughters?" Reyyan left after al-Rida fulfilled his wishes.

Ibn Hibban a hadith scholar, writes in his work, Al-Thiqat, that he would frequently visit Imam Reza shrine and by praying over the grave of the Imam, the problems or difficulties he was facing would be resolved, and he had experienced this many times. Al-Hakim al-Nishapuri quoted Muhammad ibn Ali ibn Sahl, a jurist known as Masarjisi (d. 384), as saying that no problem in religious or worldly matters arose for me unless I sought out the grave of Ali ibn Musa and prayed there, and that problem and need were resolved.

== Titles and family ==
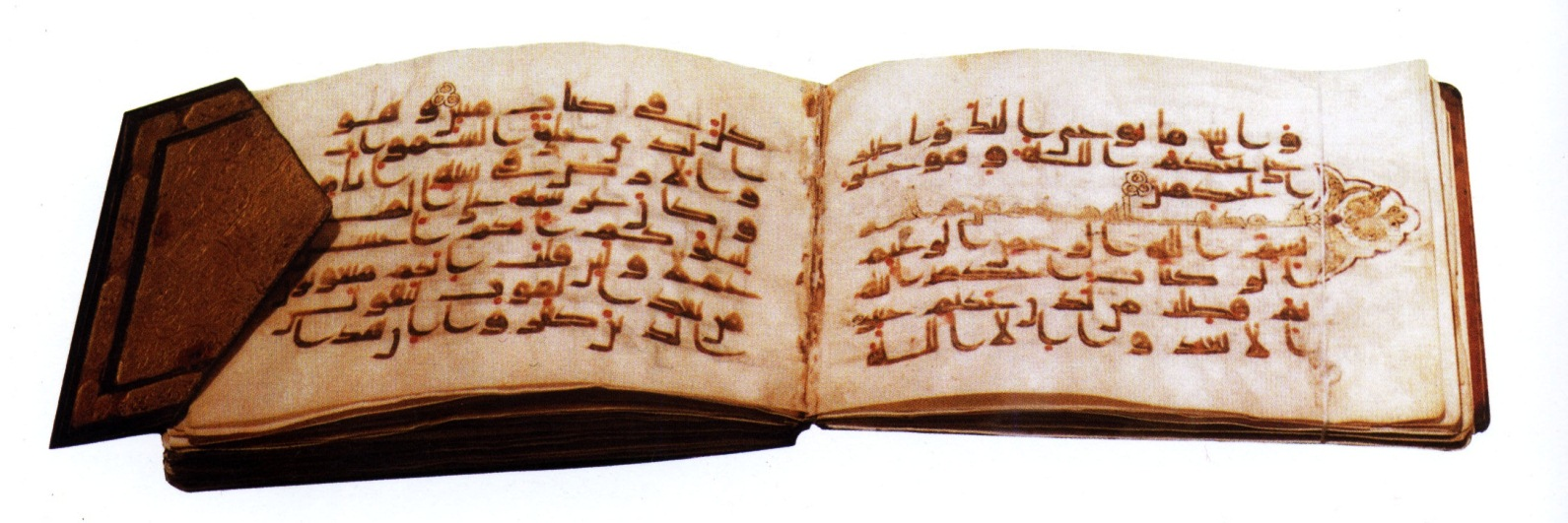
A copy of the Quran ascribed to al-Rida, preserved at the Astan Quds Razavi Central Museum

The title al-Rida (lit. 'the approved one') was reputedly bestowed upon him by the caliph, in a reference to a semi messianic descendant of Muhammad upon whom Muslims would agree for the caliphate (al-rida min al Muhammad), a rallying cry of the Shia and, earlier, of Abbasids against the Umayyads. He is commonly known in Iran and other countries in central Asia as Shah-i-Khorasan (the Emperor of Khorasan) this is well known in that region especially among Shia and Sufis. Muhammad al-Jawad, according to Ibn Babawiyah, stated that God called him Rida because his enemies and his friends were pleased with him, while this did not happen to any of his fathers. Al-Rida is also known as Abu al-Hasan al-Thani (lit. 'Abu al-Hasan, the second') to distinguish him from his father, Musa al-Kazim, who is also known as Abu al-Hasan al-Awwal (lit. 'Abu al-Hasan, the first').

In a move to strengthen their ties, al-Mamun had married his daughter, Umm Habib, to al-Rida, though no children resulted from that marriage. Muhammad, who later became known as Muhammad al-Jawad, was the child of al-Rida, born to Sabika (or Khayzuran), a freed slave (umm walad) from Nubia, who was said to have descended from the family of Maria al-Qibtiyya, a freed slave of the prophet and mother of his son Ebrahim, who died in childhood. There is a disagreement as to the number of children Ali al-Rida had. Some have reported them as five sons and one daughter with the names of Muhammad, Hasan, Ja'far, Ibrahim, Husayn and A'isha. According to Ibn Hazm al-Rida had three sons named Ali, Muhammad, and Hussein, whose lineage continued through Muhammad. While others mentioned the existence of a daughter of Ali al-Rida called Fatima.

Hadiths of al-Rida and Muhammad al-Jawad indicate that al-Rida had only one son namely Muhammad al-Jawad and the al-Rida's lineage continued through him.

== Views ==
In addition to Shia authorities, Sunni biographical sources also list al-Rida as one of the narrators of prophetic hadiths, and al-Waqidi considers him a reliable transmitter. As a Shia Imam who rejected the authority of Muhammad's companions as hadith transmitters, initially only the Shia transmitted hadith on the authority of al-Rida. In his later years, however, notable Sunni traditionists were said to have visited him, including Ishaq ibn Rahwayh and Yahya ibn Yahya. In particular, his appointment as the heir apparent seemed to have added to the credibility to al-Rida in Sunni circles, who at the time apparently came to regard him as a distinguished transmitter by virtue of his learning and descent from the prophet. In view of his continued veneration as a Shia Imam, later Sunni authors were divided about the authority of al-Rida, some saying that he was not always a reliable transmitter and others instead questioning the authority of those who transmitted from al-Rida. They all seem to refer to him as a man of piety and learning.

It has been commonly held that Ma'ruf al-Karkhi, who converted to Islam at the hands of al-Rida, is a prominent figure in the golden chain of most Sufi orders. He is said to have been a devoted student of al-Rida, though Bayhom-Daou regards the accounts of their encounters as apocryphal. In Sufi tradition, al-Rida is regarded as a model of asceticism, and the chains of authority in Shia Sufi orders progress through al-Rida, followed by al-Karkhi. One such instance is the Shah Nimatullah Wali order.

Among the poets who wrote poems in praise of al-Rida were Abu Nuwas and Di'bil ibn 'Ali al-Khuza'i, both Shia poets. Two famous Persian poets Sanai and Khaqani have also written poems about the desire to visit the al-Rida's shrine. Sanai expressed his deep feelings and belief in al-Rida in a famous and long poem, in which he compared the al-Rida's shrine to the Kaaba in terms of crowding. For Khaqani Khorasan was the Qibla of religion and spirituality.

== Works ==
Al-Risalah al-Dhahabiah (lit. 'the golden treatise') is a treatise on medical cures and the maintenance of good health which was reputedly commissioned by al-Mamun, who requested it in gold ink, hence the name. The studies by Speziale (2004) and Speziale - Giurini (2009) have critically analysed the issue of the authorship of the text. The book was text edited in Bombay and included by Majlesi in his Bihar al-Anwar. A number of commentaries have been written to it and it has been translated into Persian and Urdu. Despite questions concerning its authenticity, the book remains popular among the Twelver Shia.

Sahifah of al-Ridha is a collection of 240 hadiths, mentioned in some early Twelver sources and ascribed to al-Rida. Fiqh al-Rida, also called al-Fiqh al-Radawi, is a treatise on jurisprudence (fiqh) attributed to al-Rida. It was not known till the tenth century (sixteenth century CE) when it was judged to be authentic by Muhammad Baqir Majlisi but later Twelver scholars have doubted its authenticity, including S.H. Sadr. Other works attributed to al-Rida are listed in A'yan al-Shia. Additionally, Shia sources contain detailed descriptions of his religious debates, sayings, and poetry. Uyoun Akhbar Al-Ridha by Ibn Babawayh is a comprehensive collection that includes the religious debates, sayings, biographical details, and even the miracles which have occurred at his tomb.

== Debates ==
Al-Ma'mun showed interest in theological questions and organized debates between the scholars of different sects and religions in which al-Rida participated. One of these debates was about Divine Unity, led by Sulaiman al-Mervi, a scholar from Khorasan. Another discussion with Ali ibn Muhammad ibn al-Jahm was devoted to the infallibility of the prophets, which led to another session on the same subject when al-Mamun took part in the debate himself. Many of these debates are recorded in the collections of Shia hadiths, such as Uyoun Akhbar Al-Ridha. The following is an excerpt from a debate between Al-Rida and an unbeliever (zindiq).

- Al-Rida said to a zindiq, "Dost thou see that if the correct view is your view then are we not equal? All that we have prayed, fasted, given the alms and declared our convictions will not harm us. If the correct view is our view then have not you perished and we gained salvation?"
- The man said, "Then let me know, how is He and where is He?" Al-Rida answered, "Surely the opinion thou hast adopted is mistaken. He determined the "where", and He was, when there was "no where"; and He fashioned the "how", and He was, when there was "no how". So He is not known through "howness" or "whereness"."
- The man said, "So then surely He is nothing if He cannot be perceived by any of the senses". Al-Rida responded, "When our senses fail to perceive Him, we know for certain that He is our Lord and that He is something different from other things (shay' bi-khilaf al-asha)".
- The man said, "Then tell me, when was He?" Al-Rida said, "Tell when He was not, and then I will tell you when He was".
- The man said, "Then what is the proof of Him?" Al-Rida responded, "Surely when I contemplate my body and it is impossible for me to increase or decrease its breadth and height, or to keep unpleasant things away from it or draw benefits to it, then I know that this structure has a maker and I acknowledge Him-even though that which I had seen of the rotation of the celestial sphere through His power; the producing of clouds; the turning about of the winds; the procession of the sun, the moon and the stars; and others of His wondrous and perfectly created signs (ayat), had (already) made me know that (all) this has a Determiner (muqaddir) and Producer (munshi')".
- The man said, "Then why has He veiled Himself (from men)?" Al-Rida replied, "Surely the veil is upon creatures because of the abundance of their sins. As for Him, no secret is hidden from Him during the day or the night". The debate continued and this episode ended with the zindiq professing Islam.

== Character ==
Al-Rida is represented in historical sources as a thoughtful and likable man. He was of medium height, according to Ibn Sabbagh, and his skin color was dark or wheatish. He ate slowly and little and used to wear cheap and rough clothes, but when he met people, he wore luxurious clothes.

When he laughed, he did not giggle and smiled. He used to sit and eat with his slaves. He did not make his guests to work for him and tried to respect them in the best possible way. Byzanti relates that when he visited al-Rida for a few hours, al-Rida invited him to stay for the night and spread his own bed for Byzanti. Muhammad ibn Ghaffar narrates that when he visited al-Rida to ask for financial help, al-Rida fulfilled his wish before he mentioned his need and then invited Muhammad to stay overnight as his guest. When he was in Khorasan, he distributed all his wealth among the people on the Day of Arafat.

== See also ==
- Al-Fadl ibn Shadhan of Nishapur
- Waqifite Shia
- Reign of Love (TV series)
- Hajar Khatoon Mosque
- The Twelve Imams
- Hadith of Golden Chain
- Al-Risala al-Dhahabia
- Al-Sahifa al-Rida

== Bibliography ==
- Madelung, W. (1985). "ʿALĪ AL-REŻĀ". Encyclopaedia Iranica. Vol. I/8. pp. 877–880.
- Fabrizio Speziale, La Risāla al-dahabiyya, traité médical attribué à l'imām 'Alī al-Riżā. Luqman - Annales des Presses Universitaires d'Iran, vol. XX, n. 2 (40), 2004 (2005), pp. 7–34, [ISSN 0259-904X]
- Fabrizio Speziale - Giorgio Giurini, 2009, Il Trattato aureo sulla medicina attribuito a l'imām 'Alī al-Riḍā, Palermo, Officina di Studi Medievali (series Machina Philosophorum).
- Rizvi, Sajjad H. (2006). "'ALI AL-RIDA". In Meri, Josef W. (ed.). Medieval Islamic Civilization - A-K, index. Taylor & Francis. pp. 35–36. ISBN 9780415966917.
- Donaldson, Dwight M. (1933). The Shi'ite Religion (A history of Islam in Persia and Irak). London: Luzac and Company.
- Momen, Moojan (1985). An Introduction to Shi'i Islam. Yale University Press. ISBN 9780300034998.
- Tabatabai, Muhammad Husayn (1975). Shi'ite Islam. Translated and Edited by Seyyed Hossein Nasr. State University of New York Press. ISBN 0-87395-390-8.
- Cooperson, Michael (2013). "Ma'mun (786–833)". In Bowering, Gerhard; Crone, Patricia; Kadi, Wadad; Mirza, Mahan; Stewart, Devin J.; Zaman, Muhammad Qasim (eds.). The Princeton Encyclopedia of Islamic Political Thought. Princeton University Press. pp. 328–329. ISBN 9780691134840.
- Skyes, Percy (2013). A History of Persia. Vol. 2. Routledge. ISBN 9781136526046.
- Holt, P.M.; Lambton, Ann K.S.; Lewis, Bernard, eds. (1970). The Cambridge history of Islam. Vol. 1. Cambridge University Press.
- Glassé, Cyril, ed. (2008). "'Abbāsids". The New Encyclopedia of Islam. Alta Mira. pp. 11–14. ISBN 9781905299683.
- Hulmes, Edward D. A. (2008). "'ALI AL-RIDA". In Netton, Ian Richard (ed.). Encyclopedia of Islamic Civilisation and Religion. Routledge. p. 43. ISBN 978-0-7007-1588-6.
- Rahman, Habib Ur (1989). A Chronology of Islamic History, 570–1000. G. K. Hall & Co. ISBN 9780816190676.
- Daftary, Farhad (2013). A History of Shi'i Islam. I.B. Tauris. ISBN 9780755608669.
- Bobrick, Benson (2012). The Caliph's Splendor - Islam and the West in the Golden Age of Baghdad. Simon & Schuster. ISBN 978-1-4165-6806-3.
- Lewis, B. (2022). "ʿAlī Al-Riḍā". In Bearman, P. (ed.). Encyclopaedia of Islam (Second ed.). Brill Publishers.
- Medoff, Louis (2016). MOḤAMMAD AL-JAWĀD, ABU JAʿFAR. Encyclopædia Iranica.
- Tabatabai, Sayyid Muhammad Husayn (1981). A Shi'ite Anthology (PDF). Translated by Chittick, William C. SUNY Press. ISBN 9780873955119.
- Nicholson, R.A.; Austin, R.W.J. (2022). "Maʿrūf Al-Kark̲h̲ī'". In Bearman, P. (ed.). Encyclopaedia of Islam (Second ed.). Brill Publishers.
- Kennedy, Hugh (2015). The Prophet and the Age of the Caliphates - The Islamic Near East from the Sixth to the Eleventh Century. Routledge. ISBN 9781317376385.
- Corbin, Henry (2014). The History of Islamic Philosophy. Translated by Sherrard, Liadain. Routledge. ISBN 9781135198893.
- Sharif al-Qurashi, Baqir (1992). The life of Imām 'Ali ibn Mūsā al-Ridā. Translated by al-Rasheed, Jasim. Ansariyan Publications.
- "ʿAlī al-Riḍā". Encyclopædia Britannica. Encyclopædia Britannica. 2022.
- Attar, Farid al-Din (2013). Muslim Saints and Mystics - Episodes from the Tadhkirat al-Auliya' (Memorial of the Saints). Translated by Arberry, A.J. Routledge. ISBN 9781135030018.
- Madelung, W. (2022). "Muḥammad B. ʿAlī Al-Riḍā". In Bearman, P. (ed.). Encyclopaedia of Islam (Second ed.). Brill Publishers.
- Rahim, Habibeh (2004). "Kazim, Musa al-". In Jestice, Phyllis G. (ed.). Holy People of the World - A Cross-cultural Encyclopedia. Vol. 3. ABC-Clio. pp. 469–470. ISBN 9781576073551.
- Kohlberg, E. (2022). "Mūsā Al-Kāẓim". In Bearman, P. (ed.). Encyclopaedia of Islam (Second ed.). Brill Publishers.
- Mavani, Hamid (2013). Religious Authority and Political Thought in Twelver Shi'ism - From Ali to Post-Khomeini. Routledge. ISBN 978-0-415-62440-4.
- Bayhom-Daou, Tamima (2022). "ʿAlī Al-Riḍā". In Fleet, Kate (ed.). Encyclopaedia of Islam (Three ed.). Brill Publishers.
- Naji, Mohammad Reza; Baghestani, Ismail (2015). "الرضا، امام" [al-Reza, Imam]. Encyclopaedia of the World of Islam (in Persian). Vol. 20.
- Pierce, Matthew (2016). Twelve Infallible Men - The Imams and the Making of Shi'ism. Harvard University Press. ISBN 9780674737075.

Ali al-Rida of the Ahl al-Bayt Banu Hashim Clan of the Banu Quraish Born: 11th Dhul Qi'dah 148 AH ≈ 1 January 766 Died: 17th/30th Safar 203 AH ≈ 6 June 818
Shia Islam titles
Preceded by Musa al-Kazim	8th Imam of Twelver Shi'a Islam; 799–818	Succeeded by Muhammad al-Jawad
