= Mohammad Rezaei (wrestler, born 1958) =

Iranian wrestler

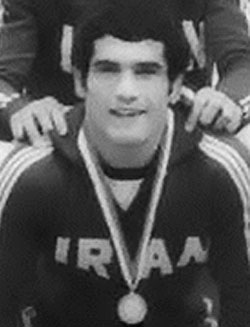
- Rezaei in 1978

Personal information
- Native name: محمد رضایی
- Born: 1958 (age 67–68) Tehran, Iran

Sport
- Sport: Freestyle wrestling
Medal record
Representing Iran
World Championships
Bronze medal – third place	1978 Mexico city	62 kg

Mohammad Rezaei (Persian: محمد رضايى, born 1958 in Tehran) is a retired Iranian lightweight freestyle wrestler. He won bronze medal at the 1978 World Championships and silver medal at world junior championships in 1977.
