= Ashab Uddin (general) =

Retired Major General of Bangladesh Army

- আসহাব উদ্দীন
- Born: Mohammad Ashab Uddin; 28 October 1958 (age 67); Beanibazar, East Pakistan, Pakistan
- Education: University of Madras
- Spouse: Farha Ashab Chowdhury
- Children: 2
- Military career
- Allegiance: Bangladesh
- Branch: Bangladesh Army
- Service years: 1979–2016
- Rank: Major General
- Unit: East Bengal Regiment
- Commands: Commandant of Defence Services Command and Staff College; GOC of 9th Infantry Division; GOC of 24th Infantry Division; Commander of 71st Infantry Brigade; Commander of 44th Infantry Brigade
- Conflicts: ONUMOZ; Bangladesh Rifles revolt
- Awards: United Nations Peacekeeping Medal

Ashab Uddin, ndc, psc (born 28 October 1958) is a retired major general of the Bangladesh Army. He has also served as Bangladesh's ambassador to Kuwait and Yemen.

== Early life ==
Ashab Uddin was born on 28 October 1958 in Matijura village of Tilpara union in Beanibazar, Sylhet. He married Farha Asab Chowdhury on 29 February 1988. The couple has a daughter and a son.

He passed SSC and HSC from Faujdarhat Cadet College. He graduated from the University of Chittagong. He holds postgraduate and postgraduate defense studies from the Department of Political Science at the National University. He holds a master's degree in national and international strategic studies (MPhil) from the University of Madras, India.

He completed several courses, including a military science course at the Defence Services Command and Staff College, a strategic course at the National Defence College of New Delhi, India, and an army staff course in Pakistan. He completed the reserve component in 1996, the special forces operation in 2003, and the senior executive course in the United States in 2008.

== Career ==
Ashab Uddin was commissioned in the Bangladesh Army in 1979 in the 1st BMA long course. He commanded two infantry battalions, two infantry brigades and served as general officer commanding (GOC) of two infantry divisions, and area commander of Savar and Chittagong areas. He also served as the director military training and military secretary in Army HQ. He was also the commandant of the Defence Services Command and Staff College. He retired from the Bangladesh Army in 2016.

He served as the ambassador of Bangladesh to the embassy in Kuwait and Yemen from 17 August 2013 to 2016. He was the president of the Bangladesh Shooting Sports Federation and of Bhatiary Golf & Country Club and Savar Golf Club.

=== UN mission ===
He has taken part in UN peacekeeping operations in Mozambique.

== Award ==
- United Nations Peacekeeping Medal
