= Sabr =

Patience as part of Islamic faith

Sabr (Arabic: صَبْرٌ, romanized: ṣabr) (literally 'endurance' or more accurately 'perseverance' and 'persistence') is one of the two parts of faith (the other being shukr) in Islam. It teaches to remain spiritually steadfast and to keep doing good actions in the personal and collective domain, specifically when facing opposition or encountering problems, setbacks, or unexpected and unwanted results. It is patience in the face of all unexpected and unwanted outcomes.

== Etymology ==
Arabic lexicographers suggest that the root ṣ-b-r, of which ṣabr is the nominalization, means to bind or restrain. The word ṣabr has a special technical application in the expression yamīn aṣ-ṣabr (يمين الصبر), which refers to perjury.

== In the Quran ==
In the Quran, words that are derived from the root ṣ-b-r occur frequently, with the general meaning of persisting on the right path when under adverse circumstance, whether internal or external, personal or collective. For example, Muhammad is told to be patient like the Apostles of God before him (38:16); (46:34). The Qur'an promises those who face difficulty and yet persist on the right path, a double reward ( 28:54). The concept is also in jihad, (3:140) where it is translated as "endurance" or "tenacity". It is also used when God commands Muslims to serve Him: XIX, 65, "Serve Him and persevere in His service." (19:65). Sometimes ṣabr is associated with the salāt (2:45, 2:153). According to the Qur'an commentators, ṣabr in these passages is synonymous with fasting, as the month of Ramadan was given the name s̲h̲ahr ṣabr (meaning month of patience).

The word is found with the meaning resignation(acceptance), for example in the sura of Yusuf, Yaqub(As.), on hearing of the death of his son, says "[My best course is] fitting resignation(acceptance)", where resignation(acceptance) is the most appropriate translation for sabar. The Quran also uses the adjective ṣabbār. This concept is related to shukr (meaning gratitude).

In Quran there is usually a close connection between being patiently persisting in doing right and expecting relief or deliverance from God (tawakkul). Thus Muhammad is told to be "patient till your Lord decides, for you are in Our sight".

- "Seek God (Allah)'s help with patient perseverance and prayer. It is indeed hard except for those who are humble." (2:45)
- "O you who believe! Seek help with patient perseverance and prayer, for God is with those who patiently persevere." (2:153)
- "Be sure We shall test you with something of fear and hunger, some loss in goods, lives, and the fruits of your toil."
- "But give glad tidings to those who patiently persevere. Those who say, when afflicted with calamity, 'To Allah we belong, and to Him is our return.' They are those on whom descend blessings from their Lord, and mercy. They are the ones who receive guidance." (2:155–157)
- "O you who believe! Persevere in patience and constancy. Vie in such perseverance, strengthen each other, and be pious, that you may prosper." (3:200)
- "And be steadfast in patience, for verily Allah will not suffer the reward of the righteous to perish." (11:115)
- "Be patient, for your patience is with the help of Allah." (16:127)
- "Patiently, then, persevere—for the Promise of Allah is true, and ask forgiveness for your faults, and celebrate the praises of your Lord in the evening and in the morning." (40:55)
- "No one will be granted such goodness except those who exercise patience and self-restraint, none but persons of the greatest good fortune." (41:35)
- "Verily man is in loss, except such as have faith, and do righteous deeds, and join together in the mutual enjoining of truth, and of patience (perseverance on good) and constancy." (103:2–3)
- "It is not righteousness that you turn your faces towards East or West. But it is righteousness to believe in Allah and the Last Day, And the Angels, and the Book, and the Messengers; To spend of your substance, out of love for Him, For your kin, for orphans, for the needy, for the wayfarer, for those who ask, and for the ransom of slaves; To be steadfast in prayer And give in charity; To fulfill the contracts which you have made; And to be firm and patient, in pain and adversity And throughout all periods of panic. Such are the people of truth, the God-fearing." Qur'an 2:177
- "Through every difficulty there is relief. Verily, through every difficulty there is relief." Qur'an 94:5–6

== Hadiths on significance of ṣabr ==
Abu Yahya Suhaib b. Sinan said that Muhammad said: "Wondrous are the believer's affairs. For him there is good in all his affairs, and this is so only for the believer. When something pleasing happens to him, he is grateful, and that is good for him; and when something displeasing happens to him, he is enduring (ṣabr), and that is good for him." ( Muslim )

Muhammad is reported to have said, "No one had ever been given anything better than ṣabr." From Sahih Bukhari and Sahih Muslim

Abu Musa al-Ashari reported that Muhammad said, "When a son of a servant of Allah dies, Allah Says to the angels, 'Have you taken the son of My servant?' They say, 'Yes.' Then Allah Says, 'Have you taken the fruit of his heart?' They say, 'Yes.' Allah Says, 'What has My servant said?' They say, 'He has praised You and said, ʾinnā li-llāhi wa-ʾinnā ʾilaihi rājiʿūn (To Allah we belong and to Him is our return). Then Allah Says, 'Build a house for My servant in Paradise and call it the house of praise.'" From Tirmidhi, Musnad Ahmad and ibn Habban.

== Quotes pertaining to ṣabr ==
Umar bin Khattab said, "We considered the best part of our lives to be that in which there was ṣabr." Related by al-Bukhārī (11/303) in taʿlīq form, and it has been related in connected form by Imām Ahmad in az-Zuhd with a Ṣaḥīḥ ʾisnād – as al-Ḥāfiẓ Ibn Hajar mentioned in Fatḥ al-Bārīʾ (11/303).

Ali said, "Indeed ṣabr is from ʾīmān (faith). Its position is like that of the head with respect to the rest of the body." Then he raised his voice and said, "Verily, there is no ʾīmān (faith) for the one who has no ṣabr." Related by Hibat Allāh ibn al-Ḥasan al-Lālakāʾī in Sharḥ ʾuṣūl ʾiʿtiqād ʾahl as-sunnah wa-al-jamāʿah (no. 1659), al-Bayhaqī in Shuʿūb al-ʾīmān and Abī Shaybān in Kitāb al-ʾīmān (no. 130), with a slightly different wording.

Imam Ahmad said, "Allāh has mentioned ṣabr (patient perseverance) in over ninety places in His Book (Quran)." Related by Ibn al-Qayyim in Madārij as-Sālikīn (2/152).

== Classification ==
Many Muslim scholars have tried to classify and give examples of ṣabr. According to the Encyclopaedia of Islam ṣabr is of two kinds:

1. physical, like the endurance of physical troubles, whether active (such as performing difficult tasks) or passive (such as suffering illnesses), and
2. the spiritual, such as renunciation in face of natural impulses.

Fakh̲r al-Dīn al-Rāzī distinguishes four kinds:

1. intellectual endurance (for example in disputed points in religious dogma),
2. endurance in completing tasks one is bound or recommended to do by Islamic law (such as fasting),
3. being steadfast in refraining from forbidden activities, and
4. resignation in times of calamity.

He also gives an application of the concept, Muṣābara, in which ones refrains from taking revenge from one's fellow-creature (like neighbors, People of the Book).

Al-Ghazali said that ṣabr consisted of three parts: maʿrifa (the tree), ḥāl (branches) and ʿamal (the fruits).

In addition to the above, Sabr was also classified as thus:

1. "Sabr in time of afflictions, that is; to bear the bitterness of troubles and misfortunes.
1. Sabr in obedience of Allah, that is; to bear the difficulty of performing what we are commanded.
1. Sabr in guarding against sins, that is;to stop and refrain from committing sins despite their attraction".

== Sabr in practice ==
According to Qur'an, a practical example of Sabr was described and stated as thus:

"Piety is not to turn your faces to the east or the west; rather, piety is [personified by] those who have faith in Allah and the Last Day, the angels, the Book, and the prophets, and who give their wealth, for the love of Him, to relatives, orphans, the needy, the traveller and the beggar, and for [the freeing of] the slaves, and maintain the prayer and give the zakat, and those who fulfil their covenants, when they pledge themselves, and those who are patient in stress and distress, and in the heat of battle. They are the ones who are true [to their covenant], and it is they who are the Godwary." (2:177).

=== Sabirun ===
Those who possess ṣabr to a certain extent are called ṣābirūn. Out of the three classes of beings (jinn, angels, and mankind), man alone may possess ṣabr. This is because the animals are entirely governed by their desires and impulses; and the angels are completely occupied by their longing for God, so they have no desires and thus need no ṣabr to overcome them. In man, however, the two impulses (that of desire and that of spirituality) are fighting, where the former is kindled by Satan and the latter by the angels.

Among mankind, there are the pious, who have attained ṣabr by overcoming their animal instincts, called siddiqūn, while some still struggle in this task. Sābirūn are to remain steadfast not only in health and prosperity (where their ṣabr is to be used as gratitude to God) but also in the performance of religious obligations, in refraining from forbidden things and in the event of uncontrollable calamities.

== Achieving sabr ==
1. "The true realisation of any moral virtue occurs when it becomes one’s second nature, such that the person acts according to it without much difficulty or pretention".
2. Another way to achieve this, is to act ‘as if’ one possesses the virtue, as it was quoted by Imam Ali; “If you are not tolerant, put on the garb of tolerance, because it rarely happens that one imitates a people and does not soon become one of them.”
3. Thus, practice and consistency help one develop this virtue as a matter of time.

== See also ==
- Political quietism in Islam
- Stiff upper lip
