= Shukr =

Thankfulness to God in Islam

Shukr (Arabic: شكر) is an Arabic term denoting thankfulness, gratitude or acknowledgment by humans, being a highly esteemed virtue in Islam. The term may also be used if the subject is God, in which case it takes the meaning of "divine responsiveness".

== Definition ==
According to Al-Raghib al-Isfahani, Shukr is to recognise a blessing and display it. It has been said that it was originally kashr, meaning ‘to unveil and expose,’ then the first two letters were swapped. Its opposite is kufr, which is ‘to cover, conceal, and forget a blessing.

== In Islamic contexts ==
God

- When the subject of shukr is God, the concept signifies "requiting and commending [a person]", "forgiving" a person, or "regarding" the person "with content, satisfaction, good will"; and thus, necessarily, "recompensing". In fact, the Arabic saying shakara 'llāhu saʿyahu means "May God recompense [or reward] his work [or labour]".
- One of the beautiful names of God is al-Shakūr, meaning "He who approves [or rewards, or forgives] much; He in whose estimation small [or few] works performed by His servants increase, and who multiplies His rewards to them". The Qur'an refers to Him by al-Shākir too.
- God is considered al-Shakūr in the sense that He widely extends His favors. God's shukr is not to be considered thankfulness in a literal sense. Rather, God's shukr is a recompense to man for doing good (just as man is recomposed for committing offenses). According to al-Ghazali, God is absolutely grateful because of His unlimited multiplication of the reward of the pious, as they shall receive eternal bliss in Paradise. Al-Maksad writes that God's praise for man's good deeds is praise for His own work, since the good of man is His creation.

Prophets: The Qur'an provides narratives of the prophets of God as individuals of gratitude. Their thanksgiving is exemplified by their obedience and faithfulness to God:

- Abraham's obedience and faithfulness were tokens of his gratitude to God;
- Noah is described as a man of gratitude;
- The Qur'an reasons that the endowment of Solomon with supernatural gifts to accomplish the ends for which God appointed him was so that he would be grateful.

== Shukr in Sunnah ==
- It had been narrated that when a pleasing event happened to the Messenger of God, he would say, “Praise be to God for this blessing,” and when a distressing event happened to him, he would say, “Praise be to God at all times.”
- It was reported that: One night that the Messenger of Allah was with ‘A’ishah, she said to him, “O Messenger of Allah, why do you exhaust yourself when God has forgiven you your former and latter sins?” The Prophet replied, “O ‘A’ishah, shouldn’t I be a grateful servant?”
- The hadith collections include various reports of Muhammad expressing gratitude to God. He fell down prostrate to God three times during the Hijra from Mecca to Medina. He is also reported to have done this after Gabriel informed him of a favor God had bestowed upon him. Muhammad also used to do this to thank God for his good health, especially when he met those afflicted with illness. Other instances on which Muhammad prostrated in thanks: military success and, conversion of notable people to Islam.

== Conditions for proper Shukr ==
- There are three conditions to a proper and complete praise of God: 1) To know God as the Giver of bounties, 2) To be pleased and satisfied with what He has given you, and 3) Not to use His bounty in the way of His disobedience.

== Reality of Shukr ==
In a Sufi context, shukr is an internal state and its external expression. It is considered a station (maḳām) of the wayfarer (sālik).

== Expression ==
The expression of shukr takes various forms in the Islamic religion and belief system. The maxim "he who does not thank his fellow men shows ingratitude towards God" highlights the importance of such an expression. On the other hand, those who are thanked are expected to say, "don't thank me; be grateful to God."

It is common practice to kiss one's hands and to say, "I praise Him and thank Him for His bounty." Another expression is "we are thankful to God, and we kiss the ground thousand fold that you are pleased." When asked about health, one may answer "thank God", gratitude to God is also commonly expressed for someone's recovery. In times of calamity, gratitude is expressed by saying, "thank God it is not more grave".

Shukr is also expressed by prostration (sujud). Although most notable for being a fundamental part of the Islamic prayer, Islamic traditions also mention the sujud al-shukr, literally meaning "the thanksgiving prostration."

== Examples of practical Shukr according to Islam ==
- Prayer
- Fasting
- Serving people
- Contentment
- Taking care of orphans.
- Assisting the deprived and the needy.
- Being grateful to others.

== Significants of Shukr according to Quran ==
- Shukr leads to the enhancement of blessings
- Shukr benefits he who performs it.
- Shukr is a sign of Worshipping Allah.
- Shukr gives us rest of mind.
- Shukr is a way of remembering Allah.
- Shukr is a way of disobedience to the commandment of Shaitan(devil) and obedience to Allah.
- Shukr is a sign of accepting Allah as the provider of favor.
- Shakr gains the pleasure of Allah.

== How to achieve Shukr ==
- "We must first identify and know the bounties and blessings bestowed upon us (both physical and spiritual).
- We must realize the fact that the blessings of Allah upon us are countless, thus, we can not thank Him as He deserves.
- In addition to these, we must realise that it is Allah who protected Us from all possible evils and misfortune that could have struck us.""

== See also ==
- Sabr
- Tawwakul
