= Yahya ibn Khalid =

Abbasid vizier and provincial governor (died c.806)

Yahya ibn Khalid يحيى بن خالد
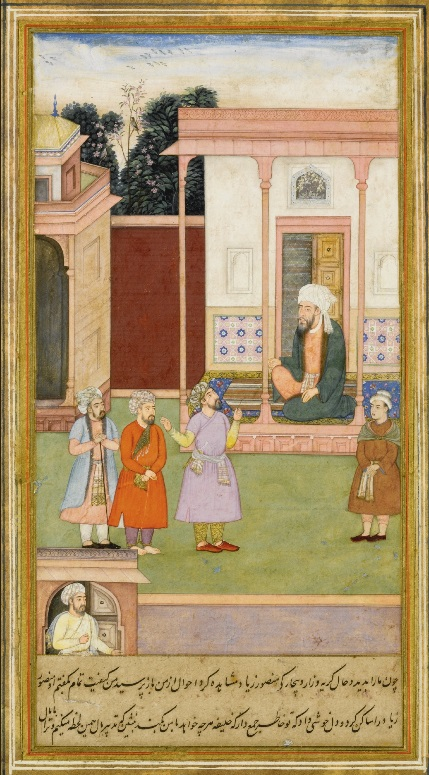
- "Mansur brought before Yahya Barmaki". An illustration to the Akhbar-i Barmakiyan, created in Mughal India, dated c. 1595–1600
- Died: c. 806; Abbasid Caliphate
- Other name: Abu al-Fadl
- Occupations: Abbasid vizier and Court official
- Years active: c. 786 – 803
- Children: Ja'far; Al-Fadl; Muhammad; Musa
- Father: Khalid ibn Barmak

Yahya ibn Khalid (Arabic: يحيى بن خالد, romanized: Yahyā ibn Khālid; died 806 CE) was the most prominent member of the Barmakid family, serving as provincial governor and all-powerful long-time vizier to Caliph Harun al-Rashid before his abrupt fall in 803.

== Origin and early career ==
Yahya was the son of Khalid ibn Barmak, the first member of the family to achieve prominence in the Abbasid court, serving as de facto chief minister to the first Abbasid caliph, al-Saffah (r. 749–754), and then in a number of provincial governorships in Fars, Tabaristan, and Mosul under al-Mansur (r. 754–775). Yahya gained his first experience in administration as his father's aide.

When his father was governor of Tabaristan in northern Iran (766/67–772), Yahya was appointed as his representative in Rayy, where the Caliph's son and heir, the future al-Mahdi (r. 775–785), was serving as viceroy for the eastern caliphate. While there, the two men became close, to the point that when al-Mahdi's younger son, the future Harun al-Rashid (r. 786–809) was born, he was nursed by Yahya's wife, Zubayda bint Munir, while al-Mahdi's wife, al-Khayzuran, nursed Yahya's young son al-Fadl, who had been born a few days earlier. This unique, and apparently accidental, relationship created strong bonds between them that proved crucial for the future fate of the Barmakids; by Arab custom, ties of fosterage were equivalent to blood kinship.

Already in 775, Yahya was himself appointed governor of Adharbayjan. When his father entered his second governorship of Fars under al-Mahdi (r. 775–785), Yahya once again accompanied him as his assistant.

In 778, he was named as the tutor and secretary to Harun, replacing Aban ibn Sadaka, and enhancing their relationship: Yahya became a sort of father figure to the young prince, while in turn Yahya and his family attached their fortunes to Harun. When Harun was sent, as his first independent command, to lead an expedition against the Byzantine Empire in 780, Yahya accompanied him. Yahya was placed in charge of the army's supplies, while he and the chamberlain al-Rabi ibn Yunus (who would become a political ally of Yahya) functioned as advisors to Harun on all military decisions. The expedition was a modest success, resulting in the capture of the fortress of Samalu, further strengthening Yahya's position. When Harun was proclaimed second heir (after his older brother, al-Hadi) and given charge of the provinces of Adharbayjan and Arminiya, Yahya administered these on his behalf.

== Under al-Hadi ==
When al-Mahdi died suddenly while hunting in July 785, Yahya was instrumental in ensuring a smooth succession and avoiding a riot of the troops, who were likely to use the opportunity to extract several years' of payment from the exchequer. Yahya and Queen al-Khayzuran kept the death secret, dismissed the troops with a gift of 200 dirhams, buried al-Mahdi, and sent for al-Hadi, who was then at Juzjan, to come to Baghdad and take over the throne. After the truth became known, the troops rioted and secured a payment of two years' worth of their salaries, but the immediate crisis had been averted.

After al-Hadi's accession, Yahya was confirmed in his position, but soon became involved in the struggle for the succession. Al-Hadi, now caliph, wanted to remove his brother from the succession and appoint his own son, Ja'far, instead. Harun himself appeared to be ready to acquiesce to this demotion, but this threatened Yahya's own position, which was dependent on Harun's status as heir-apparent. Consequently, along with al-Rabi ibn Yunus and the influential and powerful queen-mother al-Khayzuran, he tried to uphold Harun's position. At this time, Queen al-Khayzuran was the most powerful person in the caliphate, and al-Hadi hated this immense authority of his mother. Unlike al-Khayzuran, who did not hide her hostility to her older son, Yahya tried to mediate between the two brothers, urging Harun to a firmer defence of his rights, and al-Hadi to a more conciliatory stance. The rivalry between the two brothers was also the expression of a wider conflict, between a military faction, favoured by al-Hadi, and a courtly/bureaucratic faction, that rallied behind the Barmakids and al-Rabi ibn Yunus, with Harun as their candidate. The former clung to the traditional prerogatives of the troops that had brought the Abbasids to power, especially in the role of military leaders as provincial governors, while the newly emerging class of civil administrators (the kuttāb) and palace officials desired both a greater share of power as well as a centralization of authority in the central government and its civil departments.

In the end, in September 786, matters came to a head: Yahya was imprisoned and was about to be executed, but on the same night, al-Hadi was found dead. The exact cause of al-Hadi's death is unknown, but several sources imply that al-Khayzuran was responsible, by having one of her slave-girls suffocate the caliph in his sleep. On the same night, al-Hadi's young son was arrested and forced to renounce his rights to the succession, and the new regime installed. According to one version reported by al-Tabari, Harun freed Yahya once he was seated on the throne, while according to another, Yahya hurried to wake his sleeping protégé with the words, "Arise, O Commander of the Faithful".

== As vizier under Harun al-Rashid ==
Have you not seen that the sun was sickly,
but when Harun assumed power, its light gleamed forth.
Through the auspicious effects of the trusted one of God, Harun, the munificent one?
For Harun is its ruler, and Yahya its vizier.

— Poem by the court poet Ibrahim al-Mawsili on Harun al-Rashid's accession, relayed by al-Tabari

With Harun safely ensconced on the throne, Yahya was named vizier, with plenipotentiary authority over all affairs of government, as well as a free hand in choosing personnel. Even after the death of Queen-mother al-Khayzuran, Yahya was also awarded the position of keeper of the seal, with the sources reporting that the Caliph handed over his seal in person, to symbolize the powers vested in his vizier. Nevertheless, until her death in 789, al-Khayzuran remained in power control, with Yahya relying to her opinion and orders. The Caliph gave strict orders to Yahya to seek al-Khayzuran's approval in all of his decisions, a regulation which reduced the status of the Vizier to a subordinate of the queen mother. Her death changed everything; Yahya and his family (Barmakid) were out of her control, but lost a strong supporter.

Yahya made his two older sons, al-Fadl and Ja'far, his associates, sharing with them all duties and powers of his office, to the point that they also held the caliphal seal, and appear to also have been designated as viziers. From 788 until 795, Yahya's brother, Muhammad, also served as the Harun al-Rashid's chamberlain. This concentration of power inaugurated the period known in the sources as the "reign of the Barmakids" (sulṭān Āl Barmak). This was an era of comparative peace and prosperity, when even the entries in al-Tabari's chronicle are unusually brief due to the lack of noteworthy events.

As the representatives of the civil bureaucratic faction, the new Barmakid regime was characterized by the centralization of power in Baghdad: provincial governors lost in importance, especially as they were regularly changed after very brief tenures, in stark contrast to the long terms customary under al-Mansur. In the same manner, the central oversight of the fiscal administration of the provinces was tightened, with inspectors sent out to investigate allegations of abuses, and governors obliged to bring the revenue of their province and their accounts with them to the capital for auditing. In 794, Yahya patronized the building of a cathedral mosque in Bukhara.

Over the years, the tasks of governance devolved more and more to Yahya's sons, and in 798, he asked for leave to retire to Mecca, during one of the Caliph's pilgrimages there. This did not last long, as within a year he was back at his post in Baghdad.

=== Patronage of scholars ===
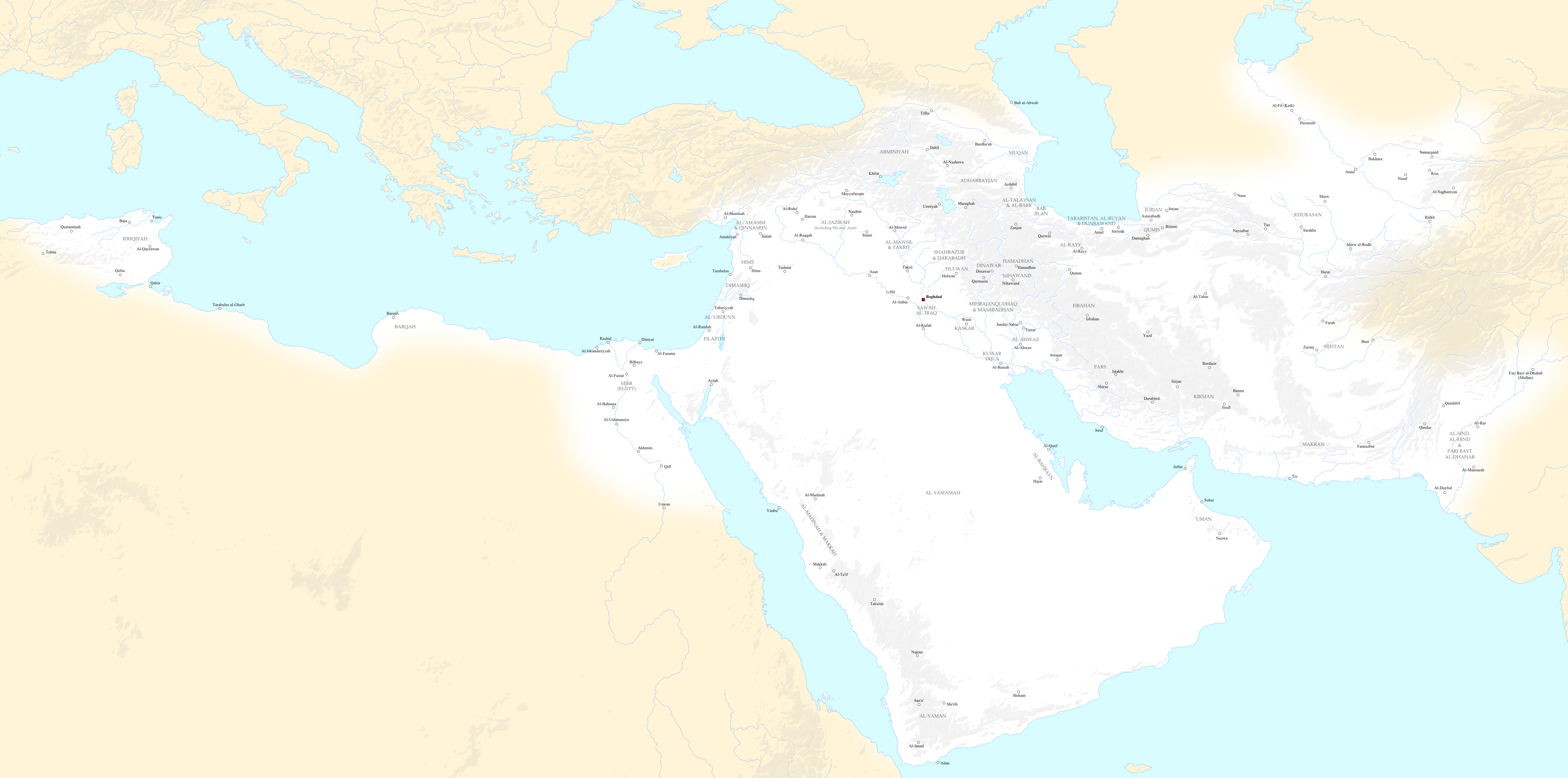
Map of the Abbasid Caliphate and its provinces in the late 8th century

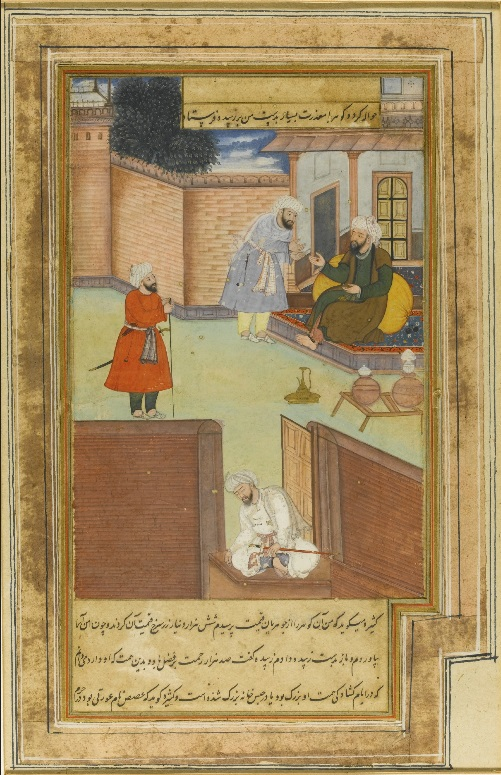
"Yahya Ibn Khalid al-Barmaki returning the jewel sent to him by Zubayda, the wife of Harun al-Rashid". An illustration from the Akhbar-i-Barmakiyan, created in Mughal India, dated c. 1595–1600

Yahya was distinguished for his patronage of scholars and poets, and especially for sponsoring a massive translation effort of Indian works from Sanskrit to Arabic. In terms of bringing knowledge to the Arabic world, Yahya's efforts were not matched until al-Biruni's Indica in the 11th century. Apart from the translations, Yahya also brought numerous Indian physicians to Baghdad, in a specially constructed hospital. He commissioned the poet Aban al-Lahiqi to put the stories of Kalīla wa-Dimna, Mazdak, and Bilawhar wa-Būdhāsaf into verse; the latter especially was likely translated from Sanskrit for the Barmakids as well. In the anecdotes relayed by the chroniclers, Yahya also appears "as the host of numerous learned sessions and discussions among diverse participants" (van Bladel), while Hugh Kennedy stresses that "the literary assemblies the Barmakids held were notable for the freedom with which unusual opin- ions were voiced".

== Downfall and death ==
The major weakness of the Barmakids' position was their lack of support among the military. The old military leadership was dismissed following Harun al-Rashid's accession, but the Barmakids' own attempts to recruit a power base among the soldiers failed, and their inability to suppress the Kharijite revolt of Walid ibn Tarif in 794—itself caused by the Barmakids' harsh fiscal measures—led the Caliph to turn to a representative of the old military elites, Yazid ibn Mazyad al-Shaybani, for help.

Following this, the old military establishment gradually returned to favour, and the Barmakids' monopoly on power was broken. From 796/7 on, the Barmakids found themselves challenged not only with a resurgent military elite, but also at the centre, where the Caliph dismissed Yahya's brother Muhammad and appointed instead as his chamberlain al-Fadl ibn al-Rabi, the son of Yahya's old ally, al-Rabi ibn Yunus. Al-Fadl ibn al-Rabi's access to the Caliph made him the centre of a rival court faction, and in the anecdotes of the time he appears both as the Barmakids' foil and their main antagonist at court. This change was not only the result of the Barmakids' own weakness, but apparently a conscious policy by Harun al-Rashid, who endeavoured to limit his dependency on the Barmakids. The Barmakids' more lenient attitudes towards the Alids, whom Harun continued to persecute, further widened the rift between the Caliph and the Barmakids, as seen in the protracted affair of Yahya ibn Abdallah.

In 803, his family fell into disgrace, and he was cast into prison, where he died in 806.

== Assessment ==
As the historian Hugh N. Kennedy writes, although Yahya was perhaps the dominant court figure of his time, "it is difficult to form a clear idea of [Yahya's] talents and achievements. Many of the stories about his life read more like exemplars written to show how a good minister and bureaucrat should behave and what he should accomplish, rather than as a historical record", the result of his idealization in the eyes of successive generations of Abbasid officials.

=== Family tree ===
Family tree of the Barmakids

Barmak
Khalid	Sulayman	al-Hasan
Yahya	Muhammad
Ja'far	al-Fadl	Muhammad	Musa
al-Abbas	Ja'far	Imran
Ahmad ("Jahza")

Source: Barthold, W. & Sourdel, D. (1960). "al-Barāmika". In Gibb, H. A. R.; Kramers, J. H.; Lévi-Provençal, E.; Schacht, J.; Lewis, B. & Pellat, Ch. (eds.). The Encyclopaedia of Islam, Second Edition. Volume I: A–B. Leiden: E. J. Brill. pp. 1033–1036. OCLC 495469456.

== Sources ==
- Abbas, I. (1988). "Barmakids". In Yarshater, Ehsan (ed.). Encyclopædia Iranica. Vol. III/8: Bardesanes–Bayhaqī, Ẓahīr-al-Dīn. London and New York: Routledge & Kegan Paul. pp. 806–809. ISBN 978-0-71009-120-8.
- Barthold, W. & Sourdel, D. (1960). "al-Barāmika". In Gibb, H. A. R.; Kramers, J. H.; Lévi-Provençal, E.; Schacht, J.; Lewis, B. & Pellat, Ch. (eds.). The Encyclopaedia of Islam, Second Edition. Volume I: A–B. Leiden: E. J. Brill. pp. 1033–1036. doi:10.1163/1573-3912_islam_COM_0099. OCLC 495469456.
- Bosworth, C. E., ed. (1989). The History of al-Ṭabarī, Volume XXX: The ʿAbbāsid Caliphate in Equilibrium: The Caliphates of Mūsā al-Hādī and Hārūn al-Rashīd, A.D. 785–809/A.H. 169–192. SUNY Series in Near Eastern Studies. Albany, New York: State University of New York Press. ISBN 978-0-88706-564-4.
- Crone, Patricia (1980). Slaves on Horses: The Evolution of the Islamic Polity (1980 ed.). Cambridge: Cambridge University Press. ISBN 978-0521229616.
- Kennedy, Hugh (2004) [1986]. The Prophet and the Age of the Caliphates: The Islamic Near East from the 6th to the 11th Century (Second ed.). Harlow: Longman. ISBN 978-0-582-40525-7.
- Kennedy, Hugh (2006). When Baghdad Ruled the Muslim World: The Rise and Fall of Islam's Greatest Dynasty. Cambridge, Massachusetts: Da Capo Press. ISBN 978-0-306814808.
- Minorsky, V. (1938). "Geographical Factors in Persian Art". Bulletin of the School of Oriental Studies, University of London. 9 (3): 621–652.
- van Bladel, Kevin (2012). "Barmakids". In Fleet, Kate; Krämer, Gudrun; Matringe, Denis; Nawas, John; Rowson, Everett (eds.). Encyclopaedia of Islam (3rd ed.). Brill Online. doi:10.1163/1573-3912_ei3_COM_24302. ISSN 1873-9830.
