= Ja'far ibn Yahya =

Vizier of Harun al-Rashid's Court (767–803)

Jaʽfar ibn Yahya جعفر بن يحيى
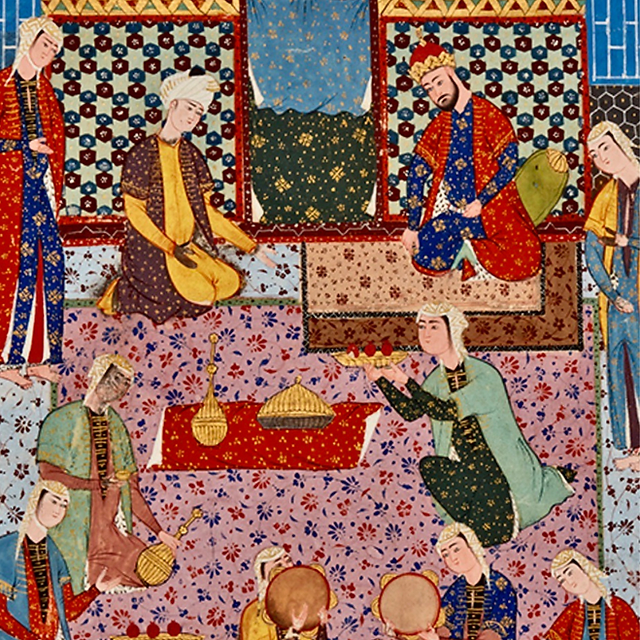
- Detail of a miniature illustrating an anecdote in which the power and influence of Jaʻfar ibn Yahya (crowned figure) is pointed out. Folio from a manuscript of Nigaristan, Iran, probably Shiraz, dated 1573–74
- Born: c. 767; Medina, Abbasid Caliphate
- Died: c. 803; Abbasid Caliphate
- Cause of death: Execution on the orders of Caliph Harun al-Rashid
- Other name: Aba-Fadl
- Occupation: Abbasid vizier
- Years active: c. 798 – 803
- Era: Abbasid
- Parents: Yahya ibn Khalid (father); Umm al-Fadl (mother)

Jaʽfar ibn Yahya Barmaki or Jafar al-Barmaki (Persian: جعفر بن یحیی برمکی, Arabic: جعفر بن يحيى, Jaʽfar bin yaḥyā) (767–803), also called Aba-Fadl, was a Bactrian vizier of the Abbasid caliph Harun al-Rashid, succeeding his father (Yahya ibn Khalid) in that position. He was a member of the influential Barmakid family, formerly Buddhist leaders of the Nava Vihara monastery. He was born in Medina in 767 and, executed in 803 at the orders of Harun al-Rashid.

He had a reputation as a patron of the sciences, and did much to introduce Indian science into Baghdad. He was credited with convincing the caliph to open a paper mill in Baghdad, the secret of papermaking having been obtained from Tang Chinese prisoners at the Battle of Talas (in present-day Kyrgyzstan) in 751.

== In fiction ==
Jaʽfar also appears (under the name of Giafar in most translations) along with Harun al-Rashid in several Arabian Nights tales, often acting as a protagonist. In "The Three Apples" for example, Jaʽfar is tasked with solving a murder, whereas in "The Tale of Attaf", Jaʽfar is more of an adventurer.

More recent media inspired by the Arabian Nights have portrayed Jaʽfar as both a villain and a sorcerer:

- In the 1940 version of The Thief of Bagdad, Conrad Veidt plays the grand vizier Jaffar, a sorcerer who overthrows the king and tries to seduce the princess.
- In the film The Golden Blade (1952), Harun al-Rashid (Rock Hudson) battles Jafar (George Macready), vizier to the caliph of Baghdad who tries to usurp the throne.
- In the book The Grand Vizier of the Night (1981) by Catherine Hermary-Vieille, he is the Caliph Harun al-Rashid's lover.
- The 1989 video game Prince of Persia features a scheming magician named Jaffar who seizes power from the Sultan and tries to force the Princess to marry him. In the later Prince of Persia games, an unnamed 'Vizier' is the main villain and is based on the Jaffar character from the original game.
- The 1992 Disney film Aladdin features an evil vizier and sorcerer called Jafar, who is a composite character of an (unnamed) vizier and an evil magician from the original Aladdin tale. He also appears in the 2019 live action adaptation.
- In the Japanese manga Magi: The Labyrinth of Magic, Jaʽfar is a young general working under Sinbad, the king of Sindria.
- In the Qatari historical series The Imam (2017), Jafar is portrayed by Muhannad Qutaisy.

== Family tree ==
Family tree of the Barmakids

Barmak
Khalid	Sulayman	al-Hasan
Yahya	Muhammad
Ja'far	al-Fadl	Muhammad	Musa
al-Abbas	Ja'far	Imran
Ahmad ("Jahza")

Source: Barthold, W. & Sourdel, D. (1960). "al-Barāmika". In Gibb, H. A. R.; Kramers, J. H.; Lévi-Provençal, E.; Schacht, J.; Lewis, B. & Pellat, Ch. (eds.). The Encyclopaedia of Islam, Second Edition. Volume I: A–B. Leiden: E. J. Brill. pp. 1033–1036. OCLC 495469456.

== See also ==
- Arib al-Ma'muniyya
