= Muhammad ibn Khalid ibn Barmak =

Chamberlain of Harun al-Rashid from Barmakid family

Chamberlain of the Abbasid caliph
- In office 788–795
- Monarch: Harun al-Rashid
- Succeeded by: Al-Fadl ibn al-Rabi

Personal details
- Cause of death: illness (natural)
- Parent: Khalid ibn Barmak (father)

Muhammad ibn Khalid ibn Barmak was one of the Barmakids, a family of Iranian functionaries who rose to great power under the Abbasid caliph Harun al-Rashid (r. 786–809).

== Life ==
He was the brother of Yahya ibn Khalid, whose appointment as vizier by Caliph Harun al-Rashid in 786 began the family's twenty-year domination of the Abbasid Caliphate's public affairs. Muhammad served as the Caliph's chamberlain (hajib) from 788 to 795. He was replaced by al-Fadl ibn al-Rabi, who in the anecdotes of the time appears both as the Barmakids' foil and main antagonist at court.

Muhammad also served Harun al-Rashid as governor in the Yemen and the Jazira.

He was the only Barmakid to be spared during the family's abrupt fall in 803, likely because he had reported on the attempted flight of the Alid Yahya ibn Abdallah, who had been released by Yahya's son Ja'far, contrary to the Caliph's orders to have him killed.

== Family tree ==
Family tree of the Barmakids

Barmak
Khalid	Sulayman	al-Hasan
Yahya	Muhammad
Ja'far	al-Fadl	Muhammad	Musa
al-Abbas	Ja'far	Imran
Ahmad ("Jahza")

Source: Barthold, W. & Sourdel, D. (1960). "al-Barāmika". In Gibb, H. A. R.; Kramers, J. H.; Lévi-Provençal, E.; Schacht, J.; Lewis, B. & Pellat, Ch. (eds.). The Encyclopaedia of Islam, Second Edition. Volume I: A–B. Leiden: E. J. Brill. pp. 1033–1036. OCLC 495469456.

== Sources ==
- Barthold, W. & Sourdel, D. (1960). "al-Barāmika". In Gibb, H. A. R.; Kramers, J. H.; Lévi-Provençal, E.; Schacht, J.; Lewis, B. & Pellat, Ch. (eds.). The Encyclopaedia of Islam, Second Edition. Volume I: A–B. Leiden: E. J. Brill. pp. 1033–1036. doi:10.1163/1573-3912_islam_COM_0099. OCLC 495469456.
- Bosworth, C. E., ed. (1989). The History of al-Ṭabarī, Volume XXX: The ʿAbbāsid Caliphate in Equilibrium: The Caliphates of Mūsā al-Hādī and Hārūn al-Rashīd, A.D. 785–809/A.H. 169–192. SUNY Series in Near Eastern Studies. Albany, New York: State University of New York Press. ISBN 978-0-88706-564-4.
- Crone, Patricia (1980). Slaves on Horses: The Evolution of the Islamic Polity (1980 ed.). Cambridge: Cambridge University Press. ISBN 978-0521229616.
- Kennedy, Hugh (2006). When Baghdad Ruled the Muslim World: The Rise and Fall of Islam's Greatest Dynasty. Cambridge, Massachusetts: Da Capo Press. ISBN 978-0-306814808.
- Madelung, W. (2002). "Yaḥyā b. ʿAbd Allāh". In Bearman, P. J.; Bianquis, Th.; Bosworth, C. E.; van Donzel, E. & Heinrichs, W. P. (eds.). The Encyclopaedia of Islam, Second Edition. Volume XI: W–Z. Leiden: E. J. Brill. pp. 242–243. doi:10.1163/1573-3912_islam_SIM_7947. ISBN 978-90-04-12756-2.
- van Bladel, Kevin (2012). "Barmakids". In Fleet, Kate; Krämer, Gudrun; Matringe, Denis; Nawas, John; Rowson, Everett (eds.). Encyclopaedia of Islam (3rd ed.). Brill Online. doi:10.1163/1573-3912_ei3_COM_24302. ISSN 1873-9830.
