= Musa ibn Yahya =

Abbasid provincial governor and official (died c.835)

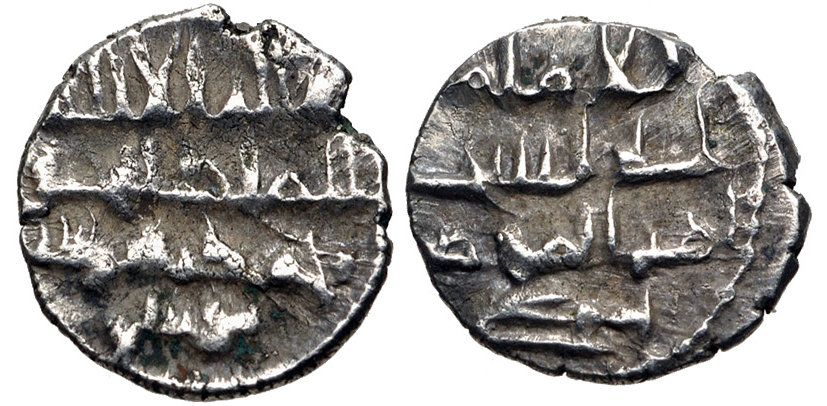
- Coinage of Musa ibn Yahya al-Barmaki as governor of Sindh (c. AH 218–221 (833–836 CE)

Abbasid governor of Syria
- In office 792 – 792 (less than a year)
- Monarch: Harun al-Rashid
- Preceded by: Musa ibn Isa ibn Musa al-Hashimi
- Succeeded by: Abd al-Malik ibn Salih

Abbasid governor of Sindh
- In office 831–835
- Monarchs: Al-Ma'mun; Al-Mu'tasim
- Preceded by: Ghassan ibn Abbad
- Succeeded by: Imran ibn Musa ibn Yahya

Personal details
- Born: Abbasid Caliphate
- Died: c. 835 Sind, Abbasid Caliphate (now Sindh province of Pakistan)
- Children: Imran (son)
- Parent: Yahya ibn Khalid (father)

Musa ibn Yahya (Arabic: موسى بن يحيى, romanized: Mūsā ibn Yaḥyā) was a member of the powerful Barmakid family in the service of the Abbasid Caliphate.

== Life ==
Musa was a son of Yahya ibn Khalid. He was not as prominent as his brothers Ja'far and al-Fadl, but was well known for his bravery in battle. He served as governor of Syria in 792, to suppress the Qays–Yaman conflict in the province. In 802, he was denounced to Caliph Harun al-Rashid by the governor of Khurasan, Ali ibn Isa ibn Mahan, as planning to raise the province in revolt against the Caliph. According to a report relayed by al-Tabari, at the same time Musa had to go into hiding from his debtors, so the Caliph became suspicious that he was about to secretly go to Khurasan; when Musa appeared before the Caliph, he had him arrested, and released only after his father vouchsafed for him.

When the Barmakids were deposed and arrested by Caliph Harun al-Rashid in 803, Musa too was imprisoned with his father and brothers until the accession of al-Amin, who released them and showed them again some favour. During the Fourth Fitna, Musa sided with al-Amin, fighting in the ranks of the loyalist army against al-Ma'mun, but he later entered the latter's service. Al-Ma'mun appointed him as governor of Sindh. Musa died in office in 835, and was succeeded by his son, Imran.

A grandson of Musa, Ahmad ibn Ja'far, surnamed Jahza, was one of the closest companions of the 10th century Caliph al-Muqtadir (r. 908–932).

== Family tree ==
Family tree of the Barmakids

Barmak
Khalid	Sulayman	al-Hasan
Yahya	Muhammad
Ja'far	al-Fadl	Muhammad	Musa
al-Abbas	Ja'far	Imran
Ahmad ("Jahza")

Source: Barthold, W. & Sourdel, D. (1960). "al-Barāmika". In Gibb, H. A. R.; Kramers, J. H.; Lévi-Provençal, E.; Schacht, J.; Lewis, B. & Pellat, Ch. (eds.). The Encyclopaedia of Islam, Second Edition. Volume I: A–B. Leiden: E. J. Brill. pp. 1033–1036. OCLC 495469456.

== Sources ==
- Barthold, W. & Sourdel, D. (1960). "al-Barāmika". In Gibb, H. A. R.; Kramers, J. H.; Lévi-Provençal, E.; Schacht, J.; Lewis, B. & Pellat, Ch. (eds.). The Encyclopaedia of Islam, Second Edition. Volume I: A–B. Leiden: E. J. Brill. pp. 1033–1036. doi:10.1163/1573-3912_islam_COM_0099. OCLC 495469456.
- Bosworth, C. E., ed. (1989). The History of al-Ṭabarī, Volume XXX: The ʿAbbāsid Caliphate in Equilibrium: The Caliphates of Mūsā al-Hādī and Hārūn al-Rashīd, A.D. 785–809/A.H. 169–192. SUNY Series in Near Eastern Studies. Albany, New York: State University of New York Press. ISBN 978-0-88706-564-4.
- Crone, Patricia (1980). Slaves on Horses: The Evolution of the Islamic Polity (1980 ed.). Cambridge: Cambridge University Press. ISBN 978-0521229616.
