= Al-Fadl ibn Yahya =

Abbasid provincial governor (766–808)

Abbasid governor of Arminiyah
- In office 791–793
- Monarch: Harun al-Rashid
- Preceded by: Abd al-Qadir (791–791)
- Succeeded by: Umar ibn Ayyub al-Kinani (793–793)

Abbasid governor of Tabaristan and Ray
- In office 792–797
- Monarch: Harun al-Rashid

Abbasid governor of Khorasan
- In office 794/5–795/6
- Monarch: Harun al-Rashid

Personal details
- Born: February 766 Abbasid Caliphate
- Died: October/November 808 Abbasid prison of Raqqa, Raqqa, Abbasid Caliphate, (now Syria)
- Cause of death: Died in Prison of Raqqa
- Parents: Yahya ibn Khalid (father); Umm al-Fadl (mother)

Al-Fadl ibn Yahya al-Barmaki (Arabic: الفضل البرمكي) (February 766 – October/November 808) was a member of the distinguished Barmakid family, attaining high offices in the Abbasid Caliphate under Harun al-Rashid (r. 786–809).

He was the most generous from his family. He was the wazir to Harun al-Rashid. Al Fadl ibn Yahya and Harun al-Rashid were milk-brothers (foster brothers). Al-Fadl was responsible for looking over Khurasan. He was accused for spending his time hunting and enjoyment and did not fulffill the responsibility of taking care of the affairs of the people. His own father, was sitting in the presence of Harun al-Rashid for business and was asked to write a letter to his son addressing him as “my dear son”. After al-Fadl received the letter he remained in the mosque for all of his days until his responsibility had ended. There was a fire temple in the city of Balk where his ancestor was the servant or priest. He destroyed a portion of it and constructed it as a mosque. In the year 176, Al-Fadl was now made responsible for the administration of the eastern provinces from Sharwan to the furthest part of the Turks.

Fadl was the eldest son of Yahya al-Barmaki, the founder of the family's fortunes. During the caliphate of Harun al-Rashid, he served as tutor to his heir, the future Caliph al-Amin (r. 809–813), and held gubernatorial positions over Tabaristan and Rayy (792–797), and over Khurasan (794/5–795/6). In these positions, he distinguished himself "by the benevolence he showed towards the inhabitants of the eastern provinces" (D. Sourdel). As governor of Khorasan, Fadl built the "Gate of Iron", between Termez and Rāsht, to stop raids by Turks.

Fadl fell out with Harun over his attempts to conciliate the Alids, however, and shared in his family's sudden fall from power in 803. He remained imprisoned thereafter and died at Raqqa in 808.

== Family tree ==
Family tree of the Barmakids

Barmak
Khalid	Sulayman	al-Hasan
Yahya	Muhammad
Ja'far	al-Fadl	Muhammad	Musa
al-Abbas	Ja'far	Imran
Ahmad ("Jahza")

Source: Barthold, W. & Sourdel, D. (1960). "al-Barāmika". In Gibb, H. A. R.; Kramers, J. H.; Lévi-Provençal, E.; Schacht, J.; Lewis, B. & Pellat, Ch. (eds.). The Encyclopaedia of Islam, Second Edition. Volume I: A–B. Leiden: E. J. Brill. pp. 1033–1036. OCLC 495469456.

== Sources ==
- Ibn Khallikan, Ahmad ibn Muhammad. Wafayat al-a‘yan wa-anba’ abna’ al-zaman. Vol. 4, pp. 7–18. India: Kitab Bhavan, 1996.
- Haug, Robert (2019). The Eastern Frontier: Limits of Empire in Late Antique and Early Medieval Central Asia. I.B. Tauris. ISBN 978-0-7556-3852-9.
- Sourdel, Dominique (1965). "al-Faḍl b. Yaḥyā al-Barmakī". In Lewis, B.; Pellat, Ch. & Schacht, J. (eds.). The Encyclopaedia of Islam, Second Edition. Volume II: C–G. Leiden: E. J. Brill. p. 732. OCLC 495469475.
- Zetterstéen, K.V. (1987). "Al-Faḍl b. Yaḥyā". E.J. Brill's First Encyclopaedia of Islam, Volume III: E–I′timād al-Dawla. Leiden: BRILL. p. 37. ISBN 90-04-09789-9.
