= Barmakids =

Influential Iranian family of Harun al-Rashid era

Barmakids برمکیان
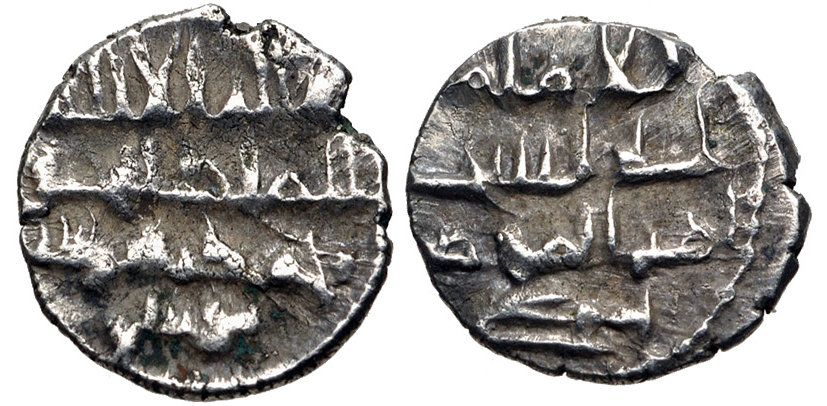
- Current region: Balkh, Khorasan, Abbasid Caliphate
- Titles: Vizier, Governor
- Traditions: Buddhism (originally), Islam (later)
- Dissolution: Declined during Harun al-Rashid's reign

The Barmakids (Persian: برمکیان Barmakiyân; Arabic: البرامكة al-Barāmikah), also spelled Barmecides, were an influential Iranian family from Balkh, where they were originally hereditary Buddhist leaders (in the Nawbahar monastery), (Note: Due to the recent clarifications of van Bladel, we now know that the frequent references in older literature to the Barmakids being Persian or Zoroastrian are imprecise. See, e.g., "Barmakids." Encyclopædia Britannica. 2007. Encyclopædia Britannica Online. 4 June 2007, Cyril Glassé (ed.), The New Encyclopedia of Islam, Lanham, MD: Rowman & Littlefield Publishers, revised ed., 2003, ISBN 0-7591-0190-6, Excerpt from: pg 6: "The 'Abbasid dynasty ruled with the help of the Barmakids, a prominent Persian family from Balkh who, before their conversion, had been priests in the Buddhist monastery of Nawbahar." Josef W. Meri, Jere L. Bacharach, "Medieval Islamic Civilization: L-Z, index", Taylor & Francis, 2006. pg 855: "The Barmakids, a Persian family who had converted to Islam from Buddhism." Liyakatali Takim, "The heirs of the prophet: charisma and religious authority in Shi'ite Islam ", SUNY Press, 2006. pg 51: "The Barmakids were a Persian family of secretaries and wazirs who served the early 'Abbassid caliphs in different administrative capacities.") and subsequently came to great political power under the Abbasid caliphs of Baghdad. Khalid, the son of Barmak became the chief minister (vizier) of al-Saffah (r. 750–754), the first caliph of the Abbasid dynasty. His son Yahya aided Harun al-Rashid in capturing the throne and rose to power as the most powerful man in the Caliphate.

The Barmakids were remarkable for their majesty, splendor and hospitality. They are mentioned in some stories of the One Thousand and One Nights.

== Origins ==
The family is traceable back to the hereditary Buddhist administrators of the Buddhist monastery of Nava Vihāra (Nawbahar) west of Balkh in northern Afghanistan. William Dalrymple described them as the "hereditary rulers of the Balkh oasis". They also intermarried with other ruling families of the upper Amu Darya. Historians of Islam have sometimes considered the Barmakids to have been Zoroastrian priests before converting to Islam, an erroneous view based on the fact that Balkh was known as an important centre of Zoroastrianism, or from a simple failure of early Islamic sources to distinguish Zoroastrians from Buddhists. In fact, the Barmakids descended from the chiefs, or administrators of the Buddhist monastery called Navavihāra (from Sanskrit, lit. 'New Monastery') that was described by the Chinese Buddhist diarist Xuanzang in the seventh century, which may have led to the Persian and Arabic writers to erroneously believe that the term Nowbahār was the name of a Zoroastrian fire temple headed by the Barmakids, as reported in Islamic sources. Harold Bailey gave the derivation of the name Barmak from Sanskrit Pramukha, lit. 'leader' or 'chief', although the exact significance and role of the office is uncertain. Historian Roxann Prazniak suggests the Barmakids to be possibly of Kashmiri descent.

The Barmakids converted to Islam after the Arab invasion of the Sasanian Empire. They were highly educated, respected and influential throughout Arabia, Persia, Central Asia and the Levant. In Baghdad, the Barmakid court became a centre of patronage for the ulema, poets, scholars alike.

The first member of the family whose identity is known in historical records was a physician of Balkh. He is reputed for a pill named after him and also recommended by Ibn Sina in addition to a scent which was widely used by prostitutes. According to al-Masudi, the name Barmak was not a name but a title of the high priest of the fire temple of the city, though recent research makes it certain that it was a Buddhist title changed to look more Iranian. His wife was enslaved during the battle for Balkh in 705 and given to the Arab general's brother 'Abd-Ullah. Their sexual relation produced a son known as Khalid, whom 'Abd-Ullah later acknowledged as his natural son. She was later restored to her husband after peace was reached. Although, Tabari casts doubt on this story and believes it may have been fabricated by the descendants of 'Abd-Ullah to attach themselves to the Barmakid lineage. Barmak had also been summoned to cure Caliph Abd al-Malik's son Maslama in 705. Abu Hafs 'Umar al-Kirmani's account narrates that the Barmak was brought among a party of shakirriya (thought to be slaves or retainers) and honored by the Caliph Hisham ibn Abd al-Malik who increased his status and was impressed by him. He then became a Muslim and enjoyed a high status. Clifford Edmund Bosworth states that it isn't known when or where the Barmak died, nor is his conversion certain, despite al-Kirmani's account. al-Kirmani states that he may have retained his faith as his son Khalid's beliefs were suspect, according to Ibn 'Asakir. Ibn al-Faqih records that his father had to abandon Islam after converting due to pressure from local magnates as well as people of Tukharistan and was even attacked by Tarkhan Nizak, being killed along with his ten sons. Khalid was born a Buddhist and later converted to Islam, taking various ministerial jobs within the Abbasid Caliphate. The Buddhist ancestry of Barmakids seems to have stimulated interest in Indian sciences in the eighth century.

=== Khalid al-Barmaki ===
Khalid al-Barmaki (705–782) occupied distinguished positions under first two Abbasid Caliphs, al-Saffah (722–754) and al-Mansur (714–775). He had risen to be the vizier, following death of Abu Salma and Abul Jahm. Khalid was on such intimate terms with al-Saffah that his daughter was nursed by the wife of the Caliph. Likewise, Caliph's daughter was nursed by Khalid's wife.

Under Abbasid regime Khalid rose to the headship of the department of Finance (diwan al-Kharaj) This department was concerned with Taxation and Land Tenure. Genuine budgets began to be drawn up for the first time and offices sprang up for various departments. The extensive staff of officials engaged in correspondence with the provinces and prepared estimates and accounts. An influential stratum of officialdom, the Irano-Islamic class of secretaries (kuttab in Arabic, dabiran in Persian), was formed which considered itself as the main support of the state. Their knowledge of the complex system of the kharaj (land tax) which took account not only of the quality of the land but of the produce of the crops sown, made the officials of the diwan al-Kharaj; the guardians of knowledge which was inaccessible to the uninitiated and was passed by inheritance.

In 765, Khalid al-Barmaki received the governorship of Tabaristan, where he crushed a dangerous uprising. During his governorship of Upper Mesopotamia, Khalid, through a mix of firmness and justice, brought the province quickly into order and effectively curbed the unruly Kurds.

=== Yahya ibn Khalid ===
Khalid's son, Yahya ibn Khalid (d. 190 AH / 806), at one time Governor of Arminiya, was entrusted by Caliph al-Mahdi (r. 158–169 AH / 775–85) with the education of his son, Harun, the future Caliph al-Rashid.

=== al-Fadl and Ja'far ===
Yaḥya's sons al-Fadl (150–192 AH / 766–808) and Ja'far (151–187 AH / 767–803), both occupied high offices under Harun al-Rashid.

== Influence under the early Abbasids ==
The Barmakid family was an early supporter of the Abbasid revolt against the Umayyads and of As-Saffah. This gave Khalid bin Barmak considerable influence, and his son Yahya ibn Khalid (d. 190 AH / 806) was the vizier of the caliph al-Mahdi (ruled 158–169 AH / 775–785) and tutor of Harun al-Rashid (ruled 170–193 AH / 786–809). Yahya's sons al-Fadl and Ja'far (151–187 AH / 767–803), both occupied high offices under Harun.

Many Barmakids were among many patrons of the sciences, which greatly helped the propagation of Iranian science and scholarship into the Islamic world of Baghdad and beyond. They patronized scholars such as Gebir and Jabril ibn Bukhtishu. The Barmakids translated Sanskrit astronomy, medicine, and mathematics into Arabic. They are also credited with the establishment of the first paper mill in Baghdad. The power of the Barmakids in those times is reflected in The Book of One Thousand and One Nights; the vizier Ja'far appears in several stories, as well as a tale that gave rise to the expression "Barmecide feast".

"We know of Yahya ibn Khalid al-Barmaki (d. 189 AH / 805) as a patron of physicians and, specifically, of the translation of Hindu medical works into both Arabic and Persian. In all likelihood however, his activity took place in the orbit of the caliphal court in Iraq, where at the behest of Hārūn al-Rashīd (170–193 AH / 786–809), such books were translated into Arabic. Thus Khurāsān and Transoxiana were effectively bypassed in this transfer of learning from India to Islam, even though, undeniably the Barmakī's cultural outlook owed something to their land of origin, northern khurasan, and Yahya al-Barmakī's interest in medicine may have derived from no longer identifiable family tradition."

== Loss of support at the Abbasid court and execution of Jafar ==
In 803, the family lost favor in the eyes of Harun al-Rashīd, and many of its members were imprisoned. The decision came as sudden to many. However, Harun al-Rashid is also reported to have given orders to his sahib-al-shurta al-Sindi ibn Shahak of confiscation of Barmakid properties one year before the events, implying it to be planned action.

According to Rit Nosotro, Harun al-Rashīd found his chief pleasure in the society of his sister ʿAbbāsa and Barmakid prince Jafar bin Yahya. In order that these two might be with him continuously without breach of the restrictions on women, he persuaded them to contract a purely formal marriage. This marriage was on condition the two would meet only in his presence, and never produce an heir. This condition was broken, and when Harun learned that ʿAbbāsa had borne a son, he had Jafar suddenly arrested and beheaded, and the rest of the family, except Yahya's brother Muḥammad, also imprisoned and deprived of their property. However, these claims lack credibility as they are unconvincing legends, fake stories and fiction that has no basis whatsoever. In reality, after the death of Abbasa's first husband Muhammad ibn Sulayman ibn Ali, her brother Harun Al-Rashid arranged the marriage of his sister to Ibrahim ibn Salih.

Al-Tabari and Ibn Khaldūn mentioned completely other different reasons ensuring that their decline was gradual and not sudden. These other reasons are:

- The Barmakids' monetary extravagance, so that in displays of wealth they overshadowed Hārun himself. It has been said that Yahya ibn Khalid had gold tiles on the wall of his mansion, and Jafar ibn Yahya's mansion cost twenty million dirhams. Hārun became upset on a tour of Baghdad: whenever he saw an impressive house or mansion, he was told it belonged to the Barmakids.
- The hostility of al-Fadl ibn al-Rabi', an official very close to Hārun. He persuaded Hārūn to assign spies to watch them, and that is how Hārūn found out about the escape of Yahya ibn Abdullah al-Talibi.
- The Yahya ibn Abdullah al-Talibi incident. In AH 176, Yahya ibn Abdullah went to Daylam in Persia and called for rule by himself in place of Hārūn. Many people followed him, and he became strong enough to threaten Hārūn. Hārūn captured him, and placed him in house arrest in the custody of Barmakid al-Fadl ibn Yahya. However, al-Fadl ibn Yahya instead connived at Yahya ibn Abdullah's escape from Baghdad. The Caliph considered that to be high treason.
- The Barmakid army. Although technically this army of 50,000 men was under the Caliph, in reality, it was controlled by al-Fadl ibn Yahya. During the last days of Barmakid power, al-Fadl brought 20,000 men to Baghdad as the Karnabiya Legion. This made Harun very wary of their intentions.
- The Governor of Khurasan at the time, Ali ibn Isa ibn Mahan, sent a letter to Hārun reporting unrest in his province, which he blamed on Musa ibn Yahya, another brother of Jafar.

The fall of the Iranian Barmakids did not, however, affect the prominent position of the Persians in the Abbasid court, which continued until al-Mutawakkil.

Felicia Hemans reflects on the suppression by Hārun even of their name in her poem The Mourner for the Barmecides, published in 1826.

== Legacy ==
A number of canals, mosques and other public works owe their existence to the initiative and munificence of the Barmakids. Al Fadl ibn Yahya is credited with introducing the use of lamps in the mosques during the holy month of Ramadan. They are also credited with the establishment of the first paper mill in Baghdad. Jafar ibn Yahya acquired great fame for eloquence, literary activity, and calligraphy. Hitti argues that chiefly because of him, Arab historians regard the Barmakids as the founders of the class designated as 'people of the pen' (ahl al-qalam). The long neck which Barmakids possessed is said to have been responsible for the introduction of the custom of wearing high collars. The first extant Arabic report on India was prepared under the directions of Yahya ibn Barmak by his envoy. The Barmakids invited several scholars and physicians from everywhere in the caliphate to the court of Abbasids. During the Caliphate campaigns in India, Khalid ibn Barmak built the city of Mansura (Brahmanabad) there. Khalid was later in charge of the building of Baghdad. On 30 July 763, the caliph Al Mansur concluded the construction of the city.

Baramkeh, which is named after the Barmakids, is a neighborhood and district in the Qanawat municipality of Damascus.

== Family tree ==
Family tree of the Barmakids

Barmak
Khalid	Sulayman	al-Hasan
Yahya	Muhammad
Ja'far	al-Fadl	Muhammad	Musa
al-Abbas	Ja'far	Imran
Ahmad ("Jahza")

Source: Barthold, W. & Sourdel, D. (1960). "al-Barāmika". In Gibb, H. A. R.; Kramers, J. H.; Lévi-Provençal, E.; Schacht, J.; Lewis, B. & Pellat, Ch. (eds.). The Encyclopaedia of Islam, Second Edition. Volume I: A–B. Leiden: E. J. Brill. pp. 1033–1036. OCLC 495469456.

== Sources ==
- Abbas, I. (1988). "Barmakids". Encyclopaedia Iranica, Vol. III, Fasc. 8. New York. pp. 806–809.
- Barthold, W. & Sourdel, D. (1960). "al-Barāmika". In Gibb, H. A. R.; Kramers, J. H.; Lévi-Provençal, E.; Schacht, J.; Lewis, B. & Pellat, Ch. (eds.). The Encyclopaedia of Islam, Second Edition. Volume I: A–B. Leiden: E. J. Brill. pp. 1033–1036. OCLC 495469456.
- Biran, Michal (2024). "Islamic Expansion into Central Asia and Muslim-Buddhist Encounters". In Meinert, Carmen; Sørensen, Henrik H.; Doney, Lewis; Kasai, Yukiyo (eds.). Buddhism in Central Asia III: Impacts of Non-Buddhist Influences, Doctrines. Brill. pp. 13–64. ISBN 9789004687288.
- Gil, Moshe (1997) [1983]. A History of Palestine, 634–1099. Translated by Ethel Broido. Cambridge: Cambridge University Press. ISBN 0-521-59984-9.
- Ibn Qutaybah, Abu Muhammad Abdallah ibn Muslim (n.d.). Ukashah, Tharwat (ed.). Al-Ma'arif (in Arabic) (4th ed.). Cairo: al-Dar Ma'arif.
- Kennedy, Hugh, ed. (1990). The History of al-Ṭabarī, Volume XXIX: Al-Mansūr and al-Mahdī, A.D. 763–786/A.H. 146–169. SUNY Series in Near Eastern Studies. Albany, New York: State University of New York Press. ISBN 978-0-7914-0142-2.
- Mottahedeh, Roy (1975). "The ʿAbbāsid Caliphate in Iran". In Frye, Richard N. (ed.). The Cambridge History of Iran: From the Arab Invasion to the Saljuqs. Vol. 4. Cambridge: Cambridge University Press. pp. 57–90. ISBN 0-521-20093-8.
- Sajjadi, Sadeq; Gholami, Rahim (2013). "Barmakids". In Madelung, Wilferd; Daftary, Farhad (eds.). Encyclopaedia Islamica Online. Brill Online. ISSN 1875-9831.
- van Bladel, Kevin (2011). "The Bactrian Background of the Barmakids". In Akasoy, A.; Burnett, C.; Yoeli-Tlalim, R. (eds.). Islam and Tibet: Interactions along the Musk Routes. London: Ashgate. pp. 43–88.
- van Bladel, Kevin (2012). "Barmakids". In Fleet, Kate; Krämer, Gudrun; Matringe, Denis; Nawas, John; Rowson, Everett (eds.). Encyclopaedia of Islam (3rd ed.). Brill Online. ISSN 1873-9830.
