= Bazirgan =

Turkish word for "merchant"

Bazirgan and Bezirgan are the Turkish forms of the Persian Bāzargān, meaning "merchant". In Ottoman Turkish, the term Bāzirgān was used to denote merchants of Christian and especially Jewish origin. Some of these Christian and Jewish merchants held office in the Ottoman palace or Ottoman army. For instance, the Bazirgan-bashi functioned as a chief purveyor of textiles to the Imperial Ottoman household. The Odjak-Bāzirgāni, in practice a steward, was usually of Greek or Jewish origins, and was responsible for handling the salaries and supplies of the Janissary corps. The office of Odjak-Bāzirgāni became a hereditary post amongst certain families.

== Sources ==
- Lewis, Bernard (1960). "Bazi̊rgan". In Gibb, H. A. R.; Kramers, J. H.; Lévi-Provençal, E.; Schacht, J.; Lewis, B. & Pellat, Ch. (eds.). The Encyclopaedia of Islam, Second Edition. Volume I: A–B. Leiden: E. J. Brill. OCLC 495469456.
