= Aban al-Lahiqi =

Iraqi poet

- ابان لاحقی
- Born: c. 750; Basra, Abbasid Caliphate
- Died: 815 or 816
- Occupation: Poet
- Writing career
- Language: Arabic
- Period: Abbasid era
- Genre: Poetry
- Notable works: Versified popular stories of Indian and Persian origin

Aban b. 'Abd al-Hamid al-Lahiqi (al-Raqashi) (Persian: ابان لاحقی) of Basra (c. 750–815 or 816) was a Persian court poet of the Barmakids in Baghdad. He set into Arabic verse popular stories of Indian and Persian origin. He was suspected of Manichaeism.
