= Anna Akasoy =

German orientalist and professor

Anna Ayșe Akasoy is a German orientalist and professor of Islamic intellectual history at the Graduate Center, CUNY. Akasoy works on the intellectual history of Islam, especially of al-Andalus, on Islamic philosophy as well as on Arab veterinary medicine, falconry and hunting.

== Career ==
Akasoy studied oriental studies, history and philosophy at the Goethe University Frankfurt in Germany, where she received her doctorate in oriental studies in 2005. Until 2008 she worked as a research assistant at the Warburg Institute, London, on the project Islam and Tibet: Cultural Interactions, 8th-17th Centuries. This was followed by positions as a lecturer and research assistant at the Oriental Faculty of the University of Oxford and as associate professor at Hunter College in New York City. As of 2024, Akasoy is professor of Islamic intellectual history at the Graduate Center, CUNY.

== Books ==
Akasoy's books include:

- The Arabic Version of the Nicomachean Ethics (edited with Alexander Fidora, Brill, 2005)
- Das Falken- und Hundebuch des Kalifen al-Mutawakkil: Ein arabischer Traktat aus dem 9 Jahrhundert (edited and translated with Stefan Georges, Akademie, 2005)
- Philosophie und Mystik in der späten Almohadenzeit, die sizilianischen Fragen des Ibn Sab'īn (Brill, 2006)
- Islamic Crosspollinations: Interactions in the Medieval Middle East (edited with James E. Montgomery and Peter E. Pormann, The E. J. W. Gibb Memorial Trust, 2007)
- Astro-Medicine: Astrology and Medicine, East and West (edited with Charles Burnett and Ronit Yoeli-Tlalim, Sismel–Edizioni del Galluzzo, 2008)
- Islam and Tibet: Interactions along the Musk Routes (edited with Charles Burnett and Ronit Yoeli-Tlalim, Ashgate, 2010)
- Rashīd al-Dīn: Agent and Mediator of Cultural Exchanges in Ilkhanid Iran (edited with Charles Burnett and Ronit Yoeli-Tlalim, The Warburg Institute, 2013)
- Renaissance Averroism and Its Aftermath: Arabic Philosophy in Early Modern Europe (edited with Guido Giglioni, Springer, 2013)
