= Harun al-Rashid =

5th Abbasid caliph (r. 786–809)

Harun al-Rashid هارون الرشيد
- Amir al-Mu'minin
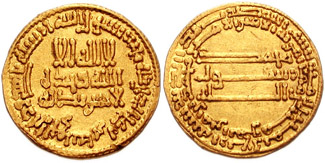
- Gold dinar of Harun al-Rashid, (184 AH) 800 CE

5th Caliph of the Abbasid Caliphate
- Reign: 14 September 786 – 24 March 809
- Predecessor: Al-Hadi
- Successor: Al-Amin
- Born: 17 March 763 or February 766; Ray, Jibal, Abbasid Caliphate
- Died: 24 March 809 (aged 43 or 46); Tus, Khorasan, Abbasid Caliphate
- Burial: Tomb of Harun al-Rashid in Imam Reza Mosque, Mashhad, Iran
- Consorts: List: Zubaidah bint Ja'far; Azizah bint Ghitrif; Ghadir; Umm Muhammad bint Salih; Abbasa bint Sulayman; Jurashiyyah al-Uthmanniyah; Hailanah; Dananir; Marajil; Qasif; Maridah bint Shabib; Dhat al-Khal; Sihr; Diya; Inan bint Abdallah; Ghadid; Shikl; Shadhr; Hilanah; Ri'm; Sahdhrah; Rawah; Dawaj; Kitman; Hulab; Irabah; Rahiq; Khzq; Haly; Aniq; Samandal; Zinah; Qaina; Shajw
- Issue: Al-Amin (Note: First heir-apparent); Al-Ma'mun (Note: Second heir-apparent); Al-Qasim (Note: Al-Qasim was the third heir, however, he was removed by his elder brothers); Al-Mu'tasim (Note: Al-Ma'mun had made no official provisions for his succession during his reign. According to the account of al-Tabari, on his deathbed al-Ma'mun dictated a letter nominating his brother Abu Ishaq Muhammad as his successor, He was acclaimed as caliph on 9 August, with the regnal title of al-Mu'tasim bi'llah); Abdan; Sukaynah; See more below
- Dynasty: Abbasid
- Father: Al-Mahdi
- Mother: Al-Khayzuran
- Religion: Sunni Islam

Abū Jaʿfar Hārūn ibn Muḥammad ar-Rashīd, (Note: Arabic: أَبُو جَعْفَر هَارُون ٱبْنِ مُحَمَّد ٱلْمَهْدِيّ, romanized: Abū Ja'far Hārūn ibn Muḥammad al-Mahdī) (c. 763 or 766 – 24 March 809), famously known as Hārūn al-Rashīd, (Note: Arabic: هَارُون ٱلرَّشِيد, romanized: Hārūn ar-Rashīd) was the fifth of the Abbasid caliphs, reigning from September 786 until his death in March 809. His reign is traditionally regarded to be the beginning of the Islamic Golden Age. His epithet al-Rashid translates to "the Upright", or "the Rightly-Guided".

Harun established the legendary library Bayt al-Hikma ("House of Wisdom") in Baghdad in present-day Iraq, and during his rule Baghdad began to flourish as a world center of knowledge, culture and trade. During his rule, the family of Barmakids, which played a deciding role in establishing the Abbasid Caliphate, declined gradually. In 796, he moved his court and government to Raqqa in present-day Syria. Domestically, Harun pursued policies similar to those of his father Al-Mahdi. He released many of the Umayyads and Alids his brother Al-Hadi had imprisoned and declared amnesty for all political groups of the Quraysh. Large scale hostilities broke out with Byzantium, and under his rule, the Abbasid Empire reached its peak.

A Frankish mission came to offer Harun friendship in 799. Harun sent various presents with the emissaries on their return to Charlemagne's court, including a clock that Charlemagne and his retinue deemed to be a conjuration because of the sounds it emanated and the tricks it displayed every time an hour ticked. Portions of the fictional One Thousand and One Nights are set in Harun's court and some of its stories involve Harun himself. Harun's life and court have been the subject of many other tales, both factual and fictitious.

== Early life ==
Hārūn was born in Rey, then part of Jibal in the Abbasid Caliphate, in present-day Tehran Province, Iran. He was the son of al-Mahdi (r. 775–785), the third Abbasid caliph, and his wife al-Khayzuran, who was a woman of strong and independent personality who greatly influenced affairs of state in the reigns of her husband and sons. Growing up Harun studied history, geography, rhetoric, music, poetry, and economics. However, most of his time was dedicated to mastering hadith and the Quran. In addition, he underwent advanced physical education as a future mujahid, and as a result, he practiced swordplay, archery, and learned the art of war. His birth date is debated, with various sources giving dates from 763 to 766.

Before becoming a caliph, in 780 and again in 782, Hārūn had already nominally led campaigns against the caliphate's traditional enemy, the Eastern Roman Empire, ruled by Empress Irene. The latter expedition was a huge undertaking, and even reached the Asian suburbs of Constantinople. According to the Muslim chronicler Al-Tabari, the Byzantines lost tens of thousands of soldiers, and Harun employed 20,000 mules to carry the riches back. Upon his return to the Abbasid realm, the cost of a sword fell to one dirham and the price of a horse to a single gold Byzantine dinar.

Harun's raids against the Byzantines elevated his political image and once he returned, he was given the laqab "al-Rashid", meaning "the Rightly-Guided One". He was promoted to crown prince and given the responsibility of governing the empire's western territories, from Syria to Azerbaijan.

Upon the death of his father in 785, Harun's brother al-Hadi became caliph. However, al-Hadi's reign was brief: a year and two months. Al-Hadi clashed with their mother over her great influence in court, and he attempted to depose Harun as crown prince in favor of his son Jafar. The position of their mother, al-Khayzuran, regarding these events was completely opposed to what al-Hadi wanted. She clearly favored her son Harun, who was dutiful toward her, until al-Hadi prevented her from handling any affairs of the state as she had been accustomed to at the beginning of his reign. Princes, commanders and petitioners would seek her permission to come to her door, asking her to intercede on their behalf so that al-Hadi would attend to their needs; they would line up outside her door and did so repeatedly. She also tried to guide him in the way of his father, advising him on what to do and what to avoid; in every appointment and dismissal, financial reward, execution or punishment, and important political plan, she would offer him her counsel. However, al-Hadi gradually grew weary of her interventions and orders, especially when he saw her favoring his brother Harun during his attempts to depose him. His irritation increased because he was also jealous of the attention men gave her. Al-Hadi swore that if any prince or member of his household or servants approached her door again, he would strike off his head and seize his wealth, saying:

“If it reaches me that any of my commanders, my intimates, or my servants stand at your door, I will strike off his head and confiscate his wealth. Let whoever wishes abide by that. What are these processions that come and go to your door every day? Do you not have a spindle to occupy you, a Qur’an to remind you, or a house to protect you? Beware, beware: do not open your door to a Muslim or non-Muslim."

Al-Khayzuran became angry at him, swore that she would never speak to him again, left the palace, and lived in another house. The historian al-Tabari notes varying accounts of al-Hadi's death, e.g. an abdominal ulcer or assassination prompted by his own mother.

== Caliphate ==
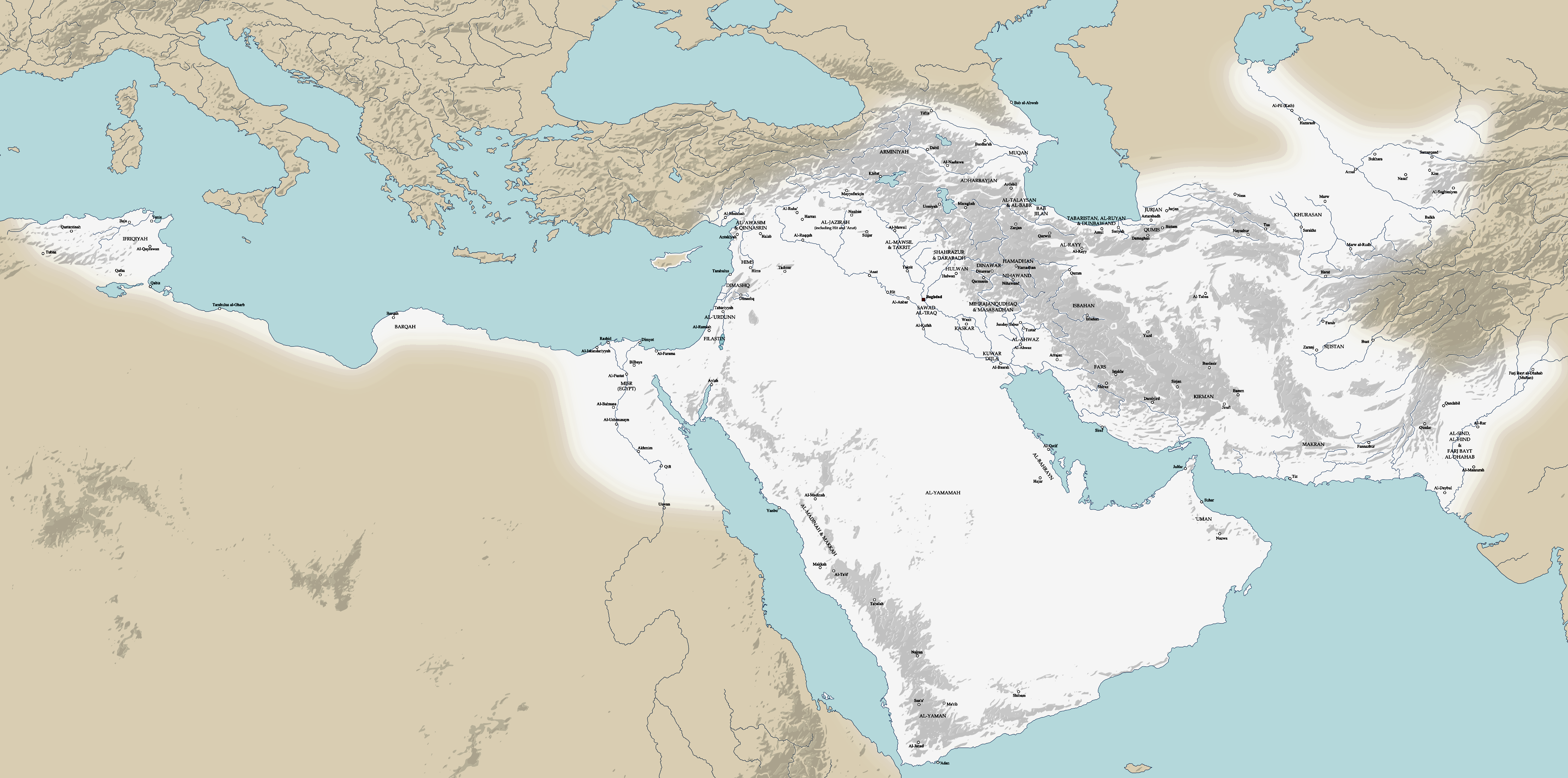
Map of the Abbasid Caliphate and its provinces, c. 788

On the night of al-Hadi's death, al-Khayzuran quickly released Yahya ibn Khalid from prison and ordered him to pay the army's wages, send the letters to the governors to pledge allegiance to al-Rashīd, and prepare him as caliph. They summoned the commanders of the army, Harthama ibn A'yan and Khuzayma ibn Khazim, and asked them to swear allegiance to Harun as caliph. Khuzayma reportedly gathered and armed 5,000 of his own followers, dragged the Ja'far ibn al-Hādī from his bed and forced him to publicly renounce his claims in favour of Hārūn. Hārūn became caliph in 786 when he was in his early twenties. At the time, he was tall, good looking, and slim but strongly built, with wavy hair and olive skin. On the day of accession, his son al-Ma'mun was born, and al-Amin some little time later: the latter was the son of Zubaida, a granddaughter of al-Mansur (founder of the city of Baghdad); so he took precedence over the former, whose mother was a Persian. Upon his accession, Harun led Friday prayers in Baghdad's Great Mosque and then sat publicly as officials and the layman alike lined up to swear allegiance and declare their happiness at his ascent to Amir al-Mu'minin. He began his reign by appointing very able ministers, who carried on the work of the government so well that they greatly improved the condition of the people.

Under Hārūn al-Rashīd's rule, Baghdad flourished into the most splendid city of its period. Tribute paid by many rulers to the caliph funded architecture, the arts and court luxuries.

In 796, Hārūn moved the entire court to Raqqa on the middle Euphrates, where he spent 12 years, most of his reign. He appointed the Hanafi jurist Muhammad al-Shaybani as qadi (judge), but dismissed him in 803. He visited Baghdad only once. Several reasons may have influenced the decision to move to Raqqa: its closeness to the Byzantine border, its excellent communication lines via the Euphrates to Baghdad and via the Balikh river to the north and via Palmyra to Damascus, rich agricultural land, and the strategic advantage over any rebellion which might arise in Syria and the middle Euphrates area. Abu al-Faraj al-Isfahani, in his anthology of poems, depicts the splendid life in his court. In Raqqa the Barmakids managed the fate of the empire, and both heirs, al-Amin and al-Ma'mun, grew up there. At some point the royal court relocated again to Al-Rayy, the capital city of Khorasan, where the famous philologist and leader of the Kufan school, Al-Kisa'i, accompanied the caliph with his entourage. When al-Kisa'i became ill while in Al-Rayy, it is said that Harun visited him daily. It seems al-Shaybani and al-Kisa'i both died there on the same day in 804.

For the administration of the whole empire, he fell back on his mentor and longtime associate Yahya bin Khalid bin Barmak. Rashid appointed him as his vizier with full executive powers, and, for seventeen years, Yahya and his sons served Rashid faithfully in whatever assignment he entrusted to them.

Harun made many pilgrimages to Mecca by camel (2,820 km or 1,750 mi from Baghdad) several times, e.g., 793, 795, 797, 802 and last in 803. Tabari concludes his account of Harun's reign with these words: "It has been said that when Harun ar-Rashid died, there were nine hundred million odd (dirhams) in the state treasury."

According to Shia belief, Harun imprisoned and poisoned Musa ibn Ja'far, the 7th Imam, in Baghdad.

Under al-Rashid, each city had its own law enforcement, which besides keeping order was supposed to examine the public markets in order to ensure, for instance, that proper scales and measures were used; enforce the payment of debts; and clamp down on illegal activities such as gambling, usury, and sales of alcohol.

Harun was a great patron of art and learning, and is best known for the unsurpassed splendor of his court and lifestyle. Some of the stories, perhaps the earliest, of "The Thousand and One Nights" were inspired by the glittering Baghdad court. The character King Shahryar (whose wife, Scheherazade, tells the tales) may have been based on Harun himself.

=== Advisors ===
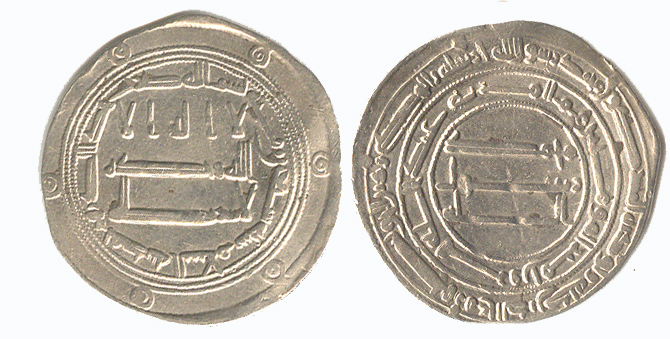
A silver dirham minted in Madinat al-Salam (Baghdad) in 170 AH (AD 786). At the reverse, the inner marginal inscription says: "By order of the slave of God, Harun, Commander of the Faithful"

Hārūn was influenced by the will of his powerful mother in the governance of the empire until her death in 789; When he became caliph, Harun allowed her (Khayzuran) a free hand and, at times, restrained his own desires out of deference to her expressed wishes, and Khayzuran acted as an overseer of affairs, and Yahya deferred to her and acted on her advice. His vizier (chief minister) Yahya ibn Khalid, Yahya's sons (especially Ja'far ibn Yahya), and other Barmakids generally controlled the administration. The position of Persians in the Abbasid caliphal court reached its peak during al-Rashid's reign.

The Barmakids were an Iranian family (from Balkh) that dated back to the Barmak, a hereditary Buddhist priest of Nava Vihara, who converted after the Islamic conquest of Balkh and became very powerful under al-Mahdi. Yahya had helped Hārūn to obtain the caliphate, and he and his sons were in high favor until 798, when the caliph threw them in prison and confiscated their land. Al-Tabari dates this event to 803 and lists various reasons for it: Yahya's entering the Caliph's presence without permission; Yahya's opposition to Muhammad ibn al Layth, who later gained Harun's favour; and Ja'far's release of Yahya ibn Abdallah ibn Hasan, whom Harun had imprisoned.

The fall of the Barmakids is far more likely due to their behaving in a manner that Harun found disrespectful (such as entering his court unannounced) and making decisions in matters of state without first consulting him. Al-Fadl ibn al-Rabi succeeded Yahya the Barmakid as Harun's chief minister.

=== Diplomacy ===
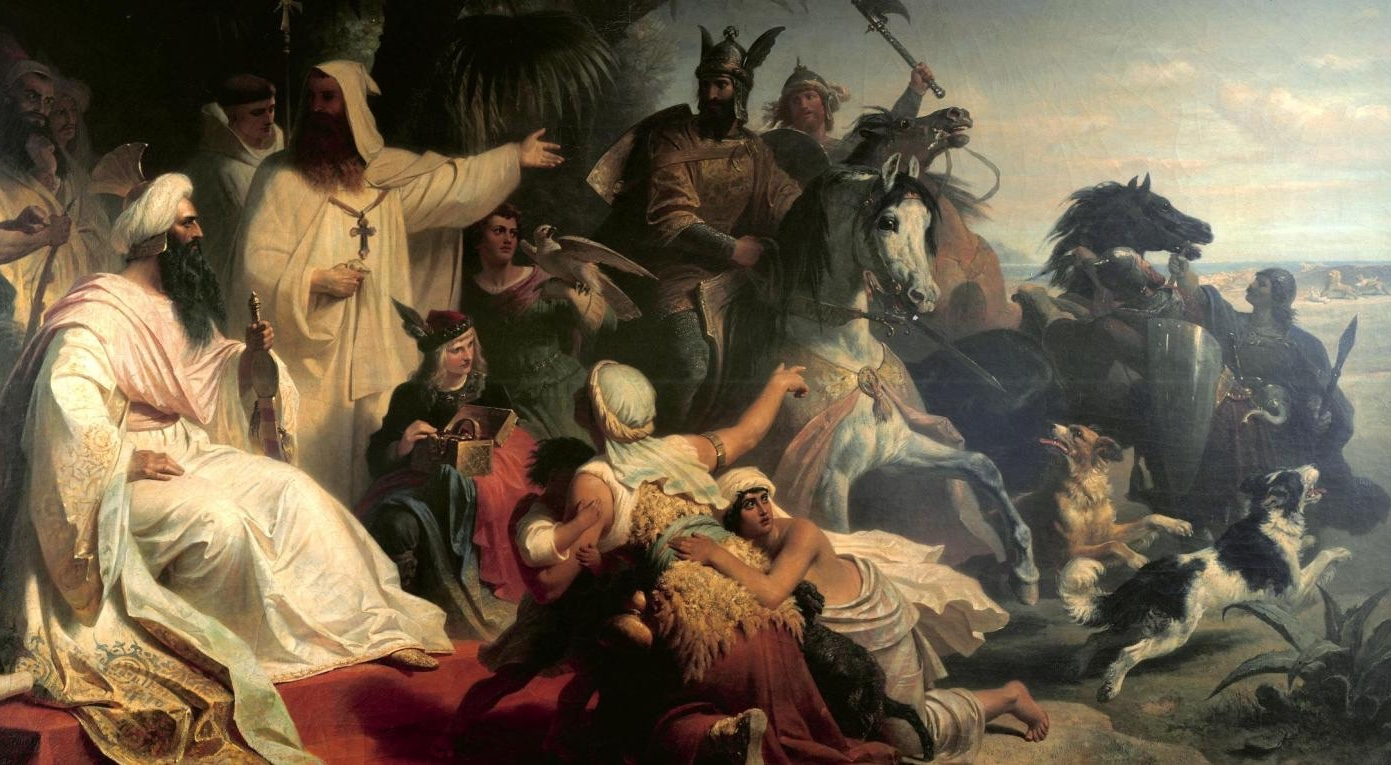
Harun al-Rashid, at left, receiving a delegation sent by Charlemagne to his court in Baghdad. 1864 painting by Julius Köckert.

Both Einhard and Notker the Stammerer refer to envoys traveling between the courts of Harun and Charlemagne, king of the Franks, and entering friendly discussions about Christian access to holy sites and gift exchanges. Notker mentions Charlemagne sent Harun Spanish horses, colorful Frisian cloaks and impressive hunting dogs. In 802 Harun sent Charlemagne a present consisting of silks, brass candelabra, perfume, balsam, ivory chessmen, a colossal tent with many-colored curtains, an elephant named Abul-Abbas, and a water clock that marked the hours by dropping bronze balls into a bowl, as mechanical knights – one for each hour – emerged from little doors which shut behind them. The presents were unprecedented in Western Europe and may have influenced Carolingian art. This exchange of embassies was due to the common interests, Charlemagne's conflict with the Umayyad state of Córdoba is one of the possible military conflicts which made him an ally of Harun al-Rashid, as they found a common enemy to unite against. For Charlemagne, the alliance may also have functioned as a counterweight against the Byzantine Empire, (traditional political enemy of the Caliphate) which was opposed to his role in Italy and his claim to the title of Roman Emperor. For Harun al-Rashid, there was an advantage in having a partner against his rivals in the Umayyad state of Córdoba, Al-Andalus.

When the Byzantine empress Irene was deposed in 802, Nikephoros I became emperor and refused to pay tribute to Harun, saying that Irene should have been receiving the tribute the whole time. News of this angered Harun, who wrote a message on the back of the Byzantine emperor's letter and said, "In the name of God the most merciful, From Amir al-Mu'minin Harun ar-Rashid, commander of the faithful, to Nikephoros, dog of the Romans. Thou shalt not hear, thou shalt behold my reply". After campaigns in Asia Minor, Nikephoros was forced to conclude a treaty, with humiliating terms. According to Dr Ahmad Mukhtar al-Abadi, it is due to the particularly fierce second retribution campaign against Nikephoros, that the Byzantine practically ceased any attempt to incite any conflict against the Abbasid again until the rule of Al-Ma'mun.

An alliance was established with the Chinese Tang dynasty by Ar-Rashid after he sent embassies to China. He was called "A-lun" in the Chinese Tang Annals. The alliance was aimed against the Tibetans.

When diplomats and messengers visited Harun in his palace, he was screened behind a curtain. No visitor or petitioner could speak first, interrupt, or oppose the caliph. They were expected to give their undivided attention to the caliph and calculate their responses with great care.

=== Religious policy ===
His father, al-Mahdi had two important religious policies: the persecution of the zanadiqa, or dualists, and the declaration of orthodoxy. Al-Mahdi declared that the caliph had the ability, and indeed the responsibility, to define the orthodox theology of Muslims to protect the umma against heresy.

His father, Al-Mahdi, ordered the composition of polemical works to refute freethinkers and other heretics, and for years he tried to exterminate them absolutely, hunting them down and exterminating freethinkers in large numbers, putting to death anyone on mere suspicion of being a zindiq. As a successor of al-Mahdi and caliph Musa al-Hadi and Harun al-Rashid, continued the pogroms, although with diminished intensity during the reign of the latter and was later abolished by him, Harun kept the ban on heretics but stopped the execution of every heretic.

Harun al-Rāshid kept Abu Yusuf as a close acquaintance, Harun eventually granted him the title of Grand Qadi, or Qadi 'l-qudat; the first time such a title had been conferred upon someone in Islamic history. While at the time it was meant as an honorific title, the Caliph frequently consulted Abu Yusuf on legal matters and financial policy and even bestowed upon him the ability to appoint other Qadis in the empire. This made the position of Grand Qadi analogous to a modern-day chief justice. Abu Yusuf held the position of grand Qadi until his death in 182/798CE.

=== Suppression of Alid theocratic revolt ===
The Alids Yahya ibn Abdallah, Idris ibn Abdallah, and a few others were sheltered by a Khuza'i tribesman, who helped them flee Arabia to the Kingdom of Aksum (in modern Ethiopia). Yahya and Idris spent some time there as guests of the king, before returning to Arabia, and meeting with some Alid loyalists near Mecca. At this meeting, it was decided that the two brothers were to split, each going to a different place in the periphery of the Abbasid empire: Idris went to the Maghreb, where he founded an independent dynasty in what is now Morocco, and Yahya to Yemen. The medieval sources provide diverging information on Yahya's movements during the next years. The most reliable account holds that he went to Yemen, Upper Mesopotamia, Armenia, and Baghdad, where he was recognized and forced again to flee to Yemen, where he stayed at Sana'a for eight months. It is likely during this time (c. 790/91) that the young scholar al-Shafi'i, the founder of one of the four schools of jurisprudence of Sunni Islam, came to visit him and was taught by him. From Yemen, Yahya moved to Khurasan. It was there that he learned of the death of his brother Idris, a victim to poisoning. This prompted him to seek refuge in Tabaristan, a mountainous region along the southern shore of the Caspian Sea that had only been under Abbasid rule since 761, but where the highlands remained in the hands of autonomous local dynasties who were still Zoroastrian and occasionally rose in revolt against the Abbasid governors. Yahya wrote to one of them, the Bavandid ruler Sharwin I (r. 772–817), requesting asylum for three years. Sharwin agreed, but counselled Yahya to seek refuge with the neighbouring king of Daylam, Justan (r. 791–805), who would be better able to protect him from the Abbasids. Following that advice, Yahya arrived in Daylam in 791/2, and was soon joined there by many supporters, proclaiming a revolt in 792.

The Caliph in response entrusted the suppression of the revolt to his trusted aide, the Barmakid al-Fadl ibn Yahya, naming him governor of Tabaristan and the neighbouring provinces, and giving him an army of 50,000 men. Al-Fadl sent letters to Yahya and Justan, promising a pardon for the former and a million silver dirhams to the latter, if they laid down their arms. Yahya was eventually moved to accept the offer; according to his own later account, this was because of dissension among his own followers, and because the wife of the king of Daylam urged her husband to accept as well. Yahya took precautions against possible treachery by carefully composing the letter of pardon for himself and seventy unnamed followers, had the Caliph himself write it out, and a number of prominent scholars, jurists, and members of the Abbasid dynasty endorse it. He only surrendered to al-Fadl after obtaining a letter of safe-passage from him.

Another account also tells how Yahya first travelled to the eastern regions of Juzjan, Balkh, and even Transoxiana, where he supposedly stayed with the khaghan of the Turks. The veracity of this report is considered dubious, but it is notable that when al-Fadl ibn Yahya was eventually sent against Yahya shortly after, al-Fadl is reliably recorded to have first defeated the khaghan. On the other hand, another report that al-Fadl was the one to encourage Yahya to seek refuge in Daylam and rise in revolt, and that his dispatch to suppress it was a test of his loyalty by the Caliph, is rejected by modern historians.

=== Punishment for Alid rebels and Fall of Barmakid family ===
Initially, Yahya ibn Abdallah was welcomed in Baghdad with great honour, and he received lavish gifts—200,000 or even 400,000 gold dinars—from the Caliph and al-Fadl. His arrival in the Abbasid capital was heralded as a sign of reconciliation between the Alids and the Abbasids. Nevertheless, Harun al-Rashid remained suspicious, and tried to keep him in Baghdad where he could be kept under control, whereas the letter of pardon explicitly guaranteed Yahya the right to go wherever he wanted. As a result, the Caliph had to allow Yahya to go for the Hajj to Mecca. Afterwards, Yahya did not return to Baghdad but moved to his family's estates near Medina, with the permission of al-Fadl. This was done without the Caliph's permission, or even knowledge; al-Fadl, who scrupulously observed the stipulations of the agreement, even ignored the Caliph's request to bring Yahya back to Baghdad. Al-Fadl's actions were in line with the Barmakids' favoured policy of reconciliation with the Alids. The reasons behind this are unclear, but the Barmakids may possibly have aspired to the Abbasids' establishing a more absolutist and theocratic regime, based on a divine mandate.

Now free of the Caliph's control, Yahya spent much of the sums he had received to pay the debt of Alid al-Husayn ibn Ali al-Abid, and provide for other Alids who were in need of money. To prevent any possible Alid uprising led by Yahya, the suspicious Harun al-Rashid appointed Abdallah ibn Mus'ab al-Zubayri (796/97) and soon after his son, Bakkar (797–809), as governors of Medina. As descendants of Abd Allah ibn al-Zubayr, who had claimed the caliphate during the Second Fitna, they were vehemently hostile to the Alids. Bakkar especially soon began denouncing Yahya as behaving like another caliph, and sent alarming reports to Harun al-Rashid about the affection and respect he commanded among the common people, who came from afar to visit him.

Alarmed at this, Harun al-Rashid had Yahya brought back to Baghdad, where he was kept alternately in prison or in house arrest. Several stories tell of his maltreatment at the Caliph's hands, but most of them contain obviously fictional elements and contradict each other. In 800, Abdallah ibn Mus'ab ibn Thabit appeared before Harun al-Rashid and claimed that he had received summons (da'wa) on behalf of Yahya for an uprising, and argued that, given his well-known antipathy to the Alids, if he been contacted, then the entire rest of the court must already have sided with Yahya. The Caliph had Yahya brought to him and confronted the two men. The Alid denied the accusation, and demanded a trial by oath (mubahala): Yahya cursed Abdallah, who indeed died on the same day (29 March 809), resulting in Yahya being cleared of all charges.

This did not stay Harun al-Rashid's suspicions for long. The Caliph was particularly irritated by the use that Yahya made of the blanket pardon for seventy unnamed followers of his: while Yahya refused to name them, whenever one of his followers was captured, Yahya claimed that he was one of those seventy. Frustrated, the Caliph convened an assembly of jurists to reassess the validity of the pardon. When one of them, Muhammad al-Shaybani, declared that the letter of pardon was not only valid, but inviolable, the irate Caliph threw his inkstand at him. According to one account, the Caliph had Yahya ibn Khalid al-Barmaki (the father of al-Fadl) testify to the assembly that Yahya's agents were gathering the pledge of allegiance from the common people of Baghdad, and that a courier on his way to Balkh had been intercepted, with letters calling for an uprising in Khurasan. Eventually, the qadi Abu al-Bakhtari Wahb ibn Wahb declared the letter as invalid and cut it with a knife.

Harun al-Rashid nevertheless hesitated to proceed publicly against Yahya. Instead, he handed him over to another Barmakid, al-Fadl's brother Ja'far, with instructions that he was to kill him. However, Yahya managed to persuade Ja'far to allow him to escape instead, with the promise that he would go into exile in the Byzantine Empire for as long as Harun al-Rashid lived. Ja'far let his prisoner go, but Yahya was captured at the border town of al-Massisa, and brought before the local governor, Muhammad ibn Khalid, another Barmakid. Muhammad immediately recognized Yahya, and was terrified: if Ja'far's action became known to the Caliph, the life of all Barmakids would be forfeit. Muhammad thus quickly went to meet the Caliph, who was on the Hajj to Mecca in 802. Harun al-Rashid kept the affair quiet for the moment, but once he returned from the Hajj, he ordered Ja'far executed, and all other Barmakids—apart from Muhammad ibn Khalid—arrested and their properties confiscated. The downfall of the Barmakids is shrouded in mystery, and its true causes are still not known with certainty; it may be that Harun al-Rashid wanted to rid himself of a group that might threaten or limit his own power. The brutal manner in which Ja'far was executed, however, is directly linked to his allowing Yahya's escape by Abu Muhammad al-Yazidi, whom the great 10th-century historian al-Tabari held to be the most authoritative source on the Barmakid family. Following the downfall of the Barmakids, Yahya was given over to al-Sindi ibn Shahak, the security chief (sahib al-shurta) of the capital.

=== Suppression of rebellions ===
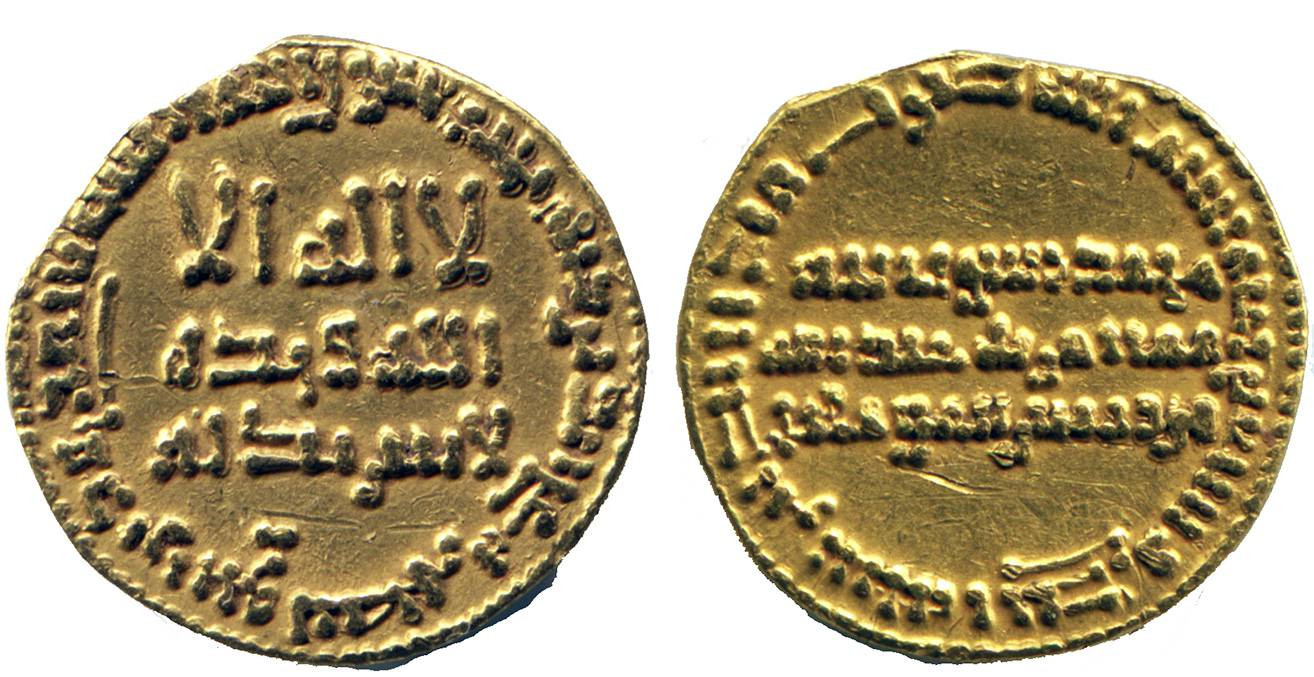
Dinar of Harun 171 AH (AD 787–88), the early years of his reign

Because of the Thousand and One Nights tales, Harun al-Rashid turned into a legendary figure obscuring his true historic personality. In fact, his long reign initiated some political revolts: In 794 Kharijite Al-Walid ibn Tarif revolted against the caliph Harun al-Rashid and quickly gathered a large number of supporters around him. He soon overran much of the Jazira and killed the governor of Diyar Rabi'a when the latter marched against him, then invaded Diyar Mudar and besieged 'Abd al-Malik ibn Salih in Raqqa. The Kharijites subsequently moved on to Arminiya and besieged Khilat, whose inhabitants agreed to ransom themselves in exchange for their liberty, and proceeded to invade Adharbayjan, Hulwan, the Sawad of Iraq and the districts on the west bank of the Tigris, enriching themselves along the way. They then returned to the Jazira, causing devastation to the province, and gained additional followers for their cause.

In an effort to stop the Kharijites, Harun al-Rashid sent two armies in succession against them, but they were defeated by the rebels and both of their commanders died in combat. The caliph then put Yazid ibn Mazyad al-Shaybani in command of a large army and dispatched him against al-Walid, urging him to bring an end to the insurgency as soon as possible. Yazid met the rebels in battle in late 795, at al-Haditha above Hit, and defeated al-Walid in single combat, killing him and cutting off his head. Yazid also killed a large number of the Kharijites and forced the remainder to disperse, and the revolt ended in defeat.

Many Alids managed to escape the battle by mingling with the pilgrims. Among them were Yahya ibn Abdallah and his brother Idris ibn Abdallah. Idris eventually moved to the Maghreb, and in 789 established the Idrisid dynasty in the area of modern Morocco, while his brother Yahya raised a revolt in Daylam in 792. At the news of the Alids' defeat, governor of Medina al-Umari burned the houses of the Alids and their supporters and confiscated their properties.

Harun faced rebellion in Ifriqiya, The revolt was suppressed against the Abbasid governor of Ifriqya, Muhammad ibn Muqatil al-Akki. As a reward, on 9 July 800 Harun al-Rashid recognized Ibrahim ibn al-Aghlab as emir of Ifriqiya, and bestowed semi-autonomy in exchange for an annual payment of 40,000 gold dinars to the Abbasid treasury. This allowed Ibrahim and his successors to establish the hereditary semi-autonomous governorship. Ibrahim was successful in subduing the rebels and made the region under Arab control.

Under Harun al-Rashid, Ali bin Isa bin Mahan continued to serve as commander of the guard until 796, when Ali ibn Isa was named governor of Khurasan. As a leader of the abna al-dawla, the troops that formed the core of the Abbasid army in Iraq, he antagonized the Khurasanis and oppressed them through heavy taxation, with the revenue diverted for the upkeep of the abna and for filling his own coffers; during his eight-year tenure, he amassed a vast fortune. His misgovernment provoked widespread discontent, and a spate of Kharijite uprisings. In April 805, as more and more complaints reached Harun, he went to Rayy to inspect the situation for himself. However, when Ali came and presented himself before the Caliph, he brought with him an enormous treasure in precious objects—worth 30 million gold dinars according to one source—which he liberally distributed to the Caliph's entourage and family. As a result, Harun not only kept him in place, but even accompanied him for part of his return journey, a rare mark of honour. Eventually, Ali's misconduct resulted in the outbreak of a major rebellion under Rafi ibn al-Layth, which eventually required the personal intervention of Harun al-Rashid in 808.

== Family ==
Harun's first wife was Zubaidah. She was the daughter of his paternal uncle, Ja'far and maternal aunt Salsal, sister of Al-Khayzuran. They married in 781–82, at the residence of Muhammad bin Sulayman in Baghdad. She had one son, Caliph Al-Amin. She died in 831. Another of his wives was Azizah, daughter of Ghitrif, brother of Al-Khayzuran. She had been formerly married to Sulayman ibn Abi Ja'far, who had divorced her. Another was Ghadir also known as Amat-al-Aziz, who had been formerly a concubine of his brother al-Hadi. She had one son Ali. She died in 789. Another wife was Umm Muhammad, the daughter of Salih al-Miskin and Umm Abdullah, the daughter of Isa bin Ali. They married in November–December 803 in Al-Raqqah. She had been formerly been married to Ibrahim ibn al-Mahdi, who had repudiated her. Another wife married around the same year was Abbasa, daughter of Sulayman ibn Abi Ja'far. Another wife was Jurashiyyah al-Uthmanniyah. She was the daughter of Abdullah bin Muhammad, and had descended from Uthman, the third Caliph of the Rashidun.

Harun's earliest known concubine was Hailanah. She had been a slave girl of Yahya ibn Khalid, the Barmakid. It was she who begged him, while he was yet a prince, to take her away from the elderly Yahya. Harun then approached Yahya, who presented him with the girl. She died three years later in 789–90, and Harun mourned her deeply. Another concubine was Dananir. She was a Barmakid, and had been formerly a slave girl of Yahya ibn Khalid. She had been educated at Medina and had studied instrumental and vocal music. Another concubine was Marajil. She was a Persian, and came from distant Badhaghis in Persia. She was one of the ten maids presented to Harun. She gave birth to Abdullah (future caliph Al-Ma'mun) on the night of Harun's accession to the throne, in September 786, in whose birth she died. Her son was then adopted by Zubaidah. Another concubine was Qasif, mother of Al-Qasim. He was Harun's second son, born to a concubine mother. Harun's eldest daughter Sukaynah was also born to her.

Another concubine was Maridah. Her father was Shabib. She was a Sogdian, and was born in Kufah. She was one of the ten maids presented to Harun by Zubaidah. She had five children. These were Abu Ishaq (future caliph al-Mu'tasim), Abu Isma'il, Umm Habib, and two others whose names are unknown. She was Harun's favourite concubine. Some other favourite concubines were, Dhat al-Khal, Sihr, and Diya. Diya died much to Harun's sorrow. Dhat al-Khal also known as Khubth and Khunth, was a singer, belonging to a slave-dealer who was himself a freedman of Abbasah, the sister of Al-Rashid. She caught the fancy of Ibrahim al-Mausili, whose songs in praise of her soon reached Harun's attention, who bought her for the enormous sum of 70,000 dinars. She was the mother of Harun's son, Abu al-Abbas Muhammad. Sihr was mother of Harun's daughters, Khadijah and Karib. Another concubine was Inan. Her father was Abdullah. She was born and brought up in the Yamamah in central Arabia. She was a singer and a poet, and had been a slave girl of Abu Khalid al-Natifi. She bore Harun two sons, both of whom died young. She accompanied him to Khurasan where he, and, soon after, she died.

Another concubine was Ghadid, also known as Musaffa, and she was mother of Harun's daughters, Hamdunah and Fatimah. She was his favourite concubine. Hamdunah and Fatimah married Al-Hadi's sons, Isma'il and Ja'far respectively. Another concubine was Shikl. She was the mother of Abu Ali. She was purchased by Al-Rashid along with another girl named Shadhr also known as Sukkar. When Shadhr became pregnant and had a child named Umm Abiha, Shikl grew envious of her. This jealousy escalated to the point where it became widely known. Later, Shikl herself became pregnant and gave birth to Abu Ali. Despite the deaths of both mothers, the animosity between Abu Ali and Umm Abiha persisted. Another concubine was Hilanah. She had been formerly a concubine of his brother al-Hadi.

Another of Harun's concubines was the captive daughter of a Greek churchman of Heraclea acquired with the fall of that city in 806. Zubaidah once more presented him with one of her personal maids who had caught his fancy. Harun's half-brother, while governor of Egypt from 795 to 797, also sent him an Egyptian maid who immediately won his favour. Some other concubines were namely: Ri'm, mother of Salih; Irbah, mother of Abu Isa Muhammad; Sahdhrah, mother of Abu Yaqub Muhammad; Rawah, mother of Abu Sulayman Muhammad; Dawaj, mother of Abu Ali Muhammad; Kitman, mother of Abu Ahmad Muhammad; Hulab, mother of Arwa; Irabah, mother of Umm al-Hassan; Rahiq, mother of Umm Salamah; Khzq, mother of Umm al-Qasim; Haly, mother of Umm Ja'far Ramlah; Aniq, mother of Umm Ali; Samandal, mother of Umm al-Ghaliyah; Zinah, mother of Raytah; Qaina; Shajw.

== Death ==
A major revolt led by Rafi ibn al-Layth was started in Samarqand which forced Harun al-Rashid to move to Khorasan. He first removed and arrested Ali bin Isa bin Mahan but the revolt continued unchecked. (Harun had dismissed Ali and replaced him with Harthama ibn A'yan, and in 808 marched himself east to deal with the rebel Rafi ibn al-Layth, but died in March 809 while at Tus). Harun al-Rashid became ill and died very soon after when he reached Sanabad village in Tus and was buried in Dar al-Imarah, the summer palace of Humayd ibn Qahtaba, the Abbasid governor of Khorasan. Due to this historical event, the Dar al-Imarah was known as the Mausoleum of Haruniyyeh. The location later became known as Mashhad ("The Place of Martyrdom") because of the martyrdom of Imam al-Ridha in 818. Harun al-Rashid and his first Heir, prince al-Amin (Al-Amin was nominated first heir, Al-Ma'mun second and Al-Qasim was third heir.) After Harun's death in 809 he was succeeded by Al-Amin.

== Anecdotes ==
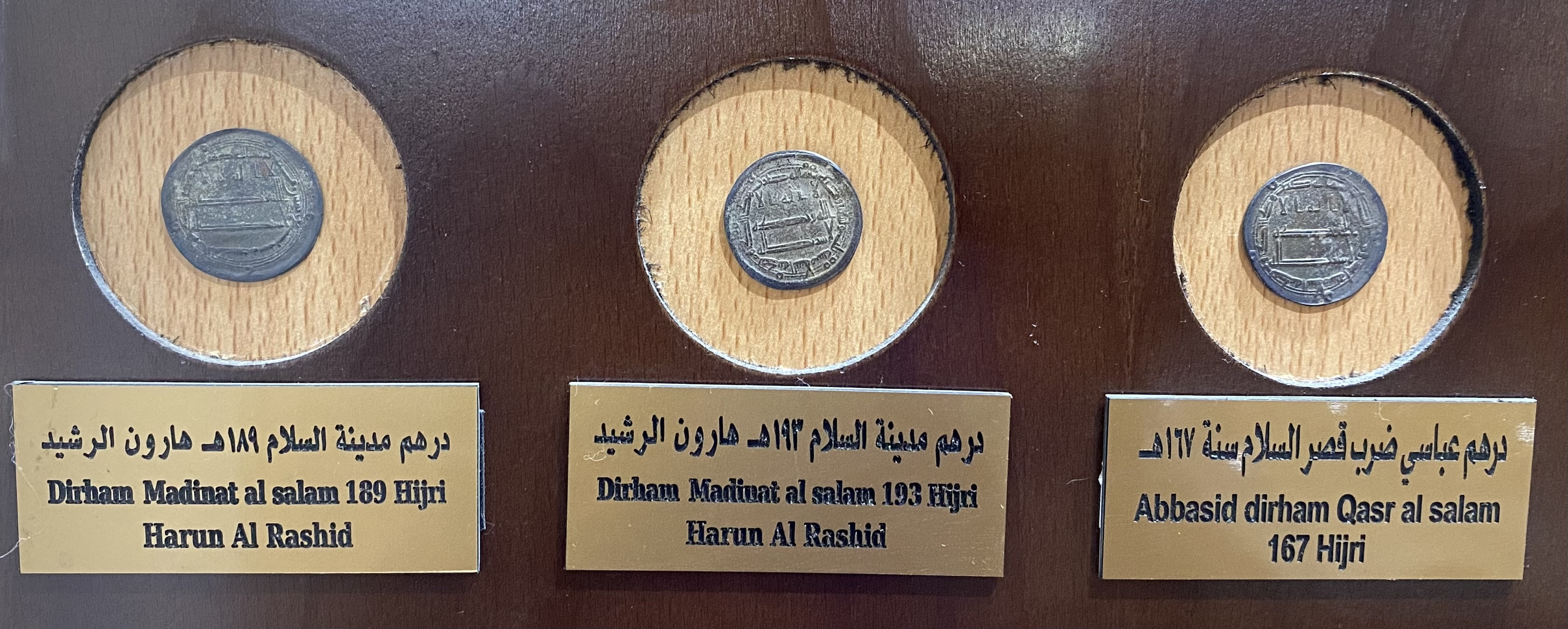
Harun Al Rashid coins on display in the Emirates Heritage Village collection in Abu Dhabi, United Arab Emirates

Many anecdotes attached themselves to the person of Harun al-Rashid in the centuries following his rule. Saadi of Shiraz inserted a number of them into his Gulistan.

Al-Masudi relates a number of interesting anecdotes in The Meadows of Gold that illuminate the caliph's character. For example, he recounts Harun's delight when his horse came in first, closely followed by al-Ma'mun's, at a race that Harun held at Raqqa. Al-Masudi tells the story of Harun setting his poets a challenging task. When others failed to please him, Miskin of Medina succeeded superbly well. The poet then launched into a moving account of how much it had cost him to learn that song. Harun laughed and said that he did not know which was more entertaining, the song or the story. He rewarded the poet.

There is also the tale of Harun asking Ishaq ibn Ibrahim to keep singing. The musician did so until the caliph fell asleep. Then, strangely, a handsome young man appeared, snatched the musician's lute, sang a very moving piece (al-Masudi quotes it) and left. On awakening and being informed of that, Harun said Ishaq ibn Ibrahim had received a supernatural visitation.

Shortly before he died, Harun is said to have been reading some lines by Abu al-Atahiya about the transitory nature of the power and pleasures of this world, an anecdote related to other caliphs as well.

=== Timeline of important events ===
- 763: Hārūn is born on 17 March, the son of al-Mahdi and the Yemeni Arab woman al-Khayzuran. This date is not certain as other sources give the various dates, from 763 to 768. Apart from 17 March 763, February 766 is the other most probable date of his birth.
- 780: Hārūn is the leader of military expeditions against the Isaurian Byzantine Empire.
- 782: Hārūn is the leader of a military campaign against the Byzantine Empire under Irene of Athens. The defection of the Armenian general Tatzates allows him to reach as far as the Bosporus. A peace treaty is signed on favorable terms. Harun receives the honorific title ar-Rashīd, named second in succession to the caliphal throne and also appointed governor of Tunisia, Egypt, Syria, Armenia and Azerbaijan.
- 786: 14 September: Hārūn's brother al-Hadi dies under mysterious circumstances – it was rumored that his supportive mother al-Khayzuran was responsible. Hārūn becomes the new caliph and makes Yahya the Barmakid his Vizier – but al-Khayzuran exercised much influence over the politics.
- 789: al-Khayzuran, mother of Harun dies
- 791: Hārūn wages war against the Byzantine Empire.
- 795: To prevent Shiite rebellions, Hārūn imprisons Alid scholar Musa al-Kazim.
- 796: Hārūn moves the Imperial residence and the government from Baghdad to Raqqa.
- 799: Alid scholar Musa al-Kazim died in 799 in the al-Sindi ibn Shahak prison of Baghdad, after being transferred from one prison to another for several years. He was allegedly poisoned by order of the caliph.
- 800: Hārūn appoints Ibrahim ibn al-Aghlab governor over Tunisia, making him a semi-autonomous governor in return for substantial yearly payments.
- 802: Hārūn gives two albino elephants to Charlemagne as a diplomatic gift.
- 805: Harun defeats Emperor Nikephoros I Logothetes at the Battle of Krasos.
- 807: Hārūn's forces occupy Cyprus.
- 809: Lead 5 expeditions against Abdurrahman Ad-Dakhil in Cyprus, wins the first battle in the north of Cyprus. Attacked by Ali An-Zabuhn while praying on Al-Masjid al-Nabawi, received injuries to his eyes. He died on 30 November after being injured for 1 day.

== Legacy ==
Al-Rashid become a prominent figure in the Muslim and Arab culture, he has been described as one of the most famous Arabs in history. All the Abbasid caliphs after him were his descendants.

About his accession famous poet and musician al-Mawsili said:

Did you not see how the sun came out of hiding on Harun's accession and flooded the world with light

About his reign, famous Arab historian Al-Masudi said:

So great were the Splendour and riches of his reign, such was its prosperity, that this period has been called "the Honeymoon".

Al-Rashid become the progenitor of subsequent Abbasid caliphs. Al-Rashid nominated his son Muhammad al-Amin as his first heir. Muhammad had an elder half-brother, Abdallah, the future al-Ma'mun (r. 813–833), who had been born in September 786 (six months older than him) However, Abdallah's mother was a Persian concubine, and his pure Abbasid lineage gave Muhammad seniority over his half-brother. Indeed, he was the only Abbasid caliph to claim such descent. Already in 792, Harun had Muhammad receive the oath of allegiance (bay'ah) with the name of al-Amīn ("The Trustworthy"), effectively marking him out as his main heir, while Abdallah was not named second heir, under the name al-Maʾmūn ("The Trusted One") until 799. and his third son Qasim was nominated third heir, however he never became caliph. Harun is sometimes accused of weakening the Abbasid legacy by dividing the kingdoms central powers between his two sons. This ultimately created tension between the two brothers. Among his sons, al-Amin became caliph after his death in 809. Al-Amin ruled from 809 to 813, until a civil war broke between him and his brother Abdallah al-Ma'mun (Governor of Khorasan). The reason of war were that caliph al-Amin tried to remove al-Ma'mun as his heir. Al-Ma'mun became caliph in 813 and ruled the caliphate for two decades until 833. He was succeeded by another of Harun's son Abu Ishaq Muhammad (better known as Al-Mu'tasim), his mother was Marida, a concubine.

== In popular culture ==
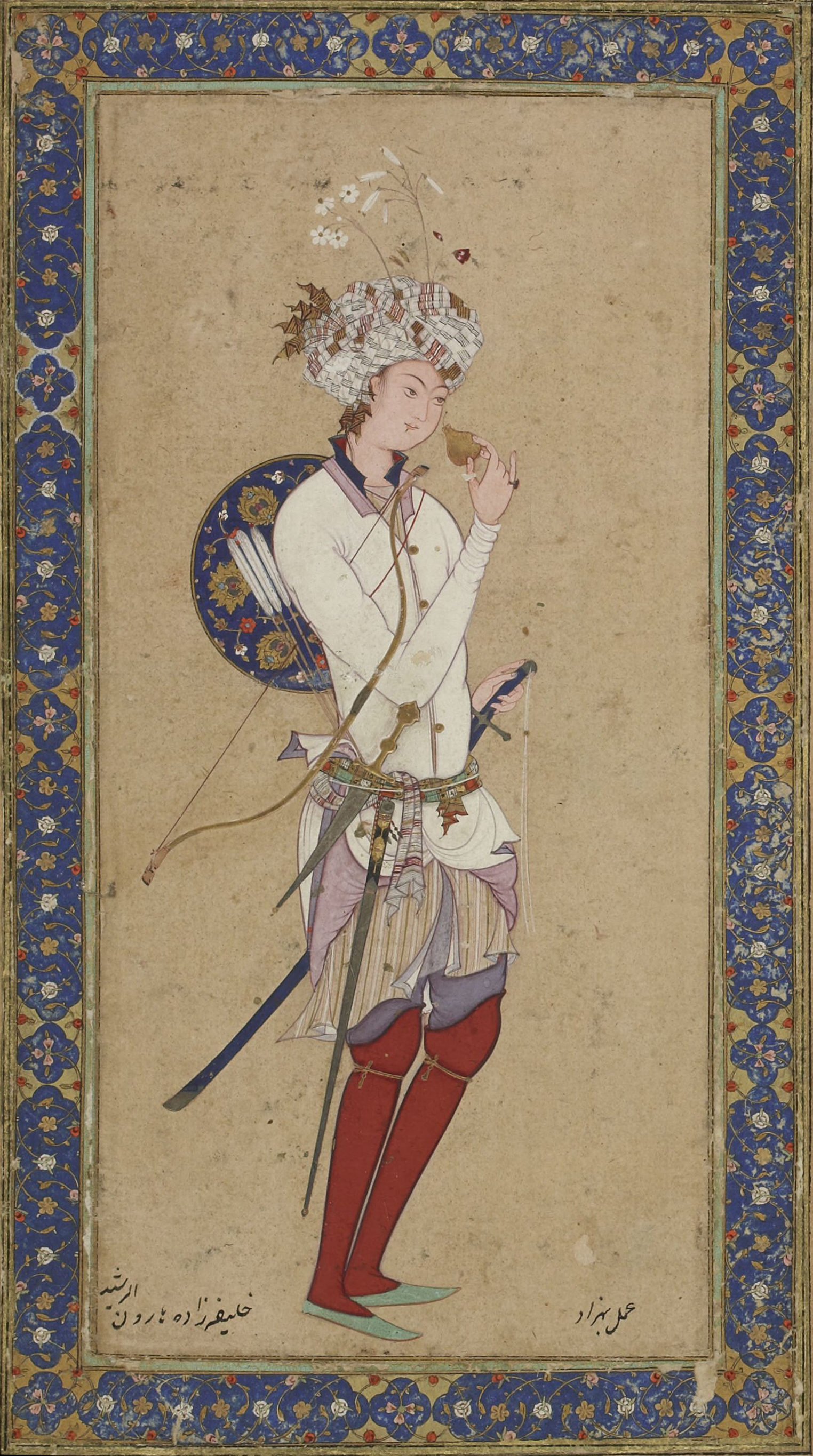
Harun al-Rashid as depicted in the Arabian Nights (One Thousand and One Nights).

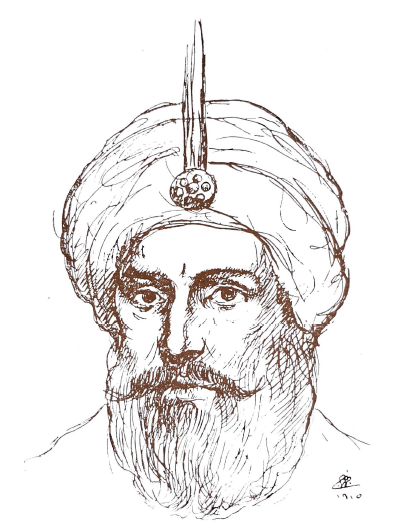
Sketch drawing of Harun al-Rashid by poet and visual artist Kahlil Gibran (1883–1931)

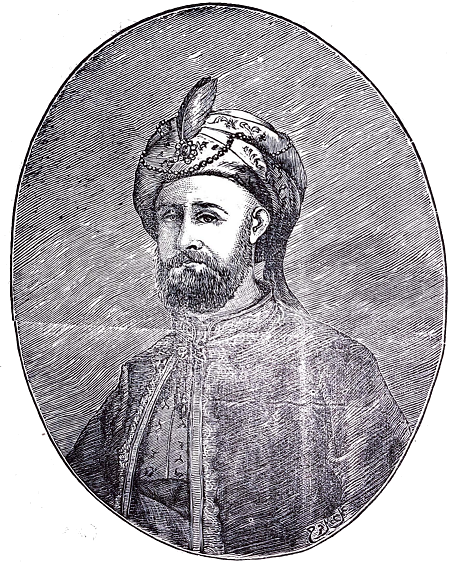
Harun al-Rashid from the book Kitab khizanat al-ayyam fī tarajim al-ʻizam, first published in New york in 1899.

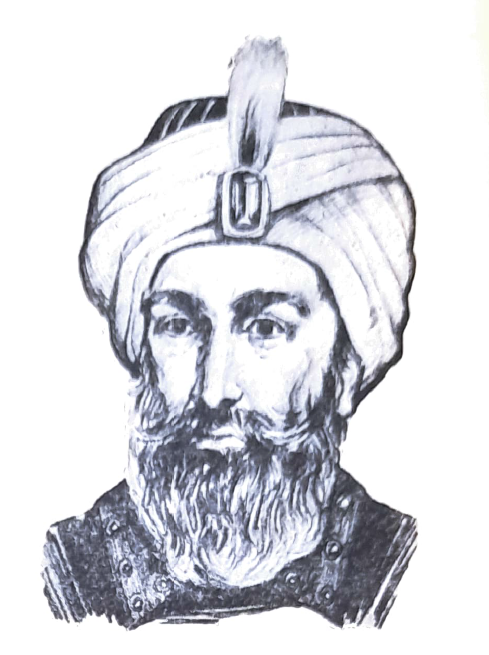
A sketch representation of Hārūn al-Rashid from a book entitled Sayr Mulhimah: Min al-Sharq wa-al-Gharb, first translated into Arabic and published in Egypt, 1381 AH/1961

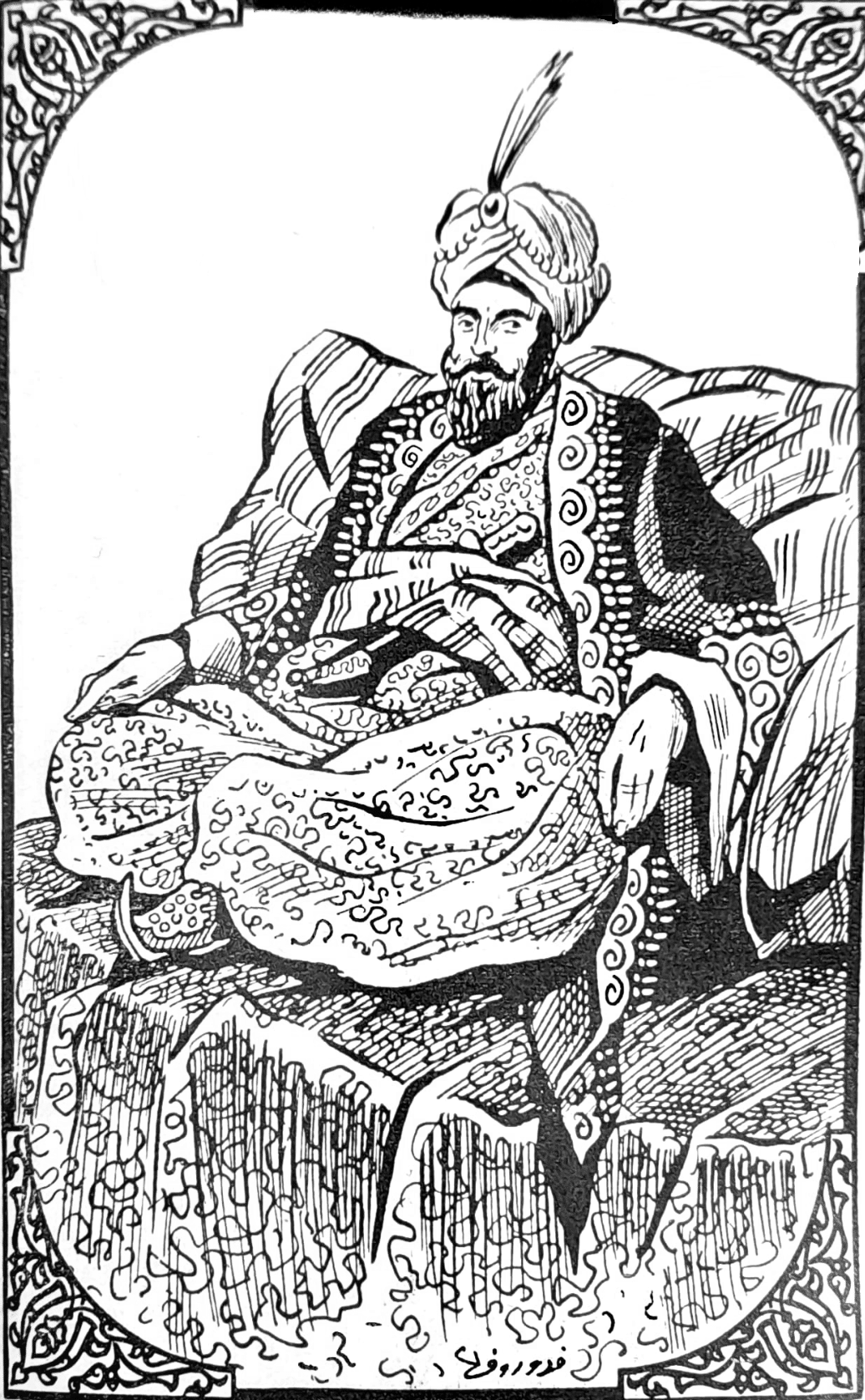
Harun al-Rashid as depicted in the book Harun Al-Rashid (1951)

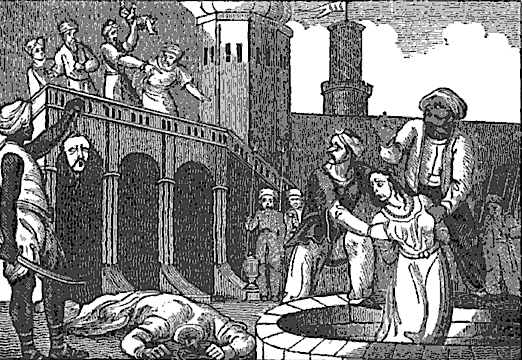
An illustration depicting the downfall of Barmakids from the artwork Cruel vengeance of the Caliph Haroun (1825)
- In Shinobu Ohtaka's Magi: The Labyrinth of Magic, the former king of Balbadd is called Rashid Saluja. In the spin-off Adventure of Sinbad, Rashid's alias is Harun.
- Henry Wadsworth Longfellow wrote a short poem titled "Haroun Al Raschid".
- O. Henry uses the character in his story "The Caliph and the Cad". The theme of the story is "turning the tables on Haroun al Raschid".
- Alfred Tennyson wrote a poem in his youth entitled "Recollections of the Arabian Nights". Every stanza (except the last one) ends with "of good Haroun Alraschid".
- Harun al-Rashid was a main figure and character in several of the stories in some of the oldest versions of the One Thousand and One Nights.
- The Indian television series Alif Laila (1993–1997), an adaptation of the Arabian Nights, features several tales involving the caliph from the classic collection of stories.
- Hārūn ar-Rashīd figures throughout James Joyce's Ulysses, in a dream of Stephen Dedalus, one of the protagonists. Stephen's efforts to recall this dream continue throughout the novel, culminating in the novel's fifteenth episode, wherein some characters also take on the guise of Hārūn.
- Harun al-Rashid is celebrated in a 1923 poem by W. B. Yeats, "The Gift of Harun al-Rashid".
- A story of one of Harun's wanderings provides the climax to the narrative game of titles at the end of Italo Calvino's If on a winter's night a traveler (1979). In Calvino's story, Harun wanders at night, only to be drawn into a conspiracy in which he is selected to assassinate the Caliph Harun-al-Rashid.
- In Charles Dickens' 1842 travelogue, American Notes for General Circulation, he compares American supporters of slavery to the "Caliph Harun al-Rashid in his angry robe of scarlet".
- The two protagonists of Salman Rushdie's 1990 novel Haroun and the Sea of Stories are Haroun and his father Rashid Khalifa.
- In the Sten science fiction novels by Allan Cole and Chris Bunch, the character of the Eternal Emperor uses the name "H. E. Raschid" when incognito; this is confirmed, in the final book of the series, as a reference to the character from Burton's translation of The Book of the Thousand Nights and a Night.
- The movie The Golden Blade (1952), starring Rock Hudson and Piper Laurie depicts the adventures of Harun who uses a magic sword to free a fairy-tale Baghdad from Jafar, the evil usurper of the throne. After he finally wins the hand of princess Khairuzan she awards him the title Al-Rashid ("the righteous").
- The comic book The Sandman features a story (issue 50, "Ramadan") set in the world of the One Thousand and One Nights, with Hārūn ar-Rashīd as the protagonist. It highlights his historical and mythical role as well as his discussion of the transitory nature of power. The story is included in the collection The Sandman: Fables and Reflections.
- Haroun El Poussah in the French comic strip Iznogoud is a satirical version of Hārūn ar-Rashīd.
- In Quest for Glory II, the sultan who adopts the Hero as his son is named Hārūn ar-Rashīd. He is often seen prophesying on the streets of Shapeir as The Poet Omar.
- Harun al-Rashid appears as the leader of Arabia in the video game Civilization V.
- Future US President Theodore Roosevelt, when he was a commissioner for the New York Police Department, was nicknamed "Haroun-al-Roosevelt" in several local newspapers.
- In The Master and Margarita, by novelist Mikhail Bulgakov, Harun al-Rashid is referred to by the character Korovyev in which he warns a door man not to judge him "by [his] suit", and to refer to the story of "the famous caliph, Harun al-Rashid".
- In the 1924 film Waxworks, a poet is hired by a wax museum proprietor to write back-stories for three wax models. Among these wax models is Harun al-Rashid, played by Emil Jannings.
- In the 2006 novel Variable Star by Robert Heinlein and Spider Robinson, chapter 1 is prefaced with a quotation from Alfred, Lord Tennyson's "Recollections of the Arabian Nights" regarding "good Harun Alrashid", the relevance of which becomes apparent in chapter 2 when one character relates stories (probably apocryphal and presumably drawn from Tennyson) of Harun al-Rashid to another character in order to use them as an analogy.
- The second chapter in the novel Prince Otto by Robert Louis Stevenson has the title "In which the Prince Plays Haroun al-Raschid".
- Harun al-Rashid appears in the children's comic book Mampato, in the stories "Bromiznar de Bagdad" and "Ábrete Sesamo", by the Chilean author Themo Lobos. In this story, al-Rashid is shown at first as lazy and indolent, but after a series of adventures he decides to take the leading role against an evil vizier and help the main character, Mampato.
- Frank Lloyd Wright designed a monument to al-Rashid as part of his proposed 1957 urban renewal plan for Baghdad, Iraq.
- In his book The Power Broker, Robert Caro compares New York City mayor Fiorello H. La Guardia to Harun al-Rashid in the way each "roam[ed] his domain".
- The Syrian television series Harun Al-Rashid (2018), starring Kosai Khauli, Karis Bashar, and Yasser Al-Masri, focuses on Harun and his relation with his brother Caliph Al-Hadi, and that preceded Harun's ascent to the Caliphate. It also focuses on his relations with his elder sons and nomination of Al-Amin and Al-Ma'mun as heir.
- The Caliph is a major character in James Elroy Flecker's play Hassan (1922), appearing as an urbane but capricious tyrant.
- The 2017 Qatari television series The Imam in which Harun was portrayed by actor Salloum Haddad.

== See also ==
- Isma'il ibn Salih ibn Ali al-Hashimi
- Ibrahim ibn Salih
- Great Qadi

Harun al-Rashid Abbasid dynasty Born: 763 Died: 809
Sunni Islam titles
Preceded by Al-Hadi	Caliph of the Abbasid Caliphate; 14 September 786 – 24 March 809	Succeeded by Al-Amin
