= Jahza al-Barmaki =

Singer, poet, and courtier of Caliph al-Mu'tamid era

Abu'l-Ḥasan Aḥmad ibn Jaʿfar al-Barmaki al-Nadim
- Born: c. 839; Abbasid Caliphate
- Died: June/July 936; Wasit, Abbasid Caliphate (now Iraq)
- Other names: Jahza al-Barmaki
- Occupation(s): Lute player and Author
- Era: Islamic Golden Age (Abbasid era)
- Known for: Singer, poet, and Abbasīd courtier, close Companion of Al-Muqtadir
- Notable work: Treatises on astrology, Lute-playing; Cooking, Author of Caliph al-Mu'tamid's biography
- Father: Jaʿfar ibn Musa

Abu'l-Ḥasan Aḥmad ibn Jaʿfar al-Barmakī al-Nadīm (839 – June/July 936), surnamed Jaḥẓa (Arabic: جحظة, lit. 'popping out, bulging') and al-Ṭunbūrī (lit. 'the lute player'), was a descendant of the Barmakid family, and a well-known scholar, singer, poet, and courtier of his time.

He was reportedly born in 839, the grandson of Musa ibn Yahya and great-grandson of the famous Yahya al-Barmaki, the vizier of Harun al-Rashid. The historian Charles Pellat describes him as "a man of very varied culture, but little religion, of doubtful morals and repulsive appearance"; he was nicknamed Jaḥẓa by the Abbasid prince and poet Ibn al-Mu'tazz, on account of his bulging eyeballs. He nevertheless was a prominent member of the courtly society of his time, and appears in multiple anecdotes, associating with the grandees of the Abbasid Caliphate's court. Little of his work survives, apart from a few poems; most of them are known through a list in the 10th-century compendium al-Fihrist, and include treatises on astrology, lute-playing, cooking, and a biography of Caliph al-Mu'tamid. He died at Wasit in June/July 936.

== Sources ==
- Pellat, Ch. (1965). "D̲j̲aḥẓa". In Lewis, B.; Pellat, Ch. & Schacht, J. (eds.). The Encyclopaedia of Islam, Second Edition. Volume II: C–G. Leiden: E. J. Brill. p. 389. doi:10.1163/1573-3912_islam_SIM_1940. OCLC 495469475.
