= Dominique Sourdel =

French historian and writer (1921–2014)

Dominique Sourdel (31 January 1921, Pont-Sainte-Maxence – 4 March 2014, Neuilly-sur-Seine) was a French historian who specialized in Medieval Islam.

He was professor of the Paris-Sorbonne University.

== Books ==
- L'Islam (1949), PUF, Que sais-je? nº355, 2002, 21ª ed. aggiornata

- Sourdel, D. (1962). Islam. Translated by Scott, Douglas. New York: Walker. OCLC 17805950.

- Le vizirat abbasside de 749 à 936 (132 à 324 de l'Hégire), Damas, PIFD, 1959
- La civilisation de l'islam classique, Arthaud « Les Grandes Civilisations », I ediz. 1968, con Janine Sourdel
- L'État impérial des califes abbassides, PUF, "Islamiques", 1999
- Histoire des arabes (1976), PUF, « Que sais-je? », nº 1627, 2003
- L'islam médiéval (1979), PUF, "Quadrige", 2005
  Sourdel, D. (1983). Medieval Islam. Translated by Watt, Montgomery W. London: Routledge & Kegan Paul. ISBN 978-0-710-09453-7 – via the Internet Archive.
- Sourdel, Janine; Sourdel, Dominique (2004). Dictionnaire historique de l'islam. Quadrige dicos poche. Paris: PUF. p. 1056. ISBN 978-2-13-054536-1.
- Vocabulaire de l'islam (2002), PUF, « Que sais-je? » nº3653, 2002 con Janine Sourdel
- Certificats de pèlerinage d'époque ayyoubide. Contribution à l'histoire de l'idéologie de l'islam au temps des Croisades, Paris, AIBL, 2006
- Sourdel, D.; Sourdel, J. (2007). A glossary of Islam. Edinburgh: Edinburgh University Press. ISBN 978-0-748-62138-5 – via Internet Archive.
