= Johannes Hendrik Kramers =

Dutch scholar of Islamic studies (1891–1951)

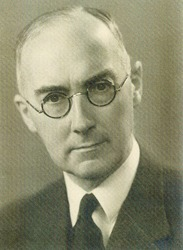
Johannes Hendrik Kramers

Johannes Hendrik Kramers (26 February 1891 in Rotterdam – 17 December 1951 in Oegstgeest) was a Dutch scholar of Islamic studies and ottomanist.

== Sources ==
- Babinger, Franz (1952). "Johannes Hendrik Kramers (1891-1951)". Zeitschrift der Deutschen Morgenländischen Gesellschaft (in German). 102 (1): 10–13. JSTOR 43368841.
