= Évariste Lévi-Provençal =

French historian (1894–1956)

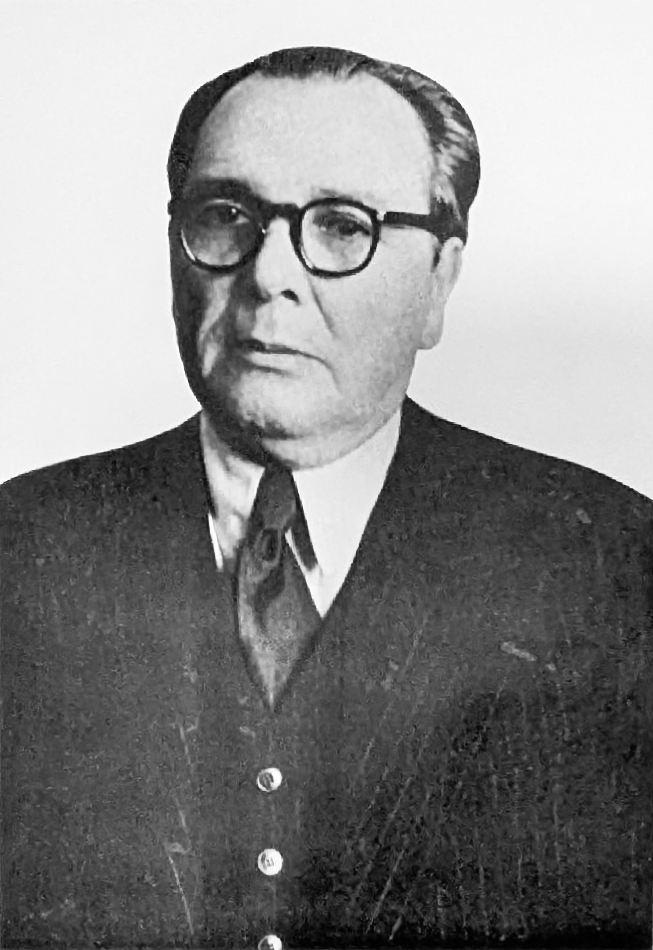
Évariste Lévi-Provençal

Évariste Lévi-Provençal (4 January 1894 – 27 March 1956) was a French medievalist, orientalist, Arabist, and historian of Islam.

The scholar who would take the name Lévi-Provençal was born 4 January 1894 in Constantine, French Algeria, as Makhlóuf Evariste Levi (Arabic: مخلوف إفاريست ليفي), his second name revealing that his North-African Jewish family was already somewhat Gallicized. By the age of nineteen when he published his first paper he had rechristened himself Évariste Lévi-Provençal. He studied at the Lycée in Constantine, and served in the French army during World War I, being wounded in the Dardanelles in 1917. He then joined the Institut des Hautes Etudes Marocaines. He held positions at the University of Algiers (1926) and later the Sorbonne (1945).

Lévi-Provençal was the founder of the French study of Islam and the first director of the Institute of Islamic Studies (Institut d'études islamiques) in Algiers. He specialized in the history of al-Andalus and the Muslims of Spain. He worked on editing and translating the Arabic sources for the medieval history of Spain, often with Spanish Arabist Emilio García Gómez. His writings about Muslims scholarship were both admiring and critical. He was anticolonial in his leanings, and he tended to ignore or underplay Jewish sources and obfuscate his own Jewish origins to avoid French antisemitism.

== Selected works ==
- Évariste Lévi-Provençal (1922). Les historiens des Chorfa: essai sur la littérature historique et biographique au Maroc du XVIe au XXe siècle. Larose.
- Séville musulmane au début du XII^{e} siècle
- L'Espagne musulmane au X^{e} siècle. Institutions et vie sociale (Paris, Maisonneuve & Larose, 1932)
- Histoire de l'Espagne musulmane, Paris, Maisonneuve & Larose, 1950
  - I : La Conquête et l'émirat hispano-umaiyade (710-912)
  - II : Le Califat umaiyade de Cordoue
  - III : Le Siècle du califat de Cordoue

== Sources ==
- Park, Thomas Kerlin and Aomar Boum, "Lévi-Provençal, Évariste", Historical dictionary of Morocco, 2016, pp. 309–10.
- Wasserstein, David, "Nota biographica: Makhlouf Levi and Evariste Lévi-Provençal", Al-Qanṭara, 21 (2000): 211–214.
