= Zubaidah bint Ja'far =

Abbasid princess and Harun al-Rashid's wife

Zubaidah bint Ja`far ibn al-Mansur زبيدة بنت جعفر بن المنصور
- Zawjat al khalifa

Consort of the Abbasid caliph
- Tenure: September 786 – 24 March 809
- Born: 765/66 al-Iraq, Abbasid Empire (now Iraq)
- Died: 10 July 831; Baghdad, Abbasid Empire
- Spouse: Harun al-Rashid
- Issue: Muhammad al-Amin
Names
- Umm Ja'far Zubaidah bint Ja`far ibn Abdallah al-Mansur
- Dynasty: Abbasid
- Father: Ja'far ibn Abdallah al-Mansur
- Mother: Salsal bint Atta
- Religion: Islam

Zubaidah bint Ja`far ibn al-Mansur (Arabic: زبيدة بنت جعفر بن المنصور) (died 26 Jumada I 216 AH / 10 July 831 CE) was the best known of the Abbasid princesses, and the wife and double cousin of Harun al-Rashid. She is particularly remembered for the series of wells, reservoirs and artificial pools that provided water for Muslim pilgrims along the route from Baghdad to Mecca and Medina, which was renamed the Darb Zubaidah in her honor. The exploits of her and her husband, Harun al-Rashid, form part of the basis for The Thousand and One Nights.

== Biography ==
Zubaidah's birthdate is unknown; it is known that she was at least a year younger than Harun. Her father, Ja'far was a brother of the Abbasid caliph al-Mahdi. Her mother, Salsal, was an elder sister of al-Khayzuran, second and most powerful wife of al-Mahdi, and mother of the future caliphs Musa al-Hadi and Harun al-Rashid.

Zubaidah is a pet name, given by her grandfather, caliph al-Mansur. The name means "little butter ball". Zubaidah's real name at birth was Sukhainah or Amat al-'Aziz". Later, Zubaidah got a kunya, Umm Ja'far (meaning Mother of Ja'far), which reflects her royal lineage as a granddaughter of caliph Abu Ja'far al-Mansur and a wife of caliph Abu Ja'far Harun al-Rashid.

She was the granddaughter of the Abbasid caliph Al-Mansur, through his son Ja'far, and cousin of al-Rashid (c.763 or 766–809), who she later married (Dhu al-Hijjah 165 AH/July 782 CE). The Abbasid caliph Muhammad al-Amin, who had a double royal lineage, was Zubaidah's son. Her stepson was 'Abdullah al-Ma'mun, who also became a caliph after the civil war with al-Amin.

It is said that Zubaidah's palace 'sounded like a beehive' because she employed one hundred women maids who had memorized the Qur'an.

On her fifth pilgrimage to Mecca she saw that a drought had devastated the population and reduced the Zamzam Well to a trickle of water. She ordered the well to be deepened and spent over 2 million dinars improving the water supply of Makkah and the surrounding province. "This included the construction of an aqueduct from the spring of Hunayn, 95 kilometers to the east, as well as the famed "Spring of Zubayda" on the plain of Arafat, one of the ritual locations on the Hajj. When her engineers cautioned her about the expense, never mind the technical difficulties, she replied that she was determined to carry out the work "were every stroke of a pickax to cost a dinar", according to Ibn Khallikan. "

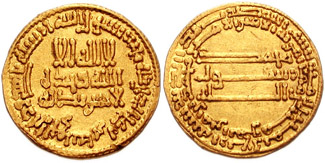
Gold Dinar of Harun al-Rashid mint in Baghdad Dated AH 184 (800 CE). "Second Symbol" (Quran 9: 33), Kalima in three lines across field / "Bismillah struck" in outer margin, "By order of the Heir Al-Amin, son of the Commander of the Faithful in inner margin, "Muhammad the messenger of Allah" in three lines across field.

In 792, Harun had Muhammad receive the oath of allegiance (bay'ah) with the name of al-Amīn ("The Trustworthy"), effectively marking him out as his main heir, while Abdallah was not named second heir, under the name al-Maʾmūn ("The Trusted One") until 799.

She also improved the pilgrim route across nine hundred miles of desert between Kufa and Mecca. The road was paved and cleared of boulders and she assembled water storages at intervals. The water tanks also caught the surplus rainwater from storms that occasionally drowned people. She ordered the construction of a series of aqueducts, later named for her, which provided water for pilgrims for over a thousand years. She had a qanat built which provided Mecca with water.

Ibn Battuta, referring to Zubaidah, states that "every reservoir, pool or well on this road which goes from Mecca to Baghdad is due to her munificient bounty...had it not been for her concern on behalf of this road, it would not be usable by anyone." He specifically mentions the water reservoirs at Birkat al-Marjum and al-Qarurah.

Zubaidah hired a staff of assistants to manage her properties and to act on her behalf in numerous business ventures, independent of Harun. Her private home was also administered in a luxurious manner. Her meals were presented on gold and silver plates instead of the simple leather tray commonly used at the time, and she introduced the fashion trend of wearing sandals stitched with gems. She was also carried on a palanquin made of silver, ebony, and lined with silk.

She built herself a palace with a large carpeted banquet hall supported by pillars made of ivory and gold. Verses of the Qur'an were engraved on the walls in gold letters. The palace was encircled by a garden full of uncommon animals and birds. She had a pet monkey attired as a cavalry soldier and hired 30 servants to attend to the monkey's needs. Zubaidah's visitors, including high-ranking generals, were required to kiss the monkey's hand. In addition, a slew of slave girls followed her everywhere she went and each knew the Qur'an by heart.

She rebuilt Tabriz after a disastrous earthquake in 791.

Her husband, Harun al-Rashid died in March 809 while at Tus. He was succeeded by Muhammad al-Amin. He continued the progressive policies of his father. The first two years of his reign were generally peaceful, however al-Amin tried to remove his half-brother as his heir. Which caused civil war. Her son was killed by al-Ma'mun's supporters in 813 and her son was succeeded by al-Ma'mun. Her stepson (also adopted son of Zubaidah) gave her the same respect and position as her son, al-Amin.

== Marriage ==
She was the first wife Harun al-Rashid. Harun and Zubaidah married in 781–82, at the residence of Muhammad bin Sulayman in Baghdad. She had one son. Muhammad, the future caliph al-Amin, was born in April 787.

Abdallah, the future al-Ma'mun, was born in Baghdad on the night of the 13 to 14 September 786 CE to Harun al-Rashid and his concubine Marajil, from Badghis. On the same night, which later became known as the "night of the three caliphs", his uncle al-Hadi died and was succeeded by al-Ma'mun's father, Harun al-Rashid, as ruler of the Abbasid Caliphate. Marajil died soon after his birth, and Abdallah was raised by Harun's wife, Zubaidah.

== Death ==
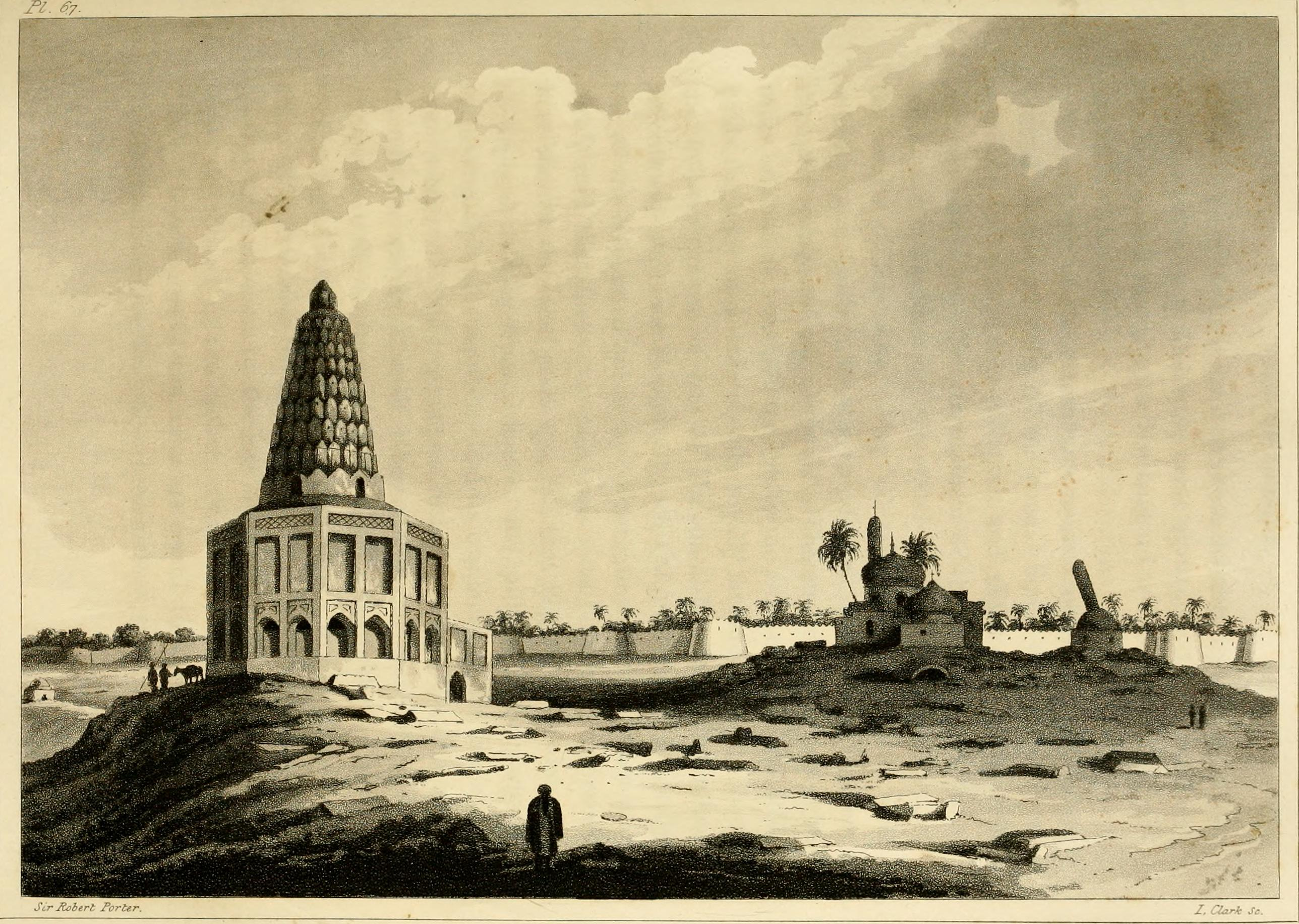
Tomb of Zobiede near Baghdad, as drawn by Robert Ker Porter, ca. 1818

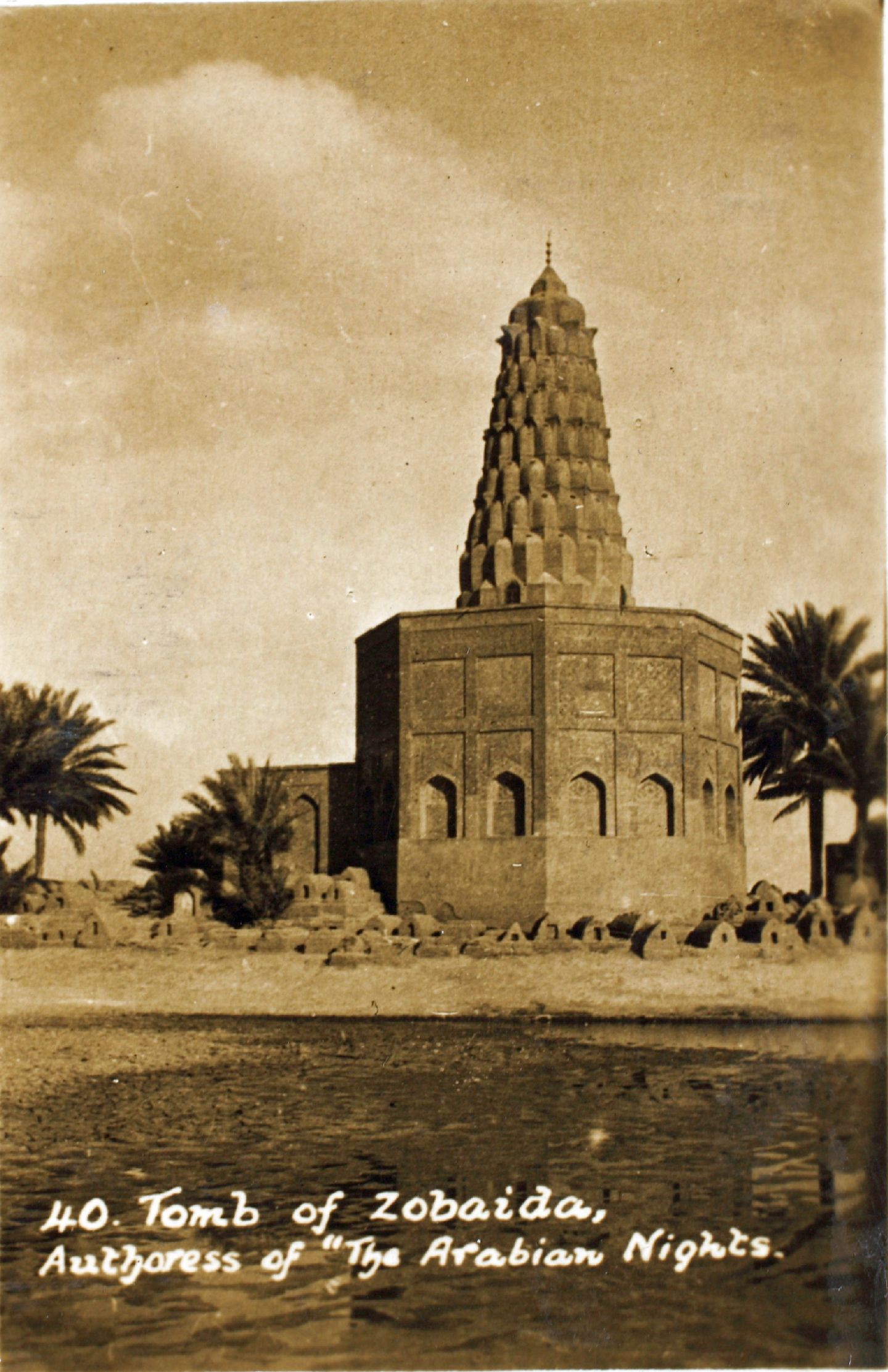
Photograph of Tomb of Zobiede, ca. 1920

Zubaidah died in 831, during the reign of her stepson al-Ma'mun.

== Caliphs related to her ==
Zubaidah was related and contemporary to several Abbasid caliphs, The first two Abbasid Caliphs were her grand uncle and grandfather respectively. She was also contemporary to ninth and tenth Abbasid caliphs, when they were young. The Caliphs who were related to her are:

No.	Caliph	Relation
1	Al-Saffah	Grand uncle
2	Al-Mansur	Grandfather
3	Al-Mahdi	Uncle and Father-in-law
4	Al-Hadi	Cousin
5	Harun al-Rashid	Husband
6	Al-Amin	Son
7	Al-Ma'mun	Step-sons
8	Al-Mu'tasim	Step-sons
9	Al-Wathiq	Step-grandsons
10	Al-Mutawakkil	Step-grandsons

== See also ==
- Lubabah bint Ja'far
- Lubana bint Ali ibn al-Mahdi

== Sources ==
- Gabrieli, F. (1960). "al-Amīn". In Gibb, H. A. R.; Kramers, J. H.; Lévi-Provençal, E.; Schacht, J.; Lewis, B. & Pellat, Ch. (eds.). The Encyclopaedia of Islam, Second Edition. Volume I: A–B. Leiden: E. J. Brill. pp. 437–438. doi:10.1163/1573-3912_islam_SIM_0599. OCLC 495469456.
- al-Tabari, Muhammad Ibn Yarir (1989). The History of al-Tabari Vol. 30: The 'Abbasid Caliphate in Equilibrium: The Caliphates of Musa al-Hadi and Harun al-Rashid A.D. 785-809/A.H. 169-193. Bibliotheca Persica. Translated by C. E. Bosworth. State University of New York Press. ISBN 978-0-88706-564-4.
- Abbott, Nabia (1946). Two Queens of Baghdad: Mother and Wife of Hārūn Al Rashīd. University of Chicago Press. ISBN 978-0-86356-031-6.
- Bosworth, C. E. (1995). "Rāfiʿ b. al- Layt̲h̲ b. Naṣr b. Sayyār". In Bosworth, C. E.; van Donzel, E.; Heinrichs, W. P. & Lecomte, G. (eds.). The Encyclopaedia of Islam, Second Edition. Volume VIII: Ned–Sam. Leiden: E. J. Brill. pp. 385–386. doi:10.1163/1573-3912_islam_SIM_6184. ISBN 978-90-04-09834-3.
- Rekaya, M. (1991). "al-Maʾmūn". In Bosworth, C. E.; van Donzel, E. & Pellat, Ch. (eds.). The Encyclopaedia of Islam, Second Edition. Volume VI: Mahk–Mid. Leiden: E. J. Brill. pp. 331–339. ISBN 978-90-04-08112-3.
- Bosworth, C. E. (1993). "al-Muʿtaṣim Bi'llāh". In Bosworth, C. E.; van Donzel, E.; Heinrichs, W. P. & Pellat, Ch. (eds.). The Encyclopaedia of Islam, Second Edition. Volume VII: Mif–Naz. Leiden: E. J. Brill. p. 776. ISBN 978-90-04-09419-2.
