= Al-Khayzuran =

Wife of the Abbasid caliph Al-Mahdi

Al-Khayzuran الخيزران
- Consort of the Abbasid caliph
- Born: Jorash, near modern Bisha, Saudi Arabia
- Died: 789; Madinat as-Salām, Baghdad
- Spouse: Al-Mahdi
- Children: Musa al-Hadi; Harun al-Rashid; see more
Names
- Al-Khayzuran bint Atta (Arabic: الخيزران بنت عطاء)
- Father: Atta
- Religion: Islam

Al-Khayzuran bint Atta (Arabic: الخيزران بنت عطاء, romanized: al-ḵayzurān bint ʿaṭāʾ) (died 789) was the wife of the Abbasid Caliph Al-Mahdi and mother of both Caliphs Al-Hadi and Harun al-Rashid. She maintained de facto influence from 775 to 789 during the reign of her husband and sons and is known for her immense influence on state affairs.

al-Khayzuran was not formally a ruler, but was nevertheless the first woman in the history of Islam to rule de facto and was the first woman in the history of Muslims to have gold coins in her name. She became one of the most powerful women of her time under the name of her husband and sons, al-Mahdi, al-Hadi and al-Harun. During the reign of al-Mahdi, al-Khayzuran often appeared at the court when the caliph was present and also used great political power, and caliph sought her views on most matters before issuing orders.

Al-Khayzuran was also the first woman to have her own bureaucracy and court and accept petitions and the audience of officials and the people, and to command and forbid in the caliphate. Independent of the state treasury, she gained enormous wealth by having extensive trade relations with other countries. While al-Mahdi spent most of his time hunting and having fun, she, by influencing the court, was able to hold meetings in her house to run the caliphate. Even after his death, she continued to wield premier power and influence during her sons' time.

At the time of al-Mahdi's untimely death, al-Khayzuran in the capital (Baghdad) had already taken over government affairs and by hiding his death and paying the salaries of army officers, she secured the allegiance of the soldiers for her son al-Hadi as the new caliph, but al-Hadi opposed his mother in sharing and partnership unquestionable power in the caliphate, and al-Khayzuran killed him after severe disputes. She brought Harun al-Rashid to power. Unlike his brother, al-Harun did not oppose his mother and officially handed over all power to his mother and relied upon his mother's advice.

== Life ==
Al-Khayzuran was born in Jorash, near modern Bisha, Saudi Arabia. She was kidnapped from her home by a Bedouin who then sold her in a slave market near Mecca to Al-Mahdi during his pilgrimage. Officially it was illegal for Muslims to enslave Muslims, however all sources are nevertheless adamant that she was a slave, and to break the official rule barring the enslavement of Muslims was not an unusual in practice in that context.

=== Reign of Al-Mahdi ===
Al-Khayzuran was described as beautiful, intelligent and gifted. At that time the woman slaves of the harem, called jarya or jawari, were famed for educating themselves in music, singing, astrology, mathematics and theology in order to keep their master's interest, and Al-Khayzuran took regular lessons in fiqh from the most learned qadis.

She eventually became the favorite of Al-Mahdi. Upon his succession as caliph in 775, she convinced him to free and marry her; depriving his first wife, Princess Rayta (daughter of Caliph Al-Saffah) of her privileges as well as demoting her son from the position of heir to the throne. Instead, Al-Mahdi name Al-Khayzuran's sons as his heirs, despite the fact that it went against custom for the sons of a slave to be so named. As a queen, al-Khayzuran now held supreme authority over the caliph's harem; even the caliph had to behave in this area according to her wishes. She quickly took over the management of this complex institution, from social life to the planning of parties and ceremonies, including the management of the large sums of money that come in.

From that point on, she was the most powerful and influential woman in the empire, accompanying Al-Mahdi whenever he held court. She was hidden behind a curtain, and if she did not agree with something, she would place her hand on his back out of sight. Al-Khayzuran had direct access to the caliph at all times: her suggestions were always adopted, individuals she recommended were favored and promoted, and at her intercession he forgave enemies or commuted death sentences.

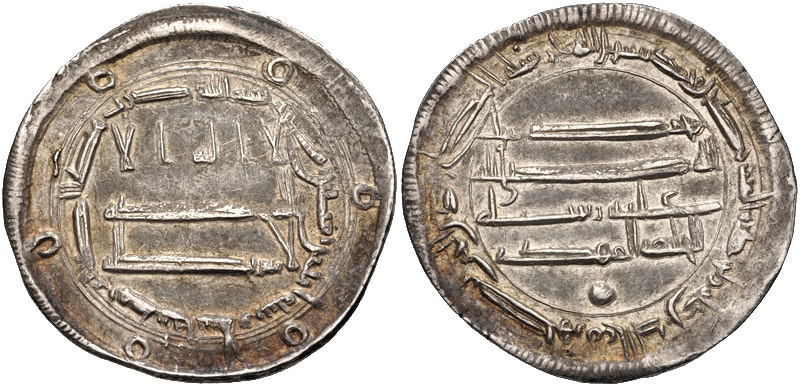
Silver dirham of Caliph al-Mahdi (r. 775–785), minted at Baghdad in 778/9

At court she was allied with the Barmakids. During Al-Mahdi's reign, Al-Khayzuran held an extraordinary and unusual degree of power for anyone, let alone a woman: she discussed and helped decide all military and state affairs, she was not secluded in the harem, her influence over al-Mahdi allowed her to exercise political power outside of the harem over everyone and anything or everywhere, she met petitioners, both men and women, who asked her for favors or to intercede on their behalf with her husband, the caliph. These petitioners included court officials, military officers, nobles, and merchants, and she had her own court where she held audiences with generals, politicians and officials in her chambers, mixing with men and discussing state affairs or they passed her petitions of the state in envelopes. Al-Mahdi even allowed her to meet with foreign ambassadors and sign official papers for the administration of the empire. All these measures were innovations considered culturally inappropriate for a woman, underscoring her influence and power throughout the empire.

Al-Khayzuran's palace, like the caliph's, was guarded by soldiers and her lands spread past the outskirts of the capital, and she also ran a number of enterprises and factories through agents who reported directly to her, she also had a large business abroad and the much merchants and nobles of the capital and its suburbs depended on her; she owned hundreds of slaves, had many female attendants, and commanded a luxurious lifestyle. Her annual income was one-third that of the caliphate, which amount doubled during the caliphates of her sons Al-Hadi and Harun al-Rashid, and accounted for more than half of the caliphate's total income. As her husband aged, her power at court grew, and she even awarded some of her relatives with positions. While al-Mahdi was campaigning in the west and north or he traveled to around the empire for sightseeing, she managed affairs in Baghdad on his behalf. She also summoned her mother, two sisters and two brothers to court, married her sister Salsal to Prince Ja'far, and named her brother Ghatrif Governor of Yemen.

In addition to their two sons the couple also had a daughter named Banuqa. Al-Mahdi loved her so much that he had her dressed as a boy, so she could accompany him on his travels. When she died at age 16, her father caused a scandal by demanding public condolences, which was not deemed correct for a daughter.

One time when Khaizuran was in her flat encircled by other imperial women, a servant notificed her that Muznah, the widow of Marwan II, the last Umayyad caliph, was at the door. Muznah was impoverished and her story and situation moved Khaizuran's heart so much that she arranged for her to be provided for. When Khaizuran and Mahdi had dinner together that evening, she notified him what had happened. Mahdi praised her charity, and Muznah enjoyed royal patronage until her death in subsequent reign.

Already during the Hajj of September 778, Mūsā had received from al-Mahdi the title of wali al-ʿahd (heir apparent), while Hārūn had been placed second in the order of succession. However, their mother Khayzurān did not so much favor the eldest son Mūsā, who had always been submissive to her will, as she did her second son Hārūn. This was the reason that prompted her to maneuver al-Mahdi, who had always yielded to her wishes, to have Mūsā excluded from the caliphate. While Mūsā could count on the support of the army (the “men of the sword”), Hārūn was instead favored by the bureaucracy (the “men of the pen” ), thanks also to the work carried out by his tutors, Yahyā b. Khālid al-Barmakī and al-Rabīʿ b. Yūnus; These two men were the most powerful politicians in the government during the late al-Mahdi reign and were closely associated with the Khayzurān. However, the fate of the future caliphate was not determined by al-Mahdi, who yielded to his wife’s insistence, but rather by his sudden death, which occurred in August 785.

=== Reign of Musa al-Hadi ===
In 785, Al-Mahdi died during an expedition with his son Harun, who rushed back to Baghdad to inform her. Her two sons were also absent from the city, and to secure the succession for her son, she called upon the viziers and ordered them to pay the wages of the army to secure order, and then had them swear allegiance to her son as their new Caliph in his absence.

Al-Khayzuran reportedly wished to continue to engage in politics during the reign of her son: "Khayzuran wanted to dominate her son as she had previously dominated his father, al-Mahdi." She continued to give audiences in her chambers and discuss state affairs during the reign of her son Al-Hadi:

"She continued to monopolize decision-making without consulting him [al-Hadi], Khayzuran in the first part of Hadi’s reign used to settle his affairs and to deal with him as she had dealt with his father before him in assuming absolute power to command and forbid. She in the first part of Hadi’s reign, behaved as she had before.... . During the reign of al-Mahdi people came and went through her door, and she settled the affairs of the state."

Al-Hadi, however, opposed her participation in state affairs, and he was not inclined to allow displays of authority by her and attempted to exclude her from them, reportedly saying: "it is not in the power of women to intervene .. . in matters of sovereignty. Look to your prayers and your prayer beads." He disapproved of the fact that his mother gave audiences to supplicants, politicians, officials and generals and conferred with them and thus mixed with men, which he considered improper, and he publicly addressed the issue of his mothers public life by assembling his generals and asked them:

'Who is the better among us, you or me?' asked Caliph al-Hadi of his audience.
'Obviously you are the better, Commander of the Faithful,' the assembly replied.
'And whose mother is the better, mine or yours?' continued the caliph.
'Your mother is the better, Commander of the Faithful.'
'Who among you', continued al-Hadi, 'would like to have men spreading news about your mother?'
'No one likes to have his mother talked about,' responded those present.
'Then why do men go to my mother to speak to her?'

Until this time period, Muslim women had not yet been fully secluded from society in a harem, but the harem system was to become fully institutionalized in the Islamic world under the Abbasid caliphate, when the Abbasid harem was established.

Despite his opposition, Al-Hadi did not manage to disturb his mother's extraordinary authority base, and she refused to retire from politics into the harem. The conflict was finally exposed in public when she interceded in favor of a supplicant, Abdallah ibn Malik, and publicly demanded a reply from her son, who lost his temper and openly yelled at her and said:

"Wait a moment and listen well to my words ... . Whoever from among my entourage - my generals, my servants - comes to you with a petition will have his head cut off and his property confiscated. What is the meaning of those retinues that throng around your door every day? Don't you have a spindle to keep you busy, a Koran for praying, a residence in which to hide from those besieging you? Watch yourself, and woe to you if you open your mouth in favour of anyone at all."

Al-Khayzuran is rumored to have had her eldest son Al-Hadi murdered after this incident. One reason given is that she learned that he was planning to kill his brother Harun al-Rashid, another that he attempted to poison her himself, which she discovered after first allowing her dog to eat of the dish he had sent to her. One version claims that she gave the task of killing him to one of his slave concubines, or jawari, to suffocate him with cushions.

=== Reign of Harun al-Rashid ===
Her second son, caliph Harun al-Rashid, in contrast to his brother, did not oppose to his mother participating in the affairs of state, but instead openly acknowledged her political ability and publicly trusted her advice, and governed the realm by her side. He was proud to point out that there was no reason for him to be ashamed of sharing his power with a woman, if she had such ability and brilliance as Al-Khayzuran.

Though it is difficult to say exactly in which issues she pressed her policy, it is nevertheless acknowledged that she participated in the decision making that formed the policy of the Caliphate. And at this time Al-Khayzuran retained all the powers of the empire and actually ruled instead of the caliph. She also legitimized her full-scale authority over her son by an old and popular saying "a mother's right is God's right".

"The histories do not detail Khayzuran's political achievements, but coins were struck in her name, palaces were named for her, and the cemetery in which subsequent Abbasid rulers were laid to rest carries her name, all testifying not only to status but also to civic largesse."

When she died in 789, her son broke the rules which demanded that he show no sorrow, and instead publicly demonstrated his sorrow and participated in her funeral, which attracted much attention.

== Family ==
Al-Khayzuran was the mother of caliphs Musa al-Hadi and Harun al-Rashid. She had another son named Isa, and a daughter named Banuqah or Banujah. She was born in Mecca and brought up in Jurash. She had two sisters, Salsal and Asma, and a brother Ghitrif. She was al-Mahdi's favourite wife.

In her parental home she had a brother named Ghitrif ibn Atta, two daughters of Ghitrif; Ubaidah and Azizah married Al-Khayzuran two son Musa and Harun respectively. Thus her two nieces became his daughter-in-laws too.

No.	Family member	Relation
1	Al-Mahdi	Husband
2	Musa al-Hadi	Son
3	Harun al-Rashid	Son
4	Isa ibn al-Mahdi	Youngest son
5	Banuqa bint al-Mahdi	Daughter
6	Lubabah bint Ja'far	Daughter-in-law
7	Ubaidah bint Ghitrif	Daughter-in-law
8	Zubaidah bint Ja'far	Daughter-in-law
9	Azizah bint Ghitrif	Daughter-in-law
10	Umm Muhammad	Daughter-in-law

== Legacy ==
Al-Khayzuran and her strong personality is believed by many literary historians to be a key influence on Scheherazade, the main character in One Thousand and One Nights. Many of the stories were influenced by Harun al-Rashid and his fabulous court.

Al-Khayzuran was the second and last woman in the caliphate's history, who was the mother of more than one caliph (mother of two caliphs). The first woman was Wallāda, who was the mother of both Umayyad caliphs; al-Walid I and Sulayman.

== See also ==
- Lubana bint Ali ibn al-Mahdi, was the wife of Abbasid Caliph Muhammad al-Amin.
- Umm Isa, Abbasid princess.

== Bibliography ==
- Ibn Kathir, Al Bidayah wa al-Nihayah
- Al-Thahbi, Sirat Alam al-nubala
- Al-Zarkali, Al-Alam
- Ahmad Khalil Juma, Nesaa min al-tarikh
- Verde, Tom. 2016. "Malik I: Khayzuran & Zubayda". Saudi Aramco World. January–February 2016. Vol. 67, no. 1, pages 42–45.
- Zaynab Husayan, Majaam Alam ak-nesaa
- Abbott, Nabia (1946). Two Queens of Baghdad: Mother and Wife of Hārūn Al Rashīd. University of Chicago Press. ISBN 978-0-86356-031-6.
