= Lubabah bint Ja'far =

Arab princess and First wife of Abbasid caliph Al-Hadi

Lubabah bint Ja'far لبابة بنت جعفر

Consort of the Abbasid caliph
- Tenure: 785 – 786
- Born: c. 760s Abbasid Caliphate
- Died: Baghdad, Abbasid Caliphate
- Spouse: Musa al-Hadi
Names
- Lubabah bint Ja'far ibn Abd Allah al-Mansur
- Dynasty: Abbasid
- Father: Ja'far ibn Abd Allah al-Mansur
- Religion: Islam

Lubābah bint Jaʿfar (Arabic: لبابة بنت جعفر) was an Abbasid princess, granddaughter of second Abbasid caliph al-Mansur, niece of third Abbasid caliph al-Mahdi and the principal wife of fourth Abbasid caliph al-Hadi.

Her full name was Lubabah bint Ja'far ibn Abd Allah al-Mansur. She was the daughter of prince Ja'far ibn Abd Allah also known as Jafar ibn al-Mansur. She was named Lubabah by her father and grandfather, the meaning of her name was innermost essence. She married al-Hadi, son of her uncle caliph al-Mahdi, and joined the Abbasid harem.

Al-Hadi had two wives. One was Lubabah bint Ja'far ibn al-Mansur. The second was Ubaydah, daughter of Ghitrif and, niece of al-Khayzuran. Her husband married her around 783 or 785. She was almost of same age as her husband. She became the influential wife of al-Hadi however, al-Hadi died after a short reign of fourteen months.

Lubabah had no children from her marriage. The children of her husband were Ja'far, Al-Abbas, Abd Allah, Ishaq, Isma'il, Sulayman and Musa. Of the two daughters, one was Umm Isa, who married al-Ma'mun, and the other was Umm al-Abbas, who was nicknamed Nunah. All of them were born of concubines. Lubabah didn't have her own children possibly due to her husband's early death in 786 at the age of 22. Very little is known about her after she became a widow. It is not known whether she remarried or not after him.

== Family ==
Lubabah was related to the Abbasid ruling House both paternally and at one point through marriage. She was contemporary to several Abbasid caliphs, Abbasid prince and Princesses. Lubabah had no children from her husband al-Hadi however, she had several step children.

No.	Abbasids	Relation
1	Al-Mansur	Grandfather
2	Al-Mahdi	Uncle and Father-in-law
3	Musa al-Hadi	Husband
4	Harun al-Rashid	Cousin and Brother-in-law
5	Ja'far ibn Abdallah al-Mansur	Father
6	Ja'far ibn Musa al-Hadi	Step-son
7	Al-Abbas ibn Musa al-Hadi	Step-son
8	Abdallah ibn Musa al-Hadi	Step-son
9	Ishaq ibn Musa al-Hadi	Step-son
10	Isma'il ibn Musa al-Hadi	Step-son
11	Sulayman ibn Musa al-Hadi	Step-son
12	Musa ibn Musa al-Hadi	Step-son
13	Umm Isa bint Musa al-Hadi	Step-daughter
14	Umm al-Abbas bint Musa al-Hadi	Step-daughter
15	Isa ibn Muhammad al-Mahdi	Cousin and Brother-in-law
16	Al-Khayzuran bint Atta	Paternal aunt and mother-in-law

== Sources ==
- Abbott, Nabia (1946). Two Queens of Baghdad: Mother and Wife of Hārūn Al Rashīd. University of Chicago Press. ISBN 978-0-86356-031-6.
- Bosworth, C. E., ed. (1989). The History of al-Ṭabarī, Volume XXX: The ʿAbbāsid Caliphate in Equilibrium: The Caliphates of Mūsā al-Hādī and Hārūn al-Rashīd, A.D. 785–809/A.H. 169–192. SUNY Series in Near Eastern Studies. Albany, New York: State University of New York Press. ISBN 978-0-88706-564-4.
- Al-Suyuti: History of the Caliphs
