= Ulayya bint al-Mahdi =

Abbasid princess, poet, and musician

Ulayya bint al-Mahdi عُلَيّة بنت المهدي
- Born: 777; Baghdad, Abbasid Empire
- Died: 825 (aged 47–48); Baghdad, Abbasid Empire
- Spouse: Musa ibn Isa ibn Musa al-Hashimi
- Children: Abbas; Ishaq
Names
- Ulayya bint Muhammad al-Mahdi ibn Abdallah al-Mansur
- Dynasty: Abbasid
- Father: al-Mahdi
- Mother: Maknuna
- Religion: Sunni Islam
- Occupation: Singer, composer, musician, Arabic poet

Ulayya bint al-Mahdi (Arabic: عُلَيّة بنت المهدي, romanized: ʿUlayya bint al-Mahdī, 777–825) was an Abbasid princess, noted for her legacy as a poet and musician.

== Biography ==
‘Ulayya was one of the daughters of the third Abbasid Caliph al-Mahdi (r. 775–85), who reigned from 775 to his death in 785, and was noted for promoting poetry and music in his realm. Her mother was a singer (qiyan) and slave concubine of the Abbasid harem called Maknūna (herself the jāriya of one al-Marwānīya). Maknunah was a songstress. She was owned by Al-Marwaniyyah. Al-Mahdi, while yet a prince, bought her for 100,000 silver dirhams. She found such favor with the prince that Al-Khayzuran (Al-Mahdi's wife) used to say, "No other woman of his made my position so difficult."

It appears that, with her father dying early in her life, ‘Ulayya was brought up by her half-brother Harun al-Rashid (r. 786–809).

‘Ulayya was a princess, and, like her half-brother Ibrahim ibn al-Mahdi (779–839), a noted musician, and poet. It has been claimed that she surpassed her brother in skills and while 'not the only princess known to have composed poetry and songs', nonetheless 'the most gifted'. 'Much of her poetry consists of short pieces designed to be sung; in the muḥdath style, it treats of love, friendship and longing for home, but also includes praise of Hārūn, the caliph, celebration of wine and sharp attacks on enemies.'

The main source for ‘Ulayya's life is the tenth-century Kitāb al-Aghānī of Abū ’l-Faraj al-Iṣfahānī. This and other sources tend to portray ‘Ulayya as an accomplished woman who could readily hold her own in court society, but who tended to shy from too prominent a role in public life. She was wealthy and clearly possessed slave-girls, and had an intimate relationship with her powerful brothers; although there is little evidence of her communing with religious scholars, 'various reports in ‘Ulayya's tarājim refer to her piety and adherence to ritual obligations'.

Similar to other free Arab women known for their musical ability, Ulayya bint al-Mahdi only performed in private, chaperoned family only functions to avoid any potential impropriety, such as to be compared to the slave-qiyan, jawaris or mughanniyat, but she was referred to as a qayna as a tribute to her musical ability. She once performed a duet with her brother Ibrahim ibn al-Mahdi. She also composed love poems for her sister-in-law Zubaidah bint Ja`far, which was allegedly performed by 2000 slave women singers for her brother Harun al-Rashid.

Her husband Musa died before her, Various dates are given for Musa's death, including 799 (at the age of 55), 803, and 805. Ulayya spend her life after becoming widow with her brothers and nephews. Ulayya died in 824 or 825.

== Siblings ==
Ulayya was related to Abbasid house both by birth and through marriage like all other Abbasid princess. She was contemporary and related to several Abbasid caliphs, princes and princesses.

No.	Abbasids	Relation
1	Musa al-Hadi	Half-brother
2	Harun al-Rashid	Half-brother
3	Abbasa bint al-Mahdi	Half-sister
4	Ubaydallah ibn al-Mahdi	Half-brother
5	Ali ibn al-Mahdi	Half-brother
6	Aliyah bint al-Mahdi	Half-sister
7	Mansur ibn al-Mahdi	Half-brother
8	Abdallah ibn al-Mahdi	Half-brother
9	Ibrahim ibn al-Mahdi	Half-brother
10	Banuqa bint al-Mahdi	Half-sister
11	Isa ibn al-Mahdi	Half-brother

== Marriage ==
Ulayya married Musa ibn Isa, a prominent member of a cadet branch of the Abbasid dynasty. He had an extended relation with the Abbasid dynasty, as a great-nephew of its first two caliphs al-Saffah (r. 750–754) and al-Mansur (r. 754–775).

== Poetry ==
As example of ‘Ulayya's poetry is:

I held back my love's name and kept repeating it to myself.
Oh how I long for an empty space to call out the name I love.

=== Legends about her poetry ===
Ulayya was married to an Abbāsid prince, but 'love-poems of her addressed to two slaves have been preserved'. One of the best known anecdotes about her concerns her relationship with a member of al-Rashīd's palace staff, a khādim named Ṭall, with whom she would correspond in verse. When al-Rashīd forbids her from uttering his name, she follows his order to the letter even when it precludes her from uttering a line of Sūrat al-Baqara in which the term ṭall occurs. When the caliph learns of this, he is swayed and presents Ṭall to her as a gift. In this case, her piety become the means to winning a quite worldly reward.

== Editions ==
- al-Ṣūlī, Abū Bakr, Ash‘ār awlād al-khulafā’ wa-akhbāruhum, ed. by James Heyworth-Dunne, 3rd ed. (Beirut: Dār al-Masīra, 1401/1982), pp. 64–76.
