= Al-Hadi =

4th Abbasid caliph (r. 785–786)

al-Hadi الهادي
- Khalifah; Amir al-Mu'minin
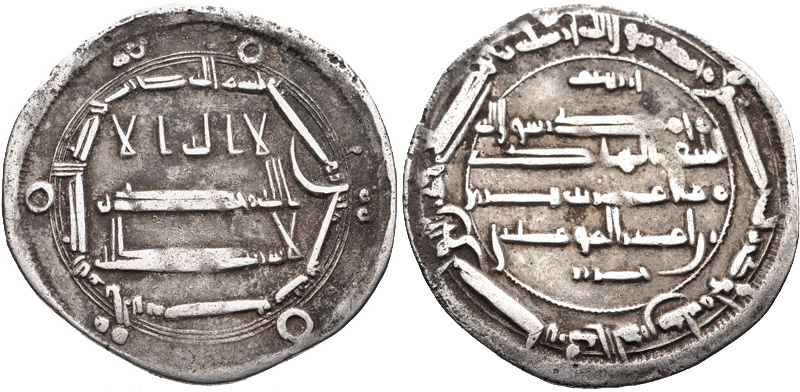
- Dirham of al-Hadi minted in 786/787 in al-Haruniya

4th Caliph of the Abbasid Caliphate
- Reign: August 785 – 14 September 786
- Predecessor: al-Mahdi
- Successor: Harun al-Rashid
- Born: 759 or 762; Rayy, Abbasid Caliphate (in present-day Tehran Province)
- Died: 14 September 786 (aged 24-27); Baghdad, Abbasid Caliphate
- Burial: Haditha
- Consort: Lubabah bint Ja'far; Ubaydah bint Ghitrif; Ghadir; Rahim; Hilanah
- Issue: Ja'far; al-Abbas; Abd Allah; Ishaq; Isma'il; Sulayman; Musa; Umm Isa; Umm al-Abbas
- Dynasty: Abbasid
- Father: al-Mahdi
- Mother: al-Khayzuran
- Religion: Sunni Islam

Abū Muḥammad Mūsā ibn al-Mahdī al-Hādī (Arabic: أبو محمد موسى بن المهدي الهادي; 759/762 – 14 September 786 CE) better known by his laqab al-Hādī (الهادي) was the fourth Abbasid caliph who succeeded his father al-Mahdi and ruled from 169 AH (785 CE) until his death in 170 AH (786 CE). His short reign ended with internal chaos and power struggles with his mother.

== Early life ==
Al-Hadi was born in 759 or 762 (Note: He was 4 years old when Harun al-Rashid was born in 763/766.) as the eldest son of al-Mahdi and al-Khayzuran bint Atta. He had three full-siblings; Harun, Isa, and a sister Banuqah (or Banujah). His mother was born in Mecca and brought up in Jurash. She had two sisters, Salsal bint Atta and Asma bint Atta, and a brother Ghitrif ibn Atta. She was al-Mahdi's favorite wife, and he consulted her on matters of defense and administration. Officers and clerics approached her to get favors from the caliph, and petitioners regularly gathered outside her residence. Her influence in public and political life increased gradually from interferer and decisive incursions during her husband's reign to more powerful and wider ones during the reigns of her two sons. Al-Hadi also had an elder-half sister Abbasa, two other half-sisters Ulayya and Aliyah, and several half-brothers; Ubaydallah, Ibrahim, Mansur, Ali, and Abdallah.

Al-Hadi was appointed as the first crown prince by his father at the age of 16 and was chosen as the leader of the army. Prior to his death, al-Mahdi supposedly favored his second son Harun as his successor, taking him on multiple military expeditions in 779 and 781 to train him to be the next caliph, as his own father prepared him, but died before the formal transfer of the crown prince title could occur. In addition, based on her actions during al-Hadi's rule, Khayzuran might have also played a role in this. Alternatively, al-Rashid was a general and may have accompanied his father to war in this role.

His father, Al-Mahdi give military commands to al-Hadi in 167 AH / 783-784 CE. Caliph al-Mahdi sent his heir apparent Musa al-Hadi and Yazid ibn Mazyad al-Shaybani to Tabaristan. In 168/784–785, the new army was reinforced by Sa'id al-Harishi with 40,000 soldiers. Yazid al-Shaybani defeated Wandad Hurmuzd in a decisive battle in which Wandad Hurmuzd himself was wounded. The large number of Abbasid troops and Yazid al-Shaybani's military capability compelled Wandad Hurmuzd to surrender to Musa in Gorgan, on the condition of a pardon that his influence in Tabaristan would not be harmed. In return, he pledged to cease stirring up disturbances and attacking Abbasid garrisons. Musa al-Hadi took Wandad Hurmuzd with him to Baghdad, but al-Hadi delayed his return to Baghdad after he heard of the conspiracies being woven against him to remove him from the succession and transfer it to his brother Harun al-Rashid. al-Hadi did not return to Baghdad until he heard of his father al-Mahdi's death, whereupon he was proclaimed Caliph of the Muslims.

== Caliphate ==
In August 785, Al-Mahdi died unexpectedly during an expedition with his son Harun, who rushed back to Baghdad to inform his mother. To secure the succession for her son al-Hadi, who was not in the capital, she called the viziers and had them pay the army wages to secure order, and swear allegiance to al-Hadi as caliph in his absence. She held control until al-Hadi returned to Baghdad, and ascended to the throne, with his brother Harun al-Rashid becoming his crown prince. This was a point of contention for al-Hadi as he spent the majority of his rule attempting to wrest the title of crown prince from Harun and install his young son Ja'far in his place. al-Hadi's attempts to convince Harun to resign from his title lead to the latter leaving the capital, and not returning till al-Hadi's death. al-Hadi's attempts also created conflict between him and his mother Khayzuran, who was in favor of Harun being the successor.

Al-Hadi was considered an "enlightened ruler" by his constituents and continued the "progressive" moves of his Abbasids predecessor. Like his father he was very open to the people of his empire and allowed citizens to visit him in the palace at Baghdad to address him. He was physically strong and famous for his bravery and talent in government and generosity. However, he was cruel, daring and zealous. Al-Hadi was especially malevolent to non-Muslim citizens, as he continued his father's persecutions and quashed multiple internal uprisings. He crushed a Kharijite rebellion, repelled a Byzantine invasion and seized some territory in the process.

Al-Hadi appointed Umar ibn Abd al-Aziz ibn Abdallah as governor of Medina in 785 and he remained in office (785–786) throughout al-Hadi's reign.

Also during his reign, al-Hadi appointed his paternal uncle Sulayman ibn Abi Ja'far as the Amir al-Hajj to led the Hajj pilgrimage to Mecca.

Al-Hadi was also notorious for his cruelty and persecution of the Alids and the Shia, He imposed further restrictions on them and the remaining descendants of the Umayyad dynasty, and treated them cruelly. He cut all the allowances al-Mahdi previously assigned them due to fear of an Alid uprising. He ordered his agents to watch all Alid activities and place some spies among them and ordered them to register their presence daily with local authority. In 786, the Alids of Hijaz led by Al-Husayn ibn Ali staged an uprising in response to these conditions. They gained control of Medina, released prisoners, imprisoned Abbasid agents, and made the Prophet's Mosque their command center. Then, they set out to Mecca, were denied entry by its people, and were forced to confront the Abbasid army led by al-Hadi in the valley of Fakhkh. There, Al-Husayn and his companions were defeated and killed at the Battle of Fakhkh. This event became famous, and he became known as Shahid Fakhkh (the martyr of Fakhkh). However, Al-Husayn's cousin, Idris ibn Abdallah, escaped to Morocco aided by Wadih, an Egyptian postal manager. After the event of Fakhkh, al-Hadi accused the Alid Musa ibn Ja'far, one of his brother's advocates, of provoking the revolutionaries. He arrested the Alid and sentenced him to execution, but died before he could implement his decision.

There was no wanting for internal conflicts as well. At al-Mahdi's untimely death, Al-Khayzuran, his mother, reportedly wished to continue to engage in politics as she had become accustomed to during al-Mahdi's reign: "Khayzuran wanted to dominate her son. She continued to give audiences in her chambers and discuss state affairs:

"She continued to monopolize decision-making without consulting him (al-Hadi), she behaved as she had before, during the reign of al-Mahdi, people came and went through her door. She used to exercise her authority over him in all his affairs without consulting him at all, assuming sole control over matters of ordaining and forbidding, just as she had done previously with his father."

In the first months of al-Hadi's short reign as caliph, he allowed his mother to implement the same political freedoms his father allowed and al-Hadi was in full submission to his mother, Khayzuran. He responded positively to all the requests and demands coming to her, and when she talked to officials and other audiences and made decisions and only reported her decisions to him, he did not object and approved them. Al-Khayzuran took advantage of the fact that al-Hadi never rejected her personal request, and disguised her friends desires and the supplicants who come to her as her own in order to obtain what they wanted. It eventually came to the point in which petitioners lined up at Khayzuran's gate in order to attain their own goals and even letters from all the provinces were sent to her court to report the affairs to her and ask her for favors for themselves, and al- Hadi heard of how his officers and governors used to go to his mother Khayzuran in hopes that what they wanted from him would be done through her words. However, al-Hadi, began to oppose her participation in state affairs; he felt she overreached, and over time he retaliated against his mother's political power. He was not inclined to allow her displays of authority and attempted to exclude her from politics. After a serious incident, he told her:

"Do not overstep the essential limits of womanly modesty and overdo in person the role of the generous donor. It is not dignified for women to enter upon affairs of state. It is not in the power of women to intervene ... in matters of sovereignty. Look to your prayers and your prayer beads."

The harem system first became fully institutionalized in the Islamic World under the Abbasid caliphate, when the Abbasid harem was established. At this point, however, Muslim women had not yet been fully secluded from society in a harem.

The growing seclusion of women and decline of women's rights that would permeate the Abbasid Caliphate and the region's latter nations were illustrated by the power struggle between the Caliph al-Hadi and his mother al-Khayzuran, who refused to live in seclusion but instead challenged the power of the Caliph by giving her own audiences to male supplicants and officials and thus mixing with men. Her son considered this improper, and he publicly addressed the issue of his mothers public life by assembling his generals and asked them:

'Who is the better among us, you or me?' asked Caliph al-Hadi of his audience.
'Obviously you are the better, Commander of the Faithful,' the assembly replied.
'And whose mother is the better, mine or yours?' continued the caliph.
'Your mother is the better, Commander of the Faithful.'
'Who among you', continued al-Hadi, 'would like to have men spreading news about your mother?'
'No one likes to have his mother talked about,' responded those present.
'Then why do men go to my mother to speak to her?'

Al-Khayzuran would not be oppressed or silenced, much to al-Hadi's chagrin. The conflict was finally exposed in public when she interceded in favor of a supplicant, Abdallah ibn Malik, and publicly demanded a reply from her son, who lost his temper and openly yelled at her and they both discussed:

Khayzuran: You must meet my request.

al-Hadi: I will not do it.

Khayzuran: I already assured the chief of police that it will be done.

al-Hadi: He is a son of a harlot. I will not do it for him.

Khayzuran: Then I will never ask you for any more favours.

al-Hadi: I do not care.

al-Hadi continued:"Wait a moment and listen well to my words.. Whoever from among my entourage - my generals, my servants - comes to you with a petition will have his head cut off and his property confiscated. What is the meaning of those retinues that throng around your door every day? Don't you have a spindle to keep you busy, a Koran for praying, a residence in which to hide from those besieging you? Watch yourself, and woe to you if you open your mouth in favour of anyone at all."

Khayzuran departed in absolute anger, and never had any words with him again, sweet or bitter. This situation between the royal mother and her son was never resolved and it remained an open wound. Al-Tabari says others refer to al-Hadi's overtures to Harun. One account al-Tabari cites has al-Hadi attempting to poison his mother:

"Yahya b. al-Hasan related that his father transmitted the information to him, saying: I heard Kalisah telling al-'Abbas b. al-Fadl b. al-Rabi that Musa sent to his mother al-Khayzuran a dish of rice, saying, "I found this tasty and accordingly ate some of it, so you have some too!" Khalisah related: But I said to her, "Don't touch it until you investigate further, for I am afraid that it might contain something to your detriment." So they brought in a dog; it ate some and fell down dead. Musa sent to al-Khayzuran afterwards and said, "How did you like the dish of rice?" She replied, "I enjoyed it very much." He said, "You can't have eaten it, because if you had, I would have been rid of you. When was any Caliph happy who had a mother (still alive)?" (v. 30 pp. 43–44)

Al-Hadi moved his capital from Baghdad to Haditha shortly before his death.

== Family ==
Al-Hadi had two wives. One was Lubabah, the daughter of Ja'far, son of Caliph al-Mansur. The second was Ubaidah, daughter of Ghitrif ibn Atta and thus the niece of Al-Khayzuran bint Atta (Ghitrif ibn Atta's sister). One of his concubines was Ghadir also known as Amat-al-Aziz, who had belonged to Rabi ibn Yunus, the powerful and ambitious chamberlain of caliphs al-Mansur and al-Mahdi. She was first presented to al-Mahdi, who, inturn presented her to al-Hadi. She was his favourite concubine, and bore him his two oldest sons. After al-Hadi's death Harun al-Rashid married her. Another concubine was Rahim, who was the mother of his son, Ja'far. Another concubine was Hilanah. After al-Hadi's death, she became a concubine of his brother Harun al-Rashid. His other sons were al-Abbas, Abdallah, Ishaq, Isma'il, Sulayman and Musa. Of the two daughters, one was Umm Isa, who married Caliph al-Mamun, and the other was Umm al-Abbas, who was nicknamed Nunah. All of them were born of concubines. His two sons, Isma'il and Ja'far married Harun-Rashid's daughters, Hamdunah and Fatimah respectively.

== Policies and events ==
=== Military and Defence policies ===
His short reign was fraught with numerous military conflicts. The revolt of Husayn ibn Ali ibn Hasan broke out when Husayn declared himself caliph in Medina.

Shortly after caliph al-Mahdi died, Husayn and his followers rose in revolt at Medina, hoping to take advantage of the as yet unstable position of al-Mahdi's successor, al-Hadi. Probably on 16 May 786, Husayn and his fellow conspirators tried to seize control of Medina. At the Mosque of the Prophet, Husayn took the pulpit, symbolically dressed in white and wearing a white turban, and received the allegiance of is followers, with the laqab of al-Murtaḍā min Āl Muḥammad, 'the One pleasing to God from the house of Muhammad'.

The rebels failed to rally the ordinary people to their cause, however, and were quickly confronted by the local garrison. Over the following days, the partisans of the Alids (al-Mubayyiḍa, the 'wearers of white') and the Abbasids (al-Musawwida, the 'wearers of black') clashed repeatedly, but the latter emerged victorious, confining the Alids and their partisans to the precinct of the Great Mosque. With his uprising clearly a failure, Husayn left the city for Mecca on 28 May, with some 300 followers.

On 11 June 786, at the wadi of Fakhkh, some 4 kilometres (2.5 mi) northwest of Mecca, Husayn's small force encountered the Abbasid army, under the command of a number of Abbasid princes who had been present in the city with their armed retinues for the Hajj. In the ensuing battle, Husayn and over a hundred of his followers were killed, and many taken prisoner. Many Alids managed to escape the battle by mingling with the Hajj pilgrims. Among them were Idris and Yahya, the brothers of Muhammad al-Nafs al-Zakiyya.

Al-Hadi crushed the rebellion and killed Husayn and many of his followers but Idris bin Abdallah, a cousin of Husayn, escaped and aided by Wadih, the Egyptian postal manager, reached coastal Maghreb. where he later founded the Idrisi state in 788.

Al-Hadi also crushed a Kharijite rebellion and repelled a Byzantine invasion. The Abbasid armies actually seized some territory from the latter.

=== Administration policy and Succession plan ===
After al-Hadi's accession, Yahya ibn Khalid was confirmed in his position, but soon became involved in the struggle for the succession. Al-Hadi, now caliph, wanted to remove his brother from the succession and appoint his own son, Ja'far, instead. Harun himself appeared to be ready to acquiesce to this demotion, but this threatened Yahya's own position, which was dependent on Harun's status as heir-apparent. Consequently, along with al-Rabi ibn Yunus and the influential and powerful queen-mother al-Khayzuran, he tried to uphold Harun's position. At this time, al-Khayzuran was the most powerful person in the Caliph's family, and al-Hadi hated this immense authority of his mother. Unlike al-Khayzuran, who did not hide her hostility to her older son, Yahya tried to mediate between the two brothers, urging Harun to a firmer defence of his rights, and al-Hadi to a more conciliatory stance. The rivalry between the two brothers was also the expression of a wider conflict, between a military faction, favoured by al-Hadi, and a courtly/bureaucratic faction, that rallied behind the Barmakids and al-Rabi ibn Yunus, with Harun as their candidate. The former clung to the traditional prerogatives of the troops that had brought the Abbasids to power, especially in the role of military leaders as provincial governors, while the newly emerging class of civil administrators (the kuttāb) and palace officials desired both a greater share of power as well as a centralization of authority in the central government and its civil departments.

In the end, in September 786, matters came to a head: Yahya was imprisoned and was about to be executed, but on the same night, al-Hadi was found dead. The exact cause of al-Hadi's death is unknown, but some sources imply that al-Khayzuran was responsible.

=== Religious policy ===
Al-Hadi continued to follow his father's policy. His father, Al-Mahdi had two important religious policies: the persecution of the zanadiqa, or dualists, and the declaration of orthodoxy. His father Al-Mahdi had declared that the caliph had the ability, and indeed the responsibility, to define the orthodox theology of Muslims to protect the umma against heresy.

His father, Al-Mahdi ordered the composition of polemical works to refute freethinkers and other heretics, and for years he tried to exterminate them absolutely, hunting them down and exterminating freethinkers in large numbers, putting to death anyone on mere suspicion of being a zindiq. As a direct successor of al-Mahdi, al-Hadi completely followed this policy and his successor and brother Harun al-Rashid, continued the pogroms, although with diminished intensity during the reign of the latter and was later abolished by him.

== Death and succession ==
Al-Hadi died in Baghdad in September 786, after ruling for over an year. His brother, Harun al-Rashid, performed his funeral prayer. He was buried in 'Isa Abad. Al-Tabari notes varying accounts of this death, including an abdominal ulcer or assassination prompted by al-Hadi's own mother. According to a note in the SUNY translation of al-Tabari, the Kitab al-'Uyun reports that al-Khayzuran feared al-Hadi would recover from his illness and therefore had slave girls suffocate him. The note further observes that al-Tabari records al-Hadi's assertion of independence from his mother, his prohibition of her involvement in public affairs, and his threats to Harun's succession, concluding that "his death appears as too opportune for so many people concerned that it should have been a natural one." The famous Muslim historian Ibn Khaldun discredited this claim, however.

The historian al-Tabari notes varying accounts of al-Hadi's death, e.g. an abdominal ulcer or assassination prompted by al-Hadi's own mother.

Al-Hadi was succeeded by his younger brother, Harun al-Rashid. Upon his accession, Harun led Friday prayers in Baghdad's Great Mosque and then sat publicly as officials and the layman alike lined up to swear allegiance and declare their happiness at his ascent to Amir al-Mu'minin. He began his reign by appointing very able ministers, who carried on the work of the government so well that they greatly improved the condition of the people.

== See also ==
- Al-Fadl ibn Salih
- Ibrahim ibn Salih, brother-in-law of al-Hadi

== Bibliography ==
- Bosworth, C. E., ed. (1989). The History of al-Ṭabarī, Volume XXX: The ʿAbbāsid Caliphate in Equilibrium: The Caliphates of Mūsā al-Hādī and Hārūn al-Rashīd, A.D. 785–809/A.H. 169–192. SUNY Series in Near Eastern Studies. Albany, New York: State University of New York Press. ISBN 978-0-88706-564-4.
- Abbott, Nabia (1946). Two Queens of Baghdad: Mother and Wife of Hārūn Al Rashīd. University of Chicago Press.
- Bobrick, Benson (2012). The Caliph's Splendor: Islam and the West in the Golden Age of Baghdad. Simon & Schuster. ISBN 978-1416567622.
- Turner, John P. (2016). "Fakhkh". In Fleet, Kate; Krämer, Gudrun; Matringe, Denis; Nawas, John; Rowson, Everett (eds.). Encyclopaedia of Islam (3rd ed.). Brill Online. doi:10.1163/1573-3912_ei3_COM_26920. ISSN 1873-9830.
- Veccia Vaglieri, L. (1971). "al-Ḥusayn b. ʿAlī, Ṣāḥib Fak̲h̲k̲h̲". In Lewis, B.; Ménage, V. L.; Pellat, Ch. & Schacht, J. (eds.). The Encyclopaedia of Islam, Second Edition. Volume III: H–Iram. Leiden: E. J. Brill. pp. 615–617. doi:10.1163/1573-3912_islam_SIM_2979. OCLC 495469525.
- Eustache, D. (1971). "Idrīs I". In Lewis, B.; Ménage, V. L.; Pellat, Ch. & Schacht, J. (eds.). The Encyclopaedia of Islam, Second Edition. Volume III: H–Iram. Leiden: E. J. Brill. p. 1031. doi:10.1163/1573-3912_islam_SIM_3492. OCLC 495469525.
- Madelung, W. (1975). "The Minor Dynasties of Northern Iran". In Frye, R. N. (ed.). The Cambridge History of Iran, Volume 4: From the Arab Invasion to the Saljuqs. Cambridge: Cambridge University Press. pp. 198–249. ISBN 978-0-521-20093-6.
- Malek, Hodge M. (2004). The Dābūyid Ispahbads and Early 'Abbāsid Governors of Tabaristān: History and Numismatics. Royal Numismatic Society. ISBN 978-0-901405-83-8.
- Omar, Farouk (2009). الخلافة العباسية: عصر القوة والازدهار [The Abbasid Caliphate: The Era of Power and Prosperity] (in Arabic). Vol. 1. Dar Shorouq.
- Kennedy, Hugh (2004) [1986]. The Prophet and the Age of the Caliphates: The Islamic Near East from the 6th to the 11th Century (Second ed.). Harlow: Longman. ISBN 978-0-582-40525-7.
- Kennedy, Hugh (2006). When Baghdad Ruled the Muslim World: The Rise and Fall of Islam's Greatest Dynasty. Cambridge, Massachusetts: Da Capo Press. ISBN 978-0-306814808.
- Barthold, W. & Sourdel, D. (1960). "al-Barāmika". In Gibb, H. A. R.; Kramers, J. H.; Lévi-Provençal, E.; Schacht, J.; Lewis, B. & Pellat, Ch. (eds.). The Encyclopaedia of Islam, Second Edition. Volume I: A–B. Leiden: E. J. Brill. pp. 1033–1036. doi:10.1163/1573-3912_islam_COM_0099. OCLC 495469456.
- Yarshater, Ehsan, ed. (1985–2007). The History of al-Ṭabarī (40 vols). SUNY Series in Near Eastern Studies. Albany, New York: State University of New York Press. ISBN 978-0-7914-7249-1.
- Omar, Farouk (1967). The 'Abbasid Caliphate, 132/750-170/786. SAOS University of London.

al-Hadi Abbasid dynasty Cadet branch of the Banu Hashim Born: 26 April 764 Died: 786
Sunni Islam titles
Preceded by al-Mahdi	Caliph of the Abbasid Caliphate; 785–786	Succeeded by Harun al-Rashid
