= Lubana bint Ali ibn al-Mahdi =

Wife of Abbasid caliph Al-Amin and Arabic poet

Lubana bint Ali ibn al-Mahdi لبانة بنت علي بن المهدي

Consort of the Abbasid caliph
- Tenure: 24 March 809 – 27 September 813
- Born: c. 787/789; Baghdad, Abbasid Caliphate
- Died: Baghdad, Abbasid Caliphate
- Burial: Baghdad
- Spouse: Al-Amin
Names
- Lubana bint Ali ibn al-Mahdi ibn Abdallah al-Mansur
- House: Abbasid
- Father: Ali ibn al-Mahdi
- Religion: Islam

Lubāna bint ʿAlī ibn al-Mahdī (Arabic: لبانة بنت علي بن المهدي) was an Abbasid princess, Arabic poet and the principal wife of caliph al-Amin. She was the daughter of Ali, a son of the third Abbasid caliph, al-Mahdi.

== Ancestry ==
Her grandfather was al-Mahdi and her grandmother was Abbasid princess Raitah bint al-Saffah. She was the niece of Caliphs Musa al-Hadi and Harun al-Rashid.

Her grandfather al-Mahdi married Raitah as his first wife after his return from Khurasan. She was the daughter of Caliph as-Saffah and his wife Umm Salamah, a Makhzumite. She gave birth to two sons, Ubaydallah and Ali ibn al-Mahdi.

== Biography ==
Lubana was the daughter of Abbasid prince Ali ibn al-Mahdi and granddaughter of al-Mahdi. During the ending years of Harun al-Rashid's long reign many marriages took place between different members of Abbasid dynasty. Al-Amin is recorded as having two wives, Arib bint al-Ma'muniyyah, and Lubana bint Ali ibn al-Mahdi was noted for her exceptional beauty. Lubana was the member of influential Abbasid dynasty. She married Al-Amin when she was seventeen or eighteen years old. This marriage was political important for Al-Amin because his half brother had married Umm Isa daughter of Caliph Al-Hadi. She was respected by her mother-in-law Zubaidah bint Ja'far. Lubana was also an Arabic poet.

However, Al-Amin died before the consummation of his marriage to Lubanah; her attested poetry includes a lament for his death: 'Oh hero lying dead in the open, betrayed by his commanders and guards. I cry over you not for the loss of my comfort and companionship, but for your spear, your horse and your dreams. I cry over my lord who widowed me before our wedding night'.

Her husband was killed in 813, Very little is known about Lubana bint Ali ibn al-Mahdi after Al-Amin's death. She died in the 820s.

== Caliphs related to her ==
The caliphs who were related to her are:

| No. | Caliph | Relation |
|---|---|---|
| 2 | Al-Mansur | Great-grandfather |
| 3 | Al-Mahdi | Grandfather |
| 4 | Al-Hadi | Uncle |
| 5 | Harun al-Rashid | Father-in-law |
| 6 | Al-Amin | Husband |
| 7 | Al-Ma'mun | Brother-in-law |
| 8 | Al-Mu'tasim | Brother-in-law |

== Sources ==
- al-Masudi. The Meadows of Gold, The Abbasids. transl. Paul Lunde and Caroline Stone, Kegan Paul, London and New York, 1989.
- Abbott, Nabia (1946). Two Queens of Baghdad: Mother and Wife of Hārūn Al Rashīd. University of Chicago Press. ISBN 978-0-86356-031-6.
- Bosworth, C. E. (1993). "al-Muʿtaṣim Bi'llāh". In Bosworth, C. E.; van Donzel, E.; Heinrichs, W. P. & Pellat, Ch. (eds.). The Encyclopaedia of Islam, Second Edition. Volume VII: Mif–Naz. Leiden: E. J. Brill. p. 776. ISBN 978-90-04-09419-2.
- Masudi (2010) [1989]. The Meadows of Gold: The Abbasids. Translated by Paul Lunde and Caroline Stone. London and New York: Routledge. ISBN 978-0-7103-0246-5.
- Rekaya, M. (1991). "al-Maʾmūn". In Bosworth, C. E.; van Donzel, E. & Pellat, Ch. (eds.). The Encyclopaedia of Islam, Second Edition. Volume VI: Mahk–Mid. Leiden: E. J. Brill. pp. 331–339. doi:10.1163/1573-3912_islam_SIM_4889. ISBN 978-90-04-08112-3.
- Gabrieli, F. (1960). "al-Amīn". In Gibb, H. A. R.; Kramers, J. H.; Lévi-Provençal, E.; Schacht, J.; Lewis, B. & Pellat, Ch. (eds.). The Encyclopaedia of Islam, Second Edition. Volume I: A–B. Leiden: E. J. Brill. pp. 437–438. doi:10.1163/1573-3912_islam_SIM_0599. OCLC 495469456.
