= Mansur ibn al-Mahdi =

Abbasid prince and governor of Syria

Mansur ibn al-Mahdi منصور بن المهدي

Governor of Syria
- In office 809–810
- Monarchs: Harun al-Rashid, al-Amin
- Preceded by: Ali ibn al-Hasan ibn Qahtaba (807–809)
- Succeeded by: Ahmad ibn Sa'id al-Harashi (810) then Sulayman ibn Abi Ja'far (810)

Personal details
- Born: Khurasan or Baghdad, Abbasid Caliphate
- Died: 810s Baghdad, Abbasid Caliphate
- Parents: al-Mahdi (father); Bahtariyah (mother)
- Relatives: Sulayman (uncle)
- Full name: Mansur ibn Muhammad al-Mahdi
- Religion: Islam

Mansur ibn al-Mahdi (Arabic: منصور بن المهدي) was an Abbasid prince, son of Abbasid caliph al-Mahdi, brother of caliph al-Hadi and Harun al-Rashid. Mansur was governor of Syria during his nephew caliph al-Amin's reign.

== Life ==
Mansur was the son of al-Mahdi and his mother was al-Bahtariyah, the noble-born daughter of the Persian rebel, Masmughan of Damavand, against whom Mahdi was first sent to Khurasan. Her mother was Bakand, the daughter of Isbahbadh, Farrukhan the Little. She had a sister named Smyr. She bore al-Mahdi a son named for his grandfather, Mansur, and two daughters, Sulaimah and Aliyah.

His father, nominated his two elder sons; Musa al-Hadi and Harun al-Rashid as heirs. Mansur maintains good relations with all his siblings.

Mansur was appointed as governor of Syria in 809. He remained in office until al-Amin reappointed Sulayman to govern Syria around 809–810 in response to unrest in Damascus emanating from the theft of a prized crystal pitcher from the Umayyad Mosque by the incumbent governor, Sulayman's nephew Mansur. The outrage of the Damascenes prompted them to refuse prayer under Abbasid leadership.

After his dismissal from the office, Mansur returned to Baghdad in 810.

== Siblings ==
Mansur was contemporary and related to several Abbasid caliphs, princes and princesses. He had total ten half-siblings and he had two full sisters named Aliyah and Sulaimah.

No.	Abbasids	Relation
1	Musa al-Hadi	Half-brother
2	Harun al-Rashid	Half-brother
3	Abbasa bint al-Mahdi	Half-sister
4	Ubaydallah ibn al-Mahdi	Half-brother
5	Ulayya bint al-Mahdi	Half-sister
6	Ibrahim ibn al-Mahdi	Half-brother
7	Aliyah bint al-Mahdi	Sister
8	Ali ibn al-Mahdi	Half-brother
9	Sulaimah bint al-Mahdi	Sister
10	Abdallah ibn al-Mahdi	Half-brother
11	Banuqa bint al-Mahdi	Half-sister
12	Isa ibn al-Mahdi	Half-brother

== Sources ==
- Abbott, Nabia (1946). Two Queens of Baghdad: Mother and Wife of Hārūn Al Rashīd. University of Chicago Press. ISBN 978-0-86356-031-6.
- Houtsma, Martijn Theodoor (1993). E.J. Brill's First Encyclopaedia of Islam, 1913–1936. E.J. Brill's First Encyclopaedia of Islam, 1913–1936. E.J. Brill
- Al-Tabari; John Alden Williams (1988). Al-̣Tabarī: Volume 1, The Reign of Abū Ja'Far Al-Maṇsūr A. D. 754-775: The Early 'Abbāsī Empire. Al-Tabari. the Early Abbasi Empire. Cambridge University Press.
- Madelung, Wilferd (2000). "Abūʾl ʿAmayṭar the Sufyānī". Jerusalem Studies in Arabic and Islam. 24: 327–343.
