= Abbasa bint al-Mahdi =

8th-century Abbasid princess

Abbasa bint al-Mahdi العباسة بنت المهدي
- Born: c. 765; Abbasid Empire
- Died: 804/807; Abbasid Empire
- Spouse: Muhammad ibn Sulayman ibn Ali (until his death in 789); Ibrahim ibn Salih (until his death in 792)
- Relatives: see below
Names
- Abbasa bint Muhammad al-Mahdi ibn Abdallah al-Mansur
- House: Abbasid
- Father: al-Mahdi
- Mother: Rahim
- Religion: Islam

Abbasa bint al-Mahdi (Arabic: العباسة بنت المهدي, romanized: al-ʿAbbāsa; c. 765 – after 804) was a famous Abbasid princess. She was the daughter of Abbasid caliph al-Mahdi, sister of caliph Musa al-Hadi and Harun al-Rashid.

== Life ==
Abbasa was the daughter of the third Abbasid caliph, al-Mahdi, and a concubine of the Abbasid harem by the name of Rahim, thus she was the mother of his oldest surviving girl child, Abbasa. She was the half-sister of al-Hadi, Harun al-Rashid, Ulayya, and Ibrahim ibn al-Mahdi.

She was born during her grandfather reign, her father became caliph in 775. When Abbasa was a young her father arranged her marriage to a cadet member of Abbasid House.

Her husband was Muhammad ibn Sulayman, a prominent member of a cadet branch of the Abbasid dynasty, who was a long-time governor of Kufa and Basra. however her husband died in mid-November 789 and Abbasa became a widow.

She married again another Abbasid member during the reign of her brother Harun al-Rashid. Her second marriage was with Ibrahim ibn Salih, a member of another cadet branch of the Abbasid dynasty: he was a first cousin to the first two Abbasid caliphs al-Saffah (r. 750–754) and al-Mansur (r. 754–775). He also became a son-in-law to the third Abbasid caliph al-Mahdi (r. 775–785) by virtue of his marriage to the latter's daughter Abbasa. Ibrahim died in 792, shortly after having been appointed governor of Egypt a second time.

After her second husband's death, Abbasa spend rest of her life as a widow in his brother's caliphal palace. She died around 800s.

== Siblings ==
Abbasa was related to Abbasid house both by birth and through marriage like all other Abbasid princess. She was contemporary and related to several Abbasid caliphs, princes and princesses.

No.	Abbasids	Relation
1	Musa al-Hadi	Half-brother
2	Harun al-Rashid	Half-brother
3	Ubaydallah ibn al-Mahdi	Half-brother
4	Ali ibn al-Mahdi	Half-brother
5	Mansur ibn al-Mahdi	Half-brother
6	Aliyah bint al-Mahdi	Half-sister
7	Ulayya bint al-Mahdi	Half-sister
8	Abdallah ibn al-Mahdi	Half-brother
9	Ibrahim ibn al-Mahdi	Half-brother
10	Banuqa bint al-Mahdi	Half-sister
11	Isa ibn al-Mahdi	Half-brother

== Myths and legends ==
There are several myths and legends around Harun and his family. One notorious myth was that Harun al-Rashid was known for being unhappy with the fact that he was a relative of Abassa's, as he was attracted to her. To keep Abassa in his life, he had her marry Ja'far ibn Yahya. The marriage was supposed to be one of convenience, but Abassa fell in love with her arranged husband. At night, a slave woman would be sent to Ja'far's bedroom, and Abassa took the slave woman's place one evening. Her husband was surprised. Abassa would get pregnant and give birth to twin boys in secret. The twins would be raised in Mecca. Harun eventually found out about the relationship, and had Ja'far killed. Abassa was either killed, or, sent into exile.

== Sources ==
- Bosworth, C. E., ed. (1989). The History of al-Ṭabarī, Volume XXX: The ʿAbbāsid Caliphate in Equilibrium: The Caliphates of Mūsā al-Hādī and Hārūn al-Rashīd, A.D. 785–809/A.H. 169–192. SUNY Series in Near Eastern Studies. Albany, New York: State University of New York Press. ISBN 978-0-88706-564-4.
- Henry Gardiner Adams, ed. (1857). "Abbassah". A Cyclopaedia of Female Biography: 1. Wikidata Q115277361.
- Gil, Moshe (1997) [1983]. A History of Palestine, 634–1099. Translated by Ethel Broido. Cambridge: Cambridge University Press. ISBN 0-521-59984-9.
- Abbott, Nabia (1946). Two Queens of Baghdad: Mother and Wife of Hārūn Al Rashīd. University of Chicago Press. ISBN 978-0-86356-031-6.
- Ibn Qutaybah, Abu Muhammad Abdallah ibn Muslim (n.d.). Ukashah, Tharwat (ed.). Al-Ma'arif (in Arabic) (4th ed.). Cairo: al-Dar Ma'arif.
- Kennedy, Hugh (2006). When Baghdad Ruled the Muslim World: The Rise and Fall of Islam's Greatest Dynasty. Cambridge, Massachusetts: Da Capo Press. ISBN 978-0-306814808.
- Kennedy, Hugh, ed. (1990). The History of al-Ṭabarī, Volume XXIX: Al-Mansūr and al-Mahdī, A.D. 763–786/A.H. 146–169. SUNY Series in Near Eastern Studies. Albany, New York: State University of New York Press. ISBN 978-0-7914-0142-2.
- Al-Kindi, Muhammad ibn Yusuf (1912). Guest, Rhuvon (ed.). The Governors and Judges of Egypt (in Arabic). Leyden and London: E. J. Brill.
- Kennedy, Hugh (2016) [1981]. The Early Abbasid Caliphate: A Political History. Oxon and New York: Routledge. ISBN 978-1-315-66742-3.
- Ibn 'Asakir, Abu al-Qasim 'Ali ibn al-Hasan ibn Hibat Allah (1995). al-'Amrawi, 'Umar ibn Gharama (ed.). Tarikh Madinat Dimashq (in Arabic). Vol. 6. Beirut: Dar al-Fikr.
- McAuliffe, Jane Dammen, ed. (1995). The History of al-Ṭabarī, Volume XXVIII: The ʿAbbāsid Authority Affirmed: The Early Years of al-Mansūr, A.D. 753–763/A.H. 136–145. SUNY Series in Near Eastern Studies. Albany, New York: State University of New York Press. ISBN 978-0-7914-1895-6.
- Ibn Taghribirdi, Jamal al-Din Abu al-Mahasin Yusuf (1930). Nujum al-zahira fi muluk Misr wa'l-Qahira, Volume II (in Arabic). Cairo: Dar al-Kutub al-Misriyya.
