= Arwa bint Mansur al-Himyari =

Wife of Abbasid caliph Al-Mansur

Arwa bint Mansur al-Himyari أروى بنت منصور الحميري

Consort of the Abbasid caliph
- Tenure: 10 June 754 – 764
- Born: c. 735; Kairouan, Umayyad Caliphate (now Tunisia)
- Died: c. 764 (aged 29); Baghdad, Abbasid Caliphate
- Burial: Baghdad
- Spouse: al-Mansur
- Issue: Ja'far; al-Mahdi
Names
- Umm Musa Arwa bint Mansur al-Himyari
- House: Banu Himyar (by birth); Abbasid (by marriage)
- Father: Mansur al-Himyari
- Religion: Islam

Arwā bint Manṣūr al-Ḥimyarī (Arabic: أروى بنت منصور الحميري) also known as Umm Mūsā (Arabic: ام موسى) was the famous principal wife of Abbasid caliph al-Mansur (r. 754–775) and mother of third Abbasid caliph al-Mahdi.

== Biography ==
Arwa was the daughter of Mansur al-Himyari, a descendant of the Banu Himyar tribe, whose ancestors ruled Yemen in pre-Islamic times (110 BCE–525 CE). She was Al-Mansur's first wife. Arwa was also known as Umm Musa, her lineage went back to the Kings of Himyarite.

She married Abu Ja'far Abdallah ibn Muhammad, the future Abbasid caliph al-Mansur. She had two sons from her marriage, Ja'far and Muhammad, who became caliph al-Mahdi. According to their pre-marital agreement (later known as the Kairouanese marital agreement), while Arwa was still alive al-Mansur had no right to take other wives and have concubines. Al-Mansur tried to annul this agreement several times, but Arwa always managed to convince the judges not to do that. The two sons of Arwa, Muhammad and Ja'far were regarded as his heirs.

Her first son, Ja'far, was born in 742/743 and her second son, Muhammad, was born in 744 or 745 in the village of Humeima (modern-day Jordan).

When her brother-in-law, al-Saffah, died after a five-year reign, her husband al-Mansur became caliph and held on to power for nearly 22 years, from 754 to 775. Al-Mansur was proclaimed Caliph on his way to Mecca in the year 753 (136 AH) and was inaugurated the following year. Arwa convinced her husband to name only her two sons as heirs.

Her only son Muhammad was old enough to place in succession, Her elder son died during the reign of al-Mansur. Arwa died in 764, at the age of 29. It was only after her death that al-Mansur took other wives. (Note: Al-Mansur married two Arab women after Arwa's death; Fatima and Hammadah. He also had four concubines; Umm Jafar al-Kurdiyya, Qali-al Farrashah, Umm Qasim and Aliyah al-Ummaiyah.)

She had a brother named Yazid. His full name was Yazid ibn Mansur al-Himyari.

Her paternal nephew, Mansur ibn Yazid ibn Mansur al-Himyari held important positions in Caliphate. In 779 he spent two months as governor of Egypt. Between 781/2 and 783 he was governor of the Yemen, and in 796 he briefly served as the governor of Khurasan.

== See also ==
- Umm Salama bint Ya'qub al-Makhzumi
- Fatimah bint Muhammad al-Taymi

== Sources ==
- Abbott, Nabia (1946). Two Queens of Baghdad: Mother and Wife of Hārūn Al Rashīd. University of Chicago Press.
- al-Masudi. The Meadows of Gold, The Abbasids. transl. Paul Lunde and Caroline Stone, Kegan Paul, London and New York, 1989.
- Bosworth, C. E. (2011). The Ornament of Histories: A History of the Eastern Islamic Lands AD 650-1041: The Persian Text of Abu Sa'id 'Abd Al-Hayy Gardizi. I.B.Tauris. pp. 1–169. ISBN 978-1-84885-353-9.
- Al-Kindi, Muhammad ibn Yusuf (1912). Guest, Rhuvon (ed.). The Governors and Judges of Egypt (in Arabic). Leyden and London: E. J. Brill.
- Al-Tabari; Hugh Kennedy (1990). The History of al-Tabari Vol. 29: Al-Mansur and al-Mahdi A.D. 763-786/A.H. 146–169. SUNY series in Near Eastern Studies. State University of New York Press. pp. 148–49.
- Gordon, Matthew S.; Robinson, Chase F.; Rowson, Everett K.; et al., eds. (2018). The Works of Ibn Wadih al-Ya'qubi: An English Translation. Vol. 3. Leiden and Boston: Brill. ISBN 978-90-04-35621-4.
- Hamzah al-Isfahani, Ibn al-Hasan (1844). Gottwaldt, J.M.E. (ed.). Hamzae Ispahanensis Annalium, Libri X. Leipzig: Leopold Voss.
- Ibn Abd al-Majid, Taj al-Din 'Abd al-Baqi al-Yamani (1985). Ta'rikh al-Yaman al-Musamma Bahjat al-Zaman fi Ta'rikh al-Yaman. Sana'a: Dar Kalimah.
- Ibn Taghribirdi, Jamal al-Din Abu al-Mahasin Yusuf (1930). Nujum al-zahira fi muluk Misr wa'l-Qahira, Volume II (in Arabic). Cairo: Dar al-Kutub al-Misriyya.
- Khalifah ibn Khayyat (1985). al-Umari, Akram Diya' (ed.). Tarikh Khalifah ibn Khayyat, 3rd ed (in Arabic). Al-Riyadh: Dar Taybah.
- Yarshater, Ehsan, ed. (1985–2007). The History of al-Ṭabarī (40 vols). SUNY Series in Near Eastern Studies. Albany, New York: State University of New York Press. ISBN 978-0-7914-7249-1.
