= Ibrahim ibn al-Mahdi =

Abbasid prince, singer, composer and poet (779–839)

Ibrahim ibn al-Mahdi إبراهيم بن المهدي
- Born: 779; Baghdad, Abbasid Caliphate
- Died: 839; Baghdad/Samarra, Abbasid Caliphate
- Spouse: Umm Muhammad (divorced); Shāriyah; Bid'ah; Rayyiq; Khishf; Shaja
- Children: Hibat Allah
Names
- Ibrāhīm ibn Muḥammad al-Mahdī
- Dynasty: Abbasid
- Father: Al-Mahdi
- Mother: Shakla
- Religion: Islam
- Occupation: Singer, Composer, Arabic poet

Ibrāhīm ibn al-Mahdī (Arabic: إبراهيم بن المهدي; 779–839) was an Abbasid prince, singer, composer and poet. He was the son of the third Abbasid caliph, al-Mahdi, and the half-brother of the poet and musician Ulayya. Ibrahim was contemporary of Abbasid caliph al-Hadi, al-Rashid and his three nephews caliph al-Amin, al-Ma'mun, al-Mu'tasim.

== Biography ==
Ibrahim was born in 779. He was the son of Abbasid caliph al-Mahdi, and was born during the Caliphate of his father. His mother was Shaklah, whose father was Khwanadan, steward of Masmughan. She had a brother named Humayd. She was acquired by Al-Mahdi when she was a child. He presented her to his concubine Muhayyat, who, discovering a musical talent in the child, sent her to the famous school of Taif in the Hijaz for a thorough musical education. Years later Al-Mahdi, then caliph, took her as his concubine.

One of his wives was Umm Muhammad. She was the daughter of Salih al-Miskin and Umm Abdullah bint Isa ibn Ali. After Ibrahim divorced her, she married Harun al-Rashid.

During the Fourth Fitna, Ibrahim was proclaimed caliph on 20 July 817 by the people of Baghdad, who gave him the regnal name of al-Mubarak (Arabic: المبارك) and declared his reigning nephew al-Ma'mun deposed. Ibrahim received the allegiance of the Hashemites. He had to resign in 819, and spent the rest of his life as a poet and a musician. He is remembered as "one of the most gifted musicians of his day, with a phenomenal vocal range", and a promoter of the then innovative 'Persian style' of song, 'which was characterized inter alia by redundant improvisation'.

Ibrahim died in 839 during the Caliphate of his younger nephew al-Mu'tasim.

=== Culinary interests ===
Ibn al-Mahdi has been described by historians as a "gourmet prince". He authored what is possibly the first Arabic language cookbook, kitab al-tabikh. The book is referenced in Ibn Sayyar al-Warraq's Kitāb al-Ṭabīkh, with many recipes credited to him. Ibn al-Mahdi also composed poetry about various dishes. Nearly 10th of Ibn Sayyar's non-medicinal recipes were contributed by ibn al-Mahdi.

== Siblings ==
Ibrahim was related to several Abbasid caliphs. He was also contemporary to several Abbasid caliphs, princess and princesses. Ibrahim was at one point married to Abbasid princess Umm Muhammad.

No.	Abbasids	Relation
1	Musa al-Hadi	Half-brother
2	Harun al-Rashid	Half-brother
3	Abbasa bint al-Mahdi	Half-sister
4	Ubaydallah ibn al-Mahdi	Half-brother
5	Ulayya bint al-Mahdi	Half-sister
6	Banuqa bint al-Mahdi	Half-sister
7	Mansur ibn al-Mahdi	Half-brother
8	Aliyah bint al-Mahdi	Half-sister
9	Ali ibn al-Mahdi	Half-brother
10	Abdallah ibn al-Mahdi	Half-brother
11	Isa ibn al-Mahdi	Half-brother

== Sources ==
- Abbott, Nabia (1946). Two Queens of Baghdad: Mother and Wife of Hārūn Al Rashīd. University of Chicago Press. ISBN 978-0-86356-031-6.
- Kilpatrick, H. (1998). Meisami, Julie Scott; Starkey, Paul (eds.). Encyclopedia of Arabic Literature. Vol. 1. Taylor & Francis. p. 387. ISBN 978-0-415-18571-4.
- Al-Tabari; John Alden Williams (1988). Al-̣Tabarī: Volume 1, The Reign of Abū Ja'Far Al-Maṇsūr A. D. 754-775: The Early ‛Abbāsī Empire. Al-Tabari. the Early Abbasi Empire. Cambridge University Press. p. 46. ISBN 978-0-521-32662-9.
- al-Tabari, Muhammad Ibn Yarir; Bosworth, Clifford Edmund (1989). The History of al-Tabari Vol. 30: The 'Abbasid Caliphate in Equilibrium: The Caliphates of Musa al-Hadi and Harun al-Rashid A.D. 785-809/A.H. 169-193. Bibliotheca Persica. State University of New York Press. ISBN 978-0-88706-564-4.
- Fishbein, Michael (2015). The History of al-Tabari Vol. 31: The War between Brothers: The Caliphate of Muhammad al-Amin A.D. 809-813/A.H. 193–198. SUNY series in Near Eastern Studies. State University of New York Press. p. 187. ISBN 978-1-4384-0289-5.
