= Umm Isa bint Musa al-Hadi =

Arab princess and first wife of Abbasid caliph Al-Ma'mun

Umm Isa bint Musa al-Hadi أم عيسى بنت موسى الهادي
- Zawjat al khalifa

Consort of the Abbasid caliph
- Predecessor: Lubana bint Ali ibn al-Mahdi
- Successor: Khadija bint al-Hasan ibn Sahl
- Born: c. 783/85; Baghdad or Haditha, Abbasid Caliphate
- Died: 830s Baghdad, Abbasid Caliphate
- Burial: Baghdad
- Spouse: Al-Ma'mun
- Children: Muhammad al-Asghar ibn al-Ma'mun; Abd Allah ibn al-Ma'mun
- Dynasty: Abbasid
- Father: Musa al-Hadi
- Religion: Islam

Umm ʿĪsā bint Mūsā al-Hādī (Arabic: أم عيسى بنت موسى الهادي) was an Abbasid dynasty princess, daughter of caliph al-Hadi, niece of caliph Harun al-Rashid and principal wife of al-Ma'mun, the seventh caliph of the Abbasid Caliphate.

Umm Isa was the daughter of Al-Hadi (r. 785–786) from one of his concubines. She was born around 783 or 785. She spent her childhood in Baghdad. She was a young child when her father died in 786. Her father was succeeded by her uncle Harun al-Rashid. Her uncle took care of her and her brothers after al-Hadi's death.

Al-Ma'mun married his first wife Umm Isa, the daughter of his uncle al-Hadi, whom he married when he was eighteen years old. They had two sons, Muhammad al-Asghar, and Abd Allah. This marriage was arranged during Harun al-Rashid's reign. Also, The two sons of al-Hadi, Isma'il and Ja'far married Harun-Rashid's daughters, Hamdunah and Fatimah respectively. Thus, the two daughters of Harun were also cousins and sister-in-laws of Umm Isa. She lived a secluded life in the Caliph's harem, only a few things is known about her.

Umm Isa was one or two years older than her husband al-Ma'mun. Her husband was born on the same day when her father died and her uncle ascended to the Caliphate.

Her uncle, caliph Harun al-Rashid had nominated his two elder sons Al-Amin and al-Ma'mun as heir. Already in 792, Harun had Muhammad receive the oath of allegiance (bay'ah) with the name of al-Amin ("The Trustworthy"), effectively marking him out as his main heir, while Abd Allah was not named second heir, under the name al-Maʾmūn ("The Trusted One") until 799. Her husband al-Ma'mun became caliph after the death of her cousin and brother-in-law al-Amin. In 813, al-Amin was beheaded, and al-Maʾmūn became the undisputed Caliph.

== Family ==
Umm Isa was related to the Abbasid ruling House paternally. She was contemporary to several Abbasid caliphs, Abbasid prince and Princesses.

No.	Abbasids	Relation
1	Musa al-Hadi	Father
2	Harun al-Rashid	Uncle and Father-in-law
3	Al-Amin	Cousin and Brother-in-law
4	Al-Ma'mun	Husband
5	Muhammad al-Asghar	Elder son
6	Abdallah ibn al-Ma'mun	Second son
7	Hamdunah bint Harun al-Rashid	Sister-in-law
8	Fatimah bint Harun al-Rashid	Sister-in-law
9	Jafar ibn Musa al-Hadi	Brother
10	Al-Abbas ibn Musa al-Hadi	Brother
11	Abdallah ibn Musa al-Hadi	Brother
12	Ishaq ibn Musa al-Hadi	Brother
13	Isma'il ibn Musa al-Hadi	Brother
14	Sulayman ibn Musa al-Hadi	Brother
15	Musa ibn Musa al-Hadi	Brother
16	Umm al-Abbas bint Musa al-Hadi	Sister

== Sources ==
- Rekaya, M. (1991). "al-Maʾmūn". In Bosworth, C. E.; van Donzel, E. & Pellat, Ch. (eds.). The Encyclopaedia of Islam, Second Edition. Volume VI: Mahk–Mid. Leiden: E. J. Brill. pp. 331–339. ISBN 978-90-04-08112-3.
- Abbott, Nabia (1946). Two Queens of Baghdad: Mother and Wife of Hārūn Al Rashīd. University of Chicago Press. ISBN 978-0-86356-031-6.
- Ibn al-Sāʿī (2017). Consorts of the Caliphs: Women and the Court of Baghdad
- Gabrieli, F. (1960). "al-Amīn". In Gibb, H. A. R.; Kramers, J. H.; Lévi-Provençal, E.; Schacht, J.; Lewis, B. & Pellat, Ch. (eds.). The Encyclopaedia of Islam, Second Edition. Volume I: A–B. Leiden: E. J. Brill. pp. 437–438. doi:10.1163/1573-3912_islam_SIM_0599. OCLC 495469456.
