= Wadih =

Wadih is a masculine name of Arabic origin that may be the transliteration of the Arabic name Wāḍiḥ (Arabic: واضح) or an anglicisation of the Arabic name Wadīʿ (Arabic: وديع). Notable people with the name include:

== Given name ==
- Wadih Fares, Canadian property developer
- Wadih Gosn (born 1953), Lebanese judoka
- Wadih el-Hage (born 1960), Lebanese al-Qaeda member serving a life sentence in the United States
- Wadih Sa'adeh (born 1948), Lebanese-Australian poet
- Wadih Sabra (1876–1952), Lebanese composer
- Wadih El Safi (1921–2013), Lebanese singer, songwriter, composer and actor
- Wadih al-Siqlabi (died 1011), Slavic Muslim general in Spain
