= Farouk Omar =

Iraqi historian

Farouk Omar Hussein Fawzi al-Anzi is an Iraqi historian, thinker, and Diplomat. He specializes in Islamic studies and Middle Eastern studies. he has contributed articles to major reference works including the Encyclopedia Britannica and the Encyclopedia of Islam. Farouk Omar, whose doctoral thesis on the Abbasid Caliphate was examined by Bernard Lewis and Montgomery Watt, who acknowledged that his research overturned many old Orientalist concepts about the early Abbasid period. He has been recognized in the International Biographical Dictionary (B.I.D) for Distinguished Service to the Community.

== Biography ==
Farouk Omar Hussein Fawzi (1938, Mosul - ) is an Iraqi historian and intellectual. He was born in Mosul, where he completed his primary and secondary education before moving to Baghdad to study at the University of Baghdad, where he obtained his BA with honors in History in 1961. This academic distinction qualified him for an official scholarship to pursue doctoral studies in Islamic History at the University of London in Britain, where he completed his PhD in 1967.Upon his return, he became a lecturer at the College of Arts, History Department at the University of Baghdad, and received the rank of Professor in 1979. He served as head of the History Department from 1978 to 1980 and as an ambassador at the Ministry of Foreign Affairs in 1976. Over the years, he held various academic and administrative positions and lectured at Arab and international universities. He worked at Al al-Bayt University in Jordan for several years, where he became head of the History Department and director of the Ottoman Studies Unit. He currently works at Sultan Qaboos University in the Sultanate of Oman.He emigrated from Iraq in 1999 and is a member of the Royal Asiatic Society in London. He has contributed to several major reference works including the Encyclopedia of Islam, Encyclopedia Britannica, UNESCO's "History of Humanity," the "History of the Arab Nation" for the Arab Organization for Education, Culture and Sciences, and the Palestinian Encyclopedia published in Damascus under the supervision of the Palestine Liberation Organization.

== Bibliography ==
Among his works:

- The Abbasid Caliphate 132-170 AH (1969) Baghdad (in Arabic)
- Nature of the Abbasid Da'wah (1970) Beirut (in Arabic)
- The Early Abbasids 3 volumes (1970, 1973, 1983) Beirut, Damascus, Amman (in Arabic)
- The Abbasid Caliphate in the Era of Military Chaos (1979) Beirut (in Arabic)
- The Abbasid Caliphate in the Later Periods (1983) Sharjah (in Arabic)
- Research in Abbasid History (1977) Baghdad (in Arabic)
- Abbasid Studies (1976), Baghdad
- Islamic History and Twentieth Century Thought (1980) Beirut (in Arabic)
- Sources of Local History of the Oman Region (1979) Baghdad (in Arabic)
- The Arabian Gulf in Islamic Ages (1983) Beirut (in Arabic)
- Islamic Systems (1981) Baghdad (in Arabic)
- Political History of Palestine in Islamic Ages (1982) Abu Dhabi (in Arabic)
- Arab-American Relations in the Gulf (translation in English) (1977) Basra
- History of Palestine in the Middle Ages (translation in English) (1973) Baghdad (in Arabic)
- Encyclopedia of Islam (contributor)
- Encyclopedia Britannica (contributor)
- Palestinian Encyclopedia (contributor)
- Encyclopedia of Iraqi Civilization (contributor)
- Orientalism and Islamic History: The Early Islamic Centuries/Comparative Study (in Arabic)
- The Abbasid Revolution (in Arabic)
- History of Iraq in the Ages of the Arab-Islamic Caliphate (in Arabic)
- Rulers of Persia and Aggression Against Iraq During the Abbasid Era (in Arabic)
- Khalifa ibn Khayyat as Historian 240-854 (in Arabic)
- The Emergence of Religious and Political Movements in Islam (in Arabic)
- Iraq and the Persian Challenge (in Arabic)
- Arab Thought in Confronting Shu'ubiyyah in the Era of the Arab-Islamic Caliphate (in Arabic)
- The Army and Politics: In the late Umayyad Era and the early of the Abbasid Era (in Arabic)

== Status ==
Historian Hichem Djait answered a question about what Arabs achieved in the twentieth century, saying: "The only achievement is in the field of Arab historical studies and research, and in this field we find only a small number of good historians, including Abd al-Aziz al-Duri and Salih Ahmad al-Ali, followed by Farouk Omar Fawzi. The writings of these historians, all of whom are Iraqi, are almost the only ones in all Arab production in the field of human sciences that are internationally recognized as serious research mastering their material."
