= Nabia Abbott =

Scholar of Islam, papyrologist and paleographer (1897-1981)

- Nabia Abbott at the Oriental Institute
- Born: Nabia Abbott; 31 January 1897; Mardin, Ottoman Empire
- Died: 15 October 1981 (aged 84); Chicago

Academic background
- Education: Isabella Thoburn College; Boston University (M.A.); University of Chicago (PhD)
- Thesis: The Kurrah Papyri of the Oriental Institute (1936)
- Doctoral advisor: Martin Sprengling

Academic work
- Discipline: Islamic Studies
- Sub-discipline: Papyrology; Philology
- Institutions: University of Chicago Oriental Institute
- Notable works: Aisha, the Beloved of Mohammed (1942); Two Queens of Baghdad (1946)

Nabia Abbott (31 January 1897 – 15 October 1981) was an American scholar of Islam, papyrologist and paleographer. She was the first woman professor at the Oriental Institute of the University of Chicago. She gained worldwide recognition for her researches into the emergence of the Arabic script and the oldest written documents of Islam. She was also a pioneer in the study of early Muslim women. Especially noteworthy was her biography of Aisha, one of the wives of the Islamic prophet Muhammad.

== Biography ==
Nabia Abbott was born on January 31, 1897, in Mardin, Ottoman Empire. Her father was a Christian merchant whose business activities brought his family first to Mosul, then to Baghdad and finally to Bombay. There she attended various English-language schools. In 1919 she completed her undergraduate studies with honours at the Isabella Thoburn College in Lucknow.

After her graduation, Nabia returned for a short time to Iraq where she worked educating women. The politician and orientalist Gertrude Bell offered her friendship and supported her in her research.

In 1923, Abbott moved with her family to the United States and received a master's degree in 1925 from Boston University. From 1925 to 1933, she taught history at Asbury College in Wilmore, Kentucky, where she rose to the head of the Department of History. In 1933 she joined the Oriental Institute of the University of Chicago to begin her doctoral studies under Martin Sprengling. She became a Professor of Islamic Studies at the Oriental Institute in 1949. After her 1963 retirement, she became Professor Emerita.

Nabia Abbott died in Chicago on 15 October 1981.

== Research ==
=== Papyrology ===
Nabia Abbott's concentration was in Arabic and Islamic studies. The Oriental Institute had a large collection of early Islamic papyri and documents on paper and parchment. Abbott published these documents and helped expand the Institute's collection.

=== Arabian Nights ===
In al-Maqqari's History of Spain Under the Moslems, there is a reference to the existence of a 12th-century work titled Thousand and One Nights. Abbott notes this in her documentation of the early evolution of the tales. Among other conclusions, she showed that the Arabian Nights borrows the framing tale (around which are accumulated Arabised and original Arabian stories) from the Hezar Afsaneh, an Indo-Persian collection of tales.

Abbott published an essay in 1949 about a 9th-century fragment of the Arabian Nights, which contains the title and first page of the works. She demonstrated its assistance in elucidating early Arabic palaeography as well as the development of early Islamic books in paper. She proved it was nearly a century older than earliest known references to the Arabian Nights, and established a chronology of the evolution of the Arabian Nights, which has remained valid since then.

=== Hadiths ===
Early generations of Western scholars of Islam, notably Ignác Goldziher and Joseph Schacht, had introduced a scepticism to the hadith tradition, which - as actions or habits by the Muhammad - was supposedly the basis for Islamic Law. They claimed that these originated, instead, in the first few centuries of Islam (therefore, not contemporaneous with Muhammad), and that these were attempts to shoehorn authority atop a legal foundation that had already been laid. Indeed, the hadith had been traditionally held to be of higher consequence than the opinions of Muhammad's successors or companions, and over time, the desire to promote certain laws over others resulted in the attribution of Successors' arguments to the Companions, and the Companions' opinions to Muhammad himself. Nabia Abbott, on the other hand, argued that hadith was an original practice in Islam, held in written form until they entered the canonical books. In answer to the question of the unavailability of these early manuscripts, she blamed the Caliph Umar, who ordered the destruction of these writings to prevent a parallel development of holy literature that might contend against the Qur'an. After his death, however, the remaining hadiths compiled by some of the Muhammad's companions, formed the basis of the later collections.

== Selected works ==
=== Articles ===
- Abbott, Nabia (1977). "Wahb B. Munabbih: A Review Article". Journal of Near Eastern Studies. 36 (2): 103–112. doi:10.1086/372551. S2CID 162209400.
- Abbott, Nabia (July 1949). "A Ninth-Century Fragment of the ″Thousand Nights″: New Light on the Early History of the Arabian Nights". Journal of Near Eastern Studies. VIII (3): 129. doi:10.1086/370926. S2CID 162013745.
- Abbott, Nabia (1942). "Women and the State in Early Islam". Journal of Near Eastern Studies. 1 (3): 341–368. doi:10.1086/370650. S2CID 222442262.
- Abbott, Nabia (1941). "Arabic Paleography". Ars Islamica. 8: 65–104. JSTOR 4515583.
- Abbott, Nabia (1941). "Pre-Islamic Arab Queens". The American Journal of Semitic Languages and Literatures. 58: 1–22. doi:10.1086/370586. S2CID 170870845.
- Abbott, Nabia (1939). "The Contribution of Ibn Muklah to the North-Arabic Script". The American Journal of Semitic Languages and Literatures. 56: 70–83. doi:10.1086/370527. S2CID 170562180.
- Abbott, Nabia (1939). "The Rise of the North Arabic Script and its Kur'anic Development, with a Full Description of the Kur'an Manuscripts in the Oriental Institute". The University of Chicago Oriental Institute Publications. 1. University of Chicago.
- Abbott, Nabia (1937). "The Monasteries of the Fayyum" (PDF). The American Journal of Semitic Languages. University of Chicago.

=== Books ===
- Abbott, Nabia (1972). Studies in Arabic Literary Papyri III: Language and Literature (PDF). The University of Chicago Oriental Institute Publications. Vol. LXXVII. University of Chicago.
- Abbott, Nabia (1967). Studies in Arabic Literary Papyri II: Qur'ānic Commentary and Tradition (PDF). The University of Chicago Oriental Institute Publications. Vol. LXXVI. University of Chicago.
- Abbott, Nabia (1957). Studies in Arabic Literary Papyri I: Historical Texts (PDF). The University of Chicago Oriental Institute Publications. Vol. LXXV. University of Chicago.
- Abbott, Nabia (1946). Two queens of Baghdad: mother and wife of Hārūn al Rashīd. University of Chicago.
- Abbott, Nabia (1942). Aishah: The Beloved of Mohammed. University of Chicago.
- Abbott, Nabia (1939). The rise of the north Arabic script and its Ḳur'ānic development, with a full description of the Ḳur'ān manuscripts in the Oriental institute (PDF). The University of Chicago Oriental Institute Publications. Vol. L. University of Chicago.
- Abbott, Nabia (1938). The Kurrah Papyri from Aphrodito in the Oriental Institute (PDF) (PhD thesis). University of Chicago.
