= Boran (disambiguation) =

Boran may refer to:

- Boran (name), a Turkish masculine given name and a surname
- Boran, queen of Sasanian Iran from 629 to 632
- An alternate spelling of Buran bint al-Hasan ibn Sahl, wife of the Abbasid caliph al-Ma'mun
- Boran languages, part of the proposed Bora–Witoto language family
- Boran, or Borana people, a pastoralist people in southern Ethiopia and northern Kenya
  - Borana language
- Boran cattle, a breed of cattle found in eastern Africa and associated with the Borana

== See also ==
- Borani, a Persian appetizer with yoghurt
- Bodhrán, Irish frame drum
- Muay Boran, a Thai martial art
- Borana (disambiguation)
- Buran (disambiguation)
