= Buran =

Buran may refer to:

== Places ==
- Buran, Ardabil, a village in Ardabil Province, Iran
- Buran, Mazandaran, a village in Mazandaran Province, Iran
- Buran, Ukraine, an urban-type settlement in Luhansk Oblast, Ukraine, also known as Enhelsove

== People ==
- An alternate spelling of Boran, queen of Sasanian Iran from 629 to 632
- Buran bint al-Hasan ibn Sahl, wife of the Abbasid caliph al-Ma'mun

== Other uses ==
- Buran programme, the Soviet space shuttle project, counterpart of the U.S. space shuttle
  - Buran (spacecraft), a Soviet shuttle launched in 1988
- Buran (wind), a wind that blows across eastern Asia
- Buran bint al-Hasan ibn Sahl, consort of Abbasid caliph al-Ma'mun
- RSS-40 Buran, a Soviet cruise missile
- Buran eavesdropping device
- Buran (icebreaker)

== See also ==
- Burang (disambiguation)
- Burren (disambiguation)
- Buraan, a town in the northern Sanaag region of Somalia
- Buranji, Indian historical chronicles
  - Tripura Buranji
- Boran (disambiguation)
