= Buren (name) =

Buren is both a given name and a surname. Notable people with the name include:

Given name:

- Buren Bayaer (1960–2018), Chinese singer and composer
- Buren R. Sherman (1836–1904), American politician
- Buren Skeen (1936–1965), American NASCAR driver

Surname:

- Daniel Buren (born 1938), French artist

== See also ==
- Büren (disambiguation)
- Van Buren (disambiguation)
