= Buren (disambiguation) =

Buren refers to both a municipality and a town in the Betuwe region of the Netherlands.

Buren may also refer to:

- Buren, Friesland
- County of Buren

== See also ==
- Van Buren (disambiguation)
- Beuren (disambiguation)
- Büren (disambiguation)
- Burren (disambiguation)
