= Van Buren Township, Indiana =

Van Buren Township is the name of eleven townships in Indiana:

- Van Buren Township, Brown County, Indiana
- Van Buren Township, Clay County, Indiana
- Van Buren Township, Daviess County, Indiana
- Van Buren Township, Fountain County, Indiana
- Van Buren Township, Grant County, Indiana
- Van Buren Township, Kosciusko County, Indiana
- Van Buren Township, LaGrange County, Indiana
- Van Buren Township, Madison County, Indiana
- Van Buren Township, Monroe County, Indiana
- Van Buren Township, Pulaski County, Indiana
- Van Buren Township, Shelby County, Indiana

== See also ==
- Van Buren Township (disambiguation)
