= Burin =

Burin may refer to:

== Tools ==
- Burin (engraving), a tool with a narrow sharp face at the tip used for engraving and other purposes
- Burin (lithic flake), a type of Stone Age tool with a chisel-like edge

== Places ==
- Burin, Nablus, a village on the West Bank, Palestine
- Burin, Newfoundland and Labrador, a town in Canada
- Burin Peninsula, a Canadian peninsula

== See also ==
- Tonde Burin, a 1994-1995 manga
- Felipe Burin (born 1992), Brazilian footballer
- Buren (disambiguation)
