= James Van Buren =

James Van Buren may refer to:

- James H. Van Buren (1850–1917), bishop of the Episcopal Diocese of Puerto Rico
- James Lyman Van Buren (1837–1866), American Union Army general
