= Van Buren Township, Ohio =

Van Buren Township, Ohio may refer to:

- Van Buren Township, Darke County, Ohio
- Van Buren Township, Hancock County, Ohio
- Van Buren Township, Putnam County, Ohio
- Van Buren Township, Shelby County, Ohio

== See also ==
- Van Buren Township (disambiguation)
