= Al-Hasan ibn Sahl =

Abbasid governor and official

Abbasid governor of Iraq
- In office 813 – 818/19
- Monarch: Al-Ma'mun
- Preceded by: New post established
- Succeeded by: Post abolished

Personal details
- Born: Khorasan, Abbasid Caliphate
- Died: c. 850/851 Wasit, Abbasid Caliphate (now Iraq)
- Spouse: unknown
- Children: Buran
- Parent: Sahl
- Relatives: Al-Fadl (brother)

Al-Hasan ibn Sahl (Arabic: الحسن بن سهل; died 850/51) was an Abbasid official and governor of Iraq for Caliph al-Ma'mun (reigned 813–833) during the Fourth Fitna.

Hasan's father was an Iranian Zoroastrian convert to Islam. Along with his brother, the future vizier al-Fadl ibn Sahl, Hasan entered the service of the Barmakid al-Fadl ibn Yahya in the reign of Harun al-Rashid (r. 786–809). During the civil war of the Fourth Fitna against Ma'mun's half-brother al-Amin (r. 808–813), he was entrusted with the supervision of the land tax (kharaj) office.

After Ma'mun's troops captured the caliphal capital, Baghdad, Hasan was sent west to assume the governance of Iraq, while Ma'mun and Fadl remained in Marv. In early 815, the Zaydi Alid revolt of Ibn Tabataba and Abu'l-Saraya broke out at Kufa and spread quickly through southern Iraq. Hasan proved unable to confront it, and the rebels at one point threatened Baghdad itself before the intervention of the capable general Harthama ibn A'yan led to the suppression of the revolt. The domination of the Caliphate by Fadl and the Khurasanis around him however aroused great opposition among the old-established Arab aristocracy who advised al-Ma'mun to replace him with an Arab governor instead. The animosity between al-Hasan and the Arab aristocracy is reflected by the slogan: "We won't accept the Zoroastrian, son of the Zoroastrian al-Hasan b. Sahl, and we'll drive him out until he returns to Khurasan". Hasan ibn Sahl was forced to abandon the city, where various factional leaders shared power. A year later his brother al-Fadl was assassinated. Perhaps by the same party. In July 817, after news reached the city that Ma'mun had chosen an Alid, Ali ibn Musa al-Rida, as his heir-apparent, the city appointed his uncle, Ibrahim ibn al-Mahdi, as Caliph.

Following Fadl's murder in 818 and Ma'mun's entry in Baghdad in 819, there were expectations that Hasan would succeed his brother as vizier of the Caliphate, but Hasan, shocked by Fadl's death, preferred to retire from politics and withdraw to his estates around Wasit, where he remained until his death in 850/1. In 825, however, he married his daughter, Buran (807–884), to Ma'mun, and gave her as dowry the palace of Qasr al-Hasani, south of Baghdad, which thereafter became one of the caliphal residences.

== Sources ==
- Kennedy, Hugh N. (2004). The Prophet and the Age of the Caliphates: The Islamic Near East from the 6th to the 11th Century (Second ed.). Harlow, UK: Pearson Education Ltd. ISBN 0-582-40525-4.
- Sourdel, Dominique (1971). "al-Ḥasan b. Sahl". In Lewis, B.; Ménage, V. L.; Pellat, Ch. & Schacht, J. (eds.). The Encyclopaedia of Islam, Second Edition. Volume III: H–Iram. Leiden: E. J. Brill. pp. 243–244. OCLC 495469525.
