= Van Buuren (surname) =

Van Buuren (pronounced [vɑm ˈbyːrə(n)]) is a Dutch toponymic surname meaning "from/of Buuren". Buuren usually refers to the County or town of Buren in Gelderland, sometimes perhaps to Büren, Westphalia. Variant spellings are Van Beuren (an American form), Van Bueren, and Van Buren. Notable people with the surname include:

Van Buuren

- Armin van Buuren (born 1976), Dutch DJ, record producer and remixer
- David van Buuren (1886–1955), Dutch banker and art collector in Belgium
- Graeme van Buuren (born 1990), South African cricketer
- Kees van Buuren (born 1986), Dutch football defender
- Johannes Antonius Marie van Buuren (1884–1970), Dutch politician, Minister of Infrastructure 1937–39
- Meindert van Buuren (born 1995), Dutch racing driver
- Mitchell Van Buuren (born 1988), South African cricketer
- Mosey van Buuren (1865–1950), South African rugby player
- Wilco van Buuren (born 1962), Dutch football defender

Van Bueren

- Edwin van Bueren (born 1980), Dutch football midfielder
- Geraldine Van Bueren (born 1955), British international human rights lawyer
- Nikolaus van Bueren (c.1380–1445), master builder of the Cologne Cathedral
- Walter van Bueren (1912–?), Swiss boxer

== See also ==
- Van Buren (surname), Dutch surname of the same origin and pronunciation
- Armin von Büren (born 1928), Swiss cyclist
- Oskar von Büren (born 1933), Swiss cyclist, brother of Armin
- Otto von Büren (1822–1888), Swiss politician, mayor of Bern
