= Van Buren (disambiguation) =

Martin Van Buren (1782–1862) was the eighth president of the United States from 1837 to 1841.

Van Buren may also refer to:

== People ==
- Van Buren (surname)

== Places ==
=== United States ===
- Van Buren, Arkansas
- Van Buren, Louisiana
- Van Buren, Indiana
- Van Buren, Iowa
- Van Buren, Maine, a New England town
  - Van Buren (CDP), Maine, the main village in the town
- Van Buren, Mississippi, a ghost town
- Van Buren, Missouri
- Van Buren, New York
- Van Buren, Ohio
- Van Buren, Tennessee
- Van Buren, Wisconsin
- Van Buren Lake, a lake in Ohio
- Van Buren County (disambiguation)
- Van Buren Township (disambiguation)

== Buildings ==
- Van Buren, Martin, National Historic Site, United States
- The Van Buren, music venue in Phoenix, Arizona

== Law ==
- Van Buren v. United States, a United States Supreme Court case

== Ships ==
- USS Van Buren, United States Navy ships of the name
- USS Van Buren (1839), a schooner that served in the U.S. Revenue Cutter Service and U.S. Navy
- USS Van Buren (PF-42), U.S. Navy frigate
- USS John J. Van Buren (DE-753), a United States Navy destroyer escort cancelled in 1944

== Video games ==
- Van Buren (video game), the codename given to Interplay's canceled third Fallout video game

== See also ==
- Armin van Buuren (born 1976), Dutch music producer and DJ
- Buren (disambiguation)
- Büren (disambiguation)
- Van Beuren Studios, an American animation studio that produced theatrical cartoons from 1928 to 1936
