= Van Beuren (surname) =

Van Beuren (pronounced [vɑm ˈbøːrə(n)]) is a Dutch surname. The word van is equivalent to the English "of" and the German von, hence it usually is not capitalized in names. The similar name, Buren, is a city or estate in the Netherlands which was ruled by the Egmond family. Dutch nobles were commonly named after their possessions. Literally translated, the Dutch word buren means "neighbours". The surname van Buren that sometimes is used by the Dutch royal house, is related.

The name van Beuren may refer to:

- Amadee J. van Beuren (1880–1938), American film producer
  - Van Beuren Studios, American animation studio
- Frederick T. van Beuren, Jr. (1876–1943), American physician, surgeon, educator, and writer
- Hope Hill van Beuren, American billionaire
- John Mohlman van Beuren, American founder of Quan-Tech Laboratories, Inc. and owner two homes built by Bauhaus architects Bertrand Goldberg and Ludwig Mies van der Rohe
- Michael van Beuren, American Bauhaus designer of furniture

== See also ==
- Beuren (disambiguation)
- Van Buren (surname)
- Van Buuren (surname)
