= Bora (Turkish name) =

- Pronunciation: [ˈboɾa]
- Gender: Masculine
- Language: Turkish

Origin
- Origin: Turkish
- Meaning: Storm, a strong wind that usually brings rain

Other names
- Variant form: Boran

Bora is a common masculine Turkish given name that means "storm" or "a strong wind that usually brings rain".

== Etymology ==
According to the Turkish Language Association, the name Bora derives from the Italian word borea, which ultimately related to the Ancient Greek Βορέας. Some etymological studies also suggest a possible connection to the Proto-Turkic *bora-, meaning "storm". It is of the same root with the Turkish burağan, meaning "whirlwind" or "tornado", and is cognate with Bashkir буран (buran), Crimean Tatar boran, Kazakh боран (boran) and Turkmen boran. In addition, it is possible that it is related to the Mongolian бороо, signifying "rain".

== People ==
=== Given name ===
- Bora Aksu, London-based Turkish fashion designer
- Bora Dağtekin, award-winning German author and screenwriter of Turkish descent
- Bora Karaca, Turkish roadie/mascot for American rock band Tally Hall
- Bora Körk, Turkish footballer
- Bora Ölmez, Turkish mathematician

=== Pseudonym ===
- Ekrem Bora (1934–2012), Turkish film actor
