= Buran bint al-Hasan ibn Sahl =

Wife of Abbasid caliph Al-Ma'mun

Buran bint al-Hasan ibn Sahl خديجة بنت الحسن بن سهل

Wife of the Abbasid caliph
- Tenure: December 825 – 7 August 833
- Born: 6 December 807; Khorasan, Abbasid Caliphate
- Died: 21 September 884 (aged 76); Baghdad, Abbasid Caliphate
- Burial: Baghdad
- Spouse: Al-Ma'mun
Names
- Khadija Buran bint al-Hasan ibn Sahl
- Religion: Islam

Buran bint al-Hasan ibn Sahl (Arabic: بوران بنت الحسن بن سهل; 6 December 807 – 21 September 884) also known as Khadija bint al-Hasan ibn Sahl (خديجة بنت الحسن بن سهل), was one of the wives of the Abbasid caliph Al-Ma'mun.

Buran was al-Ma'mun's second wife, She was the daughter of al-Ma'mun's officer, al-Hasan ibn Sahl. She was born as Khadija. She was born on 6 December 807.

She was the daughter of al-Hasan ibn Sahl, a senior official of al-Ma'mun, and likely named after the Sasanian queen Boran (r. 630–632).

She was betrothed to the Caliph at the age of ten. The wedding took place when she was seventeen, in December 825, at Wasit. The wedding was so pompously celebrated that it became proverbial and was called by the name of “The Invitation of Islam”, Daʿwat al-Islām. Al-Ma'mun married her in 817, and consummated marriage with her in December 825-January 826 in the town of Fam al-Silh.

Buran entered the Caliph's Harem and became one of three wives of the caliph. Living a secluded life in the harem, only a few things is known about her. She is known to have asked the caliph to pardon uncle Ibrahim ibn al-Mahdi. She also asked him to allow Zubaidah bint Ja'far to go on the Hajj.

She was given the Hasani Palace on the Tigris by her father, and retired to it when she was widowed in 833. She lived there until her death on 21 September 884.

Buran is credited with the creation of the dish burani.

== See also ==
- Umm Isa bint Musa al-Hadi
- Arib al-Ma'muniyya

== Sources ==
- Ibn al-Sāʿī (2017). Consorts of the Caliphs: Women and the Court of Baghdad. Translated by Shawkat M. Toorawa and the Editors of the Library of Arabic Literature. Introduction by Julia Bray, Foreword by Marina Warner. New York: New York University Press. ISBN 978-1-4798-0477-1.
- Abbas, Ihsan (1989). "BŪRĀN". In Yarshater, Ehsan (ed.). Encyclopædia Iranica. Vol. IV/5: Brick–Burial II. London and New York: Routledge & Kegan Paul. pp. 553–554. ISBN 978-0-71009-128-4.
