= Borana =

Borana or Borena may refer to:

- Borana Oromo people, a moiety of the Oromo people
- Borana language, a language spoken by the Borana people
- Borena Zone, one of the 17 zones of the Oromia Region of Ethiopia
- Borena National Park, a national park in Oromia Region
- Borena, Ethiopia, a district in South Wollo Zone, Amhara Region
- Borana, a variant breed or type of the Abyssinian horse
