= County of Buren =

Historic state

Coordinates: 51°58′N 05°25′E

County of Buren Graafschap Buren (nl)
- c. 994–1795
- Flag Coat of arms

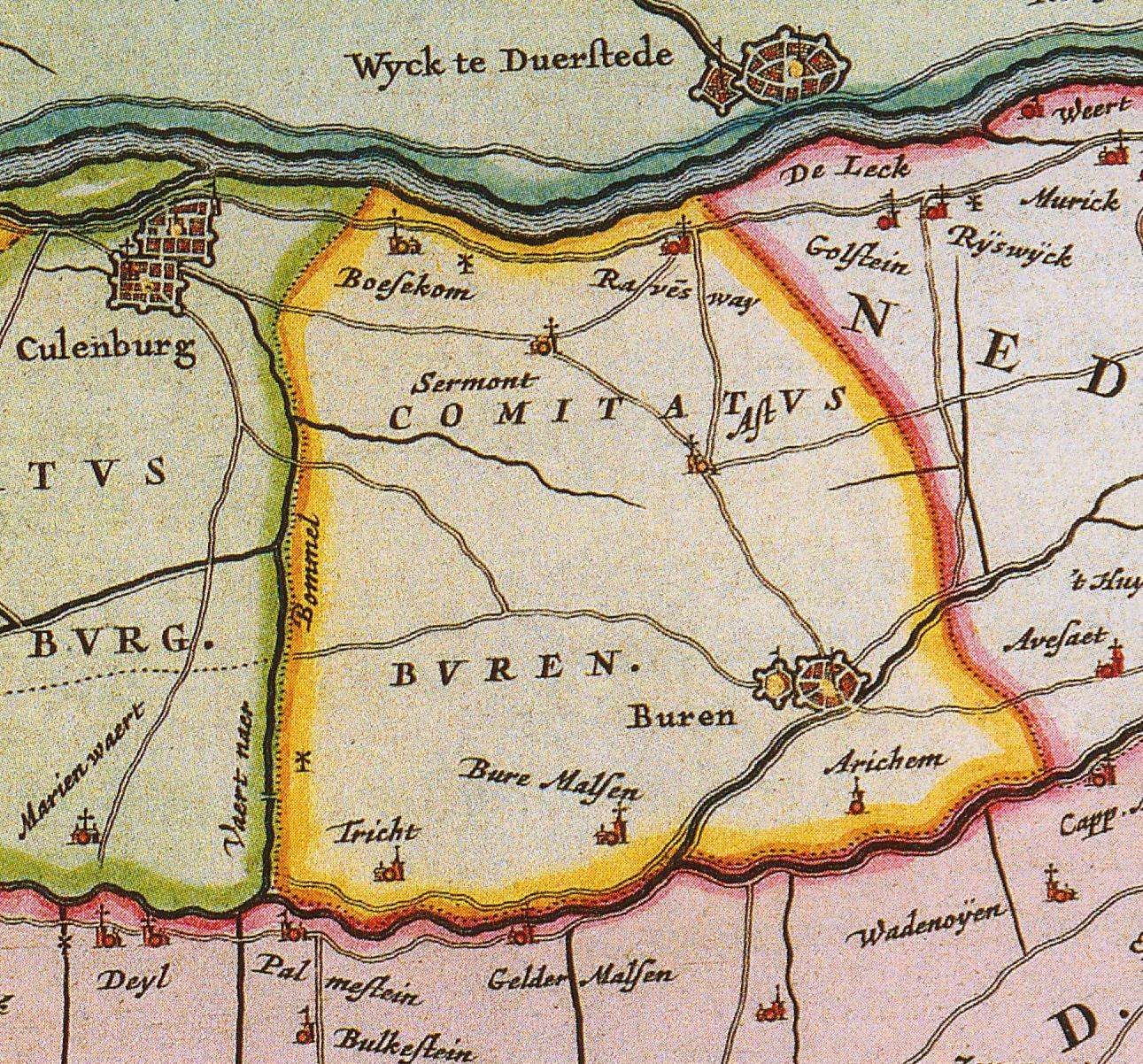
- Map of the County of Buren around 1665, County of Buren highlighted in yellow
- Status: County
- Capital: Buren
- Common languages: Dutch
- Historical era: Middle Ages, Renaissance
  - Established: (994) 1498
  - Disestablished: 1795
| Preceded by | Succeeded by |
| Francia | Batavian Republic |

The Buren County was a territory situated in what is now the Dutch province of Gelderland.

It was an independent county until the establishment of the Batavian Republic in 1795. Although it was not formally part of the United Provinces, in practice it was governed by it.

== Lordship of Buren ==
The Lordship of Buren was a result of the division of the county of Teisterbant in 994. The manor was owned by the van Buren family. Their coat of arms was also the Lordship's and the city's ones. The lordship's original fortress' Buren received city rights in 1395 by the knights Allard, Asch and Erichem; but through the acquisition, war and marriage, a number of villages were grown, including Beusichem, Zoelmond, Buurmalsen and Tricht. By this marriages policy, in 1472 the lordship's ownership went to the House of Egmond.

== County ==
Buren was elevated to a county in 1498 by Emperor Maximilian of Austria. Later Charles V wanted to raise Buren to a duchy, but Maximilian of Egmond replied: "I'd rather be a rich count than a poor duke" and thus Buren remained a county.

William of Orange in 1551 married the heiress Anna of Egmont, Countess of Buren, bring the county in the ownership of the House of Orange-Nassau. Since then, members of this house also carry the title of Count of Buren.

Mary, the third child of William of Orange and Anna of Egmont, founded in 1612 the orphanage in Buren, serving the following 350 years. There is also the Museum of the Royal Military Police. The town of Buren has been declared protected townscape.

With the advent of the Batavian Republic, the county ceased to exist. However, the head of the House of Orange-Nassau (the Dutch Head of State) is named, among other titles, Count or Countess of Buren and Leerdam.

== List of the counts of Buren and Leerdam ==
=== House of Egmont ===
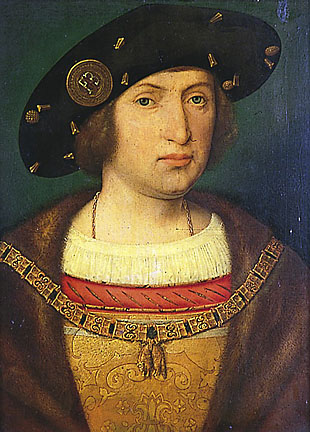
1521–1539 Floris, son of Frederick.

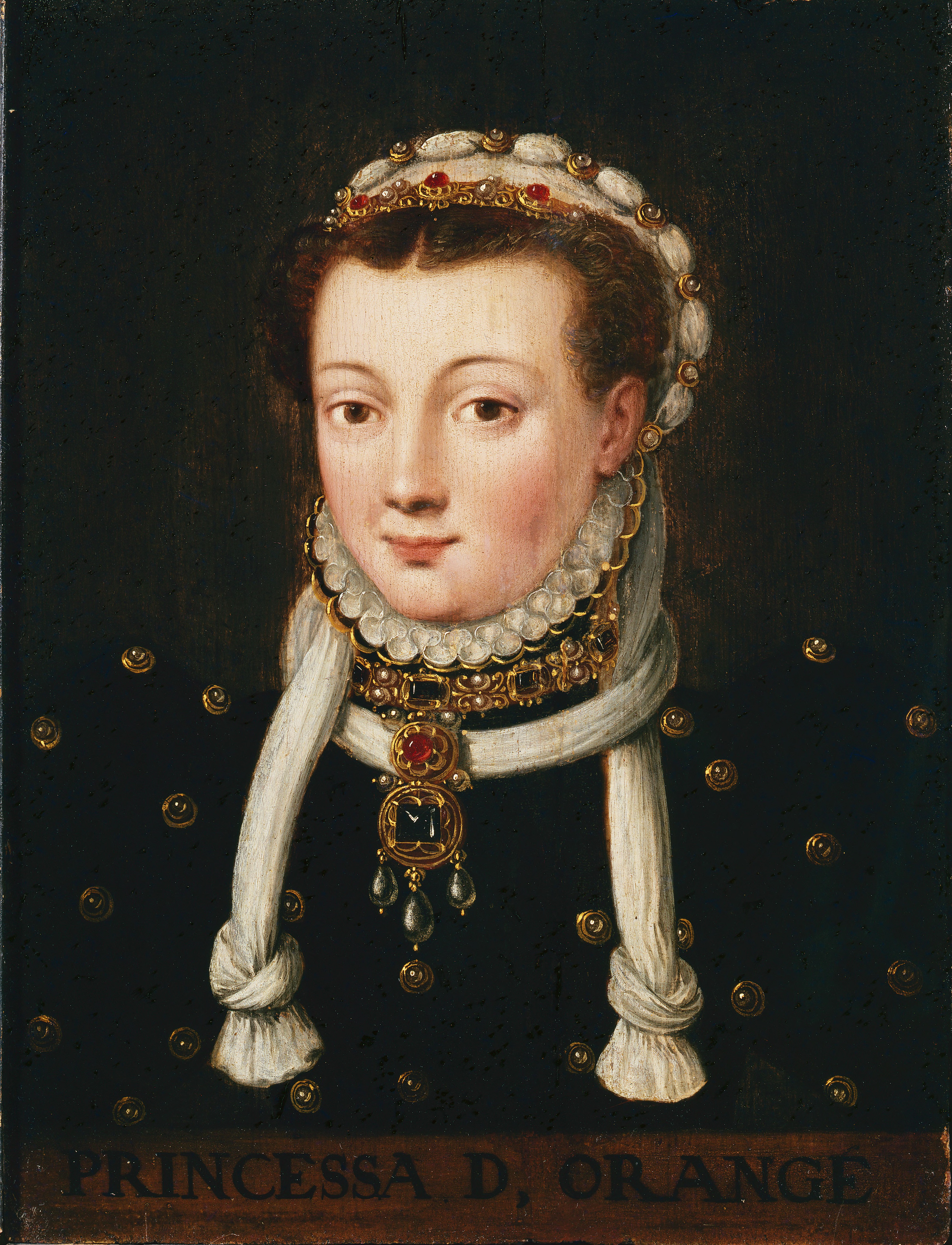
1548–1558 Anna, daughter of Maximilian, married since 1551 William I of Orange.

=== House of Orange-Nassau ===
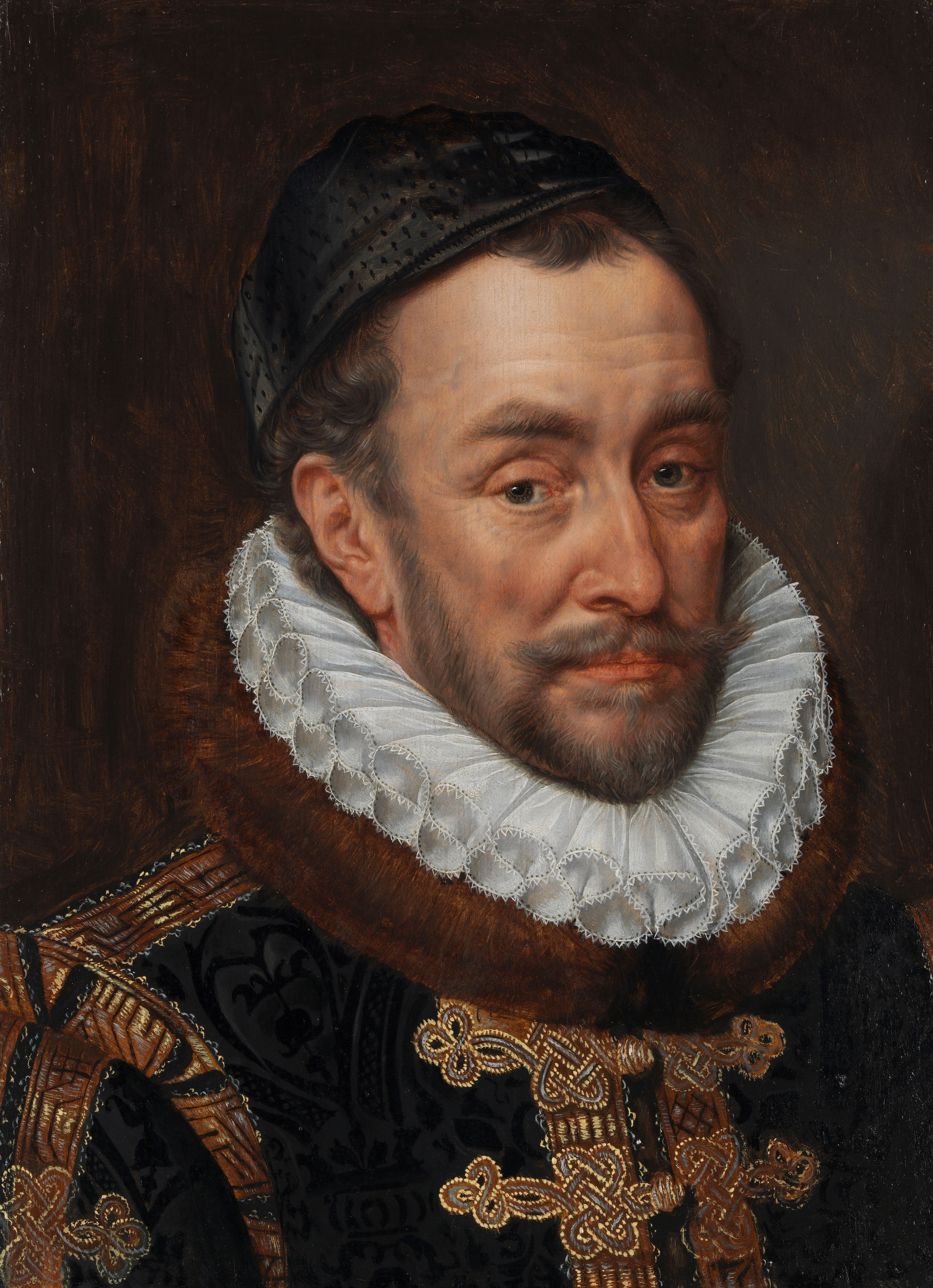
1551–1584 William I.

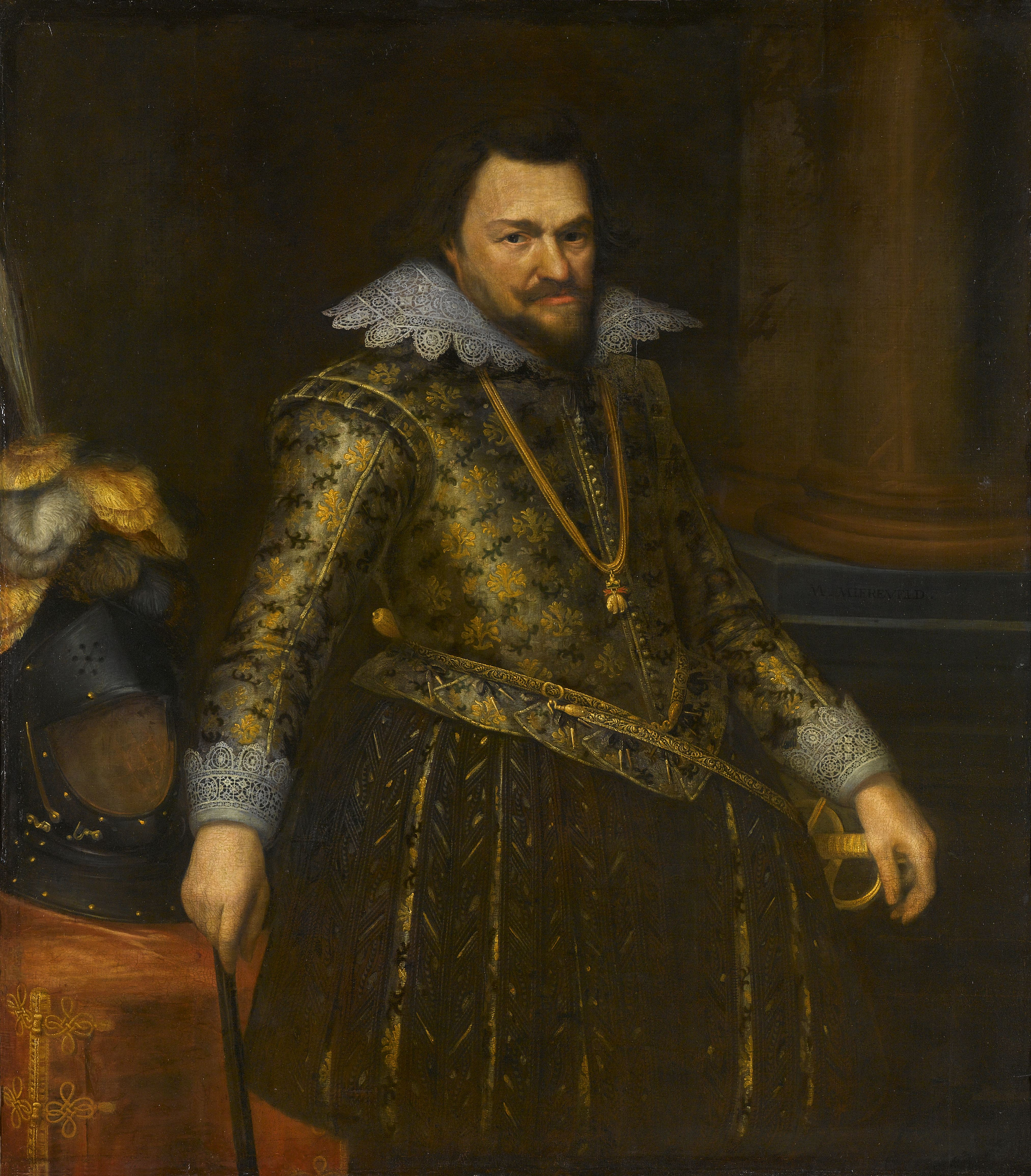
1584–1618 William Philip.

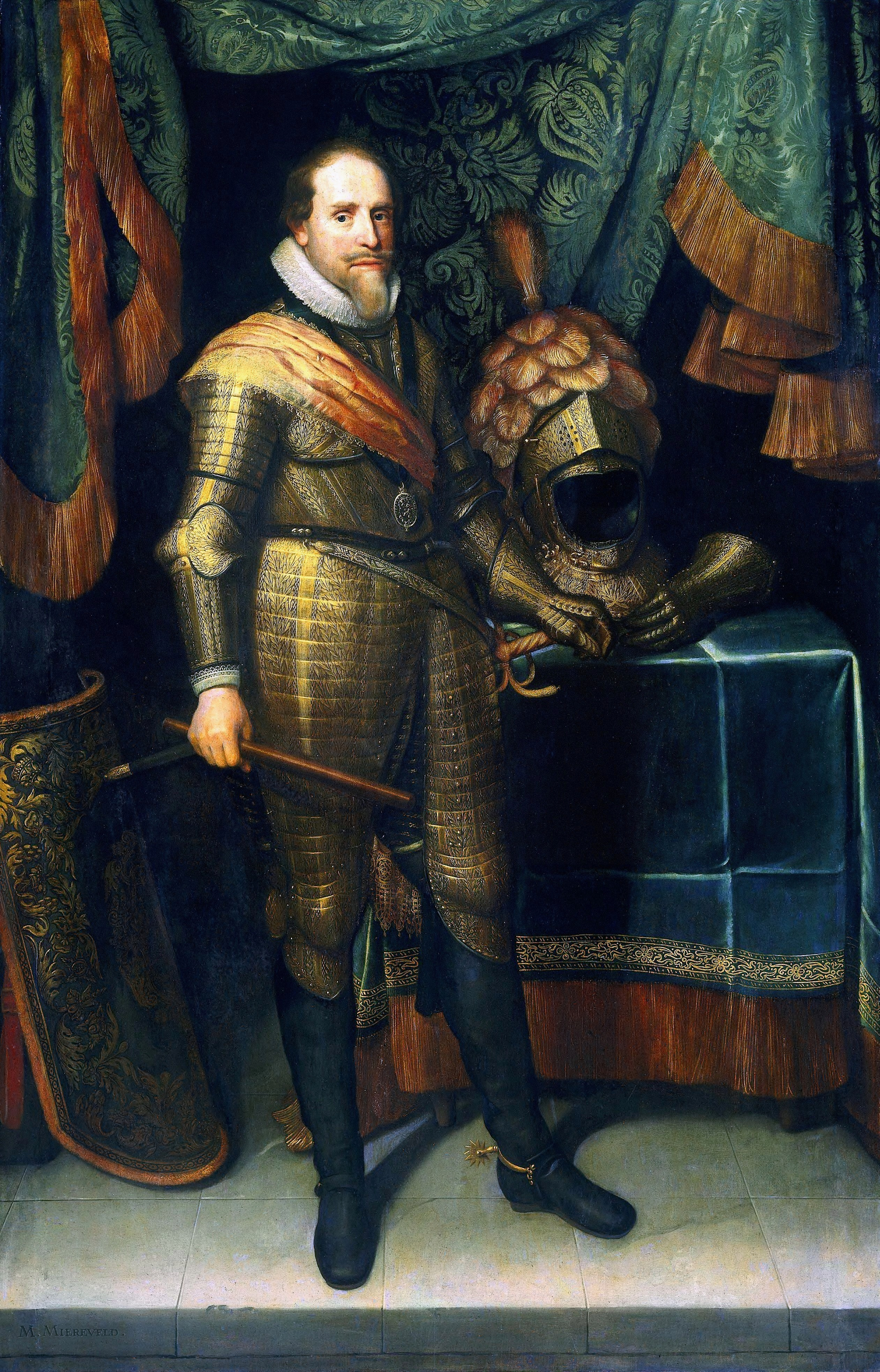
1618–1625 Maurice.

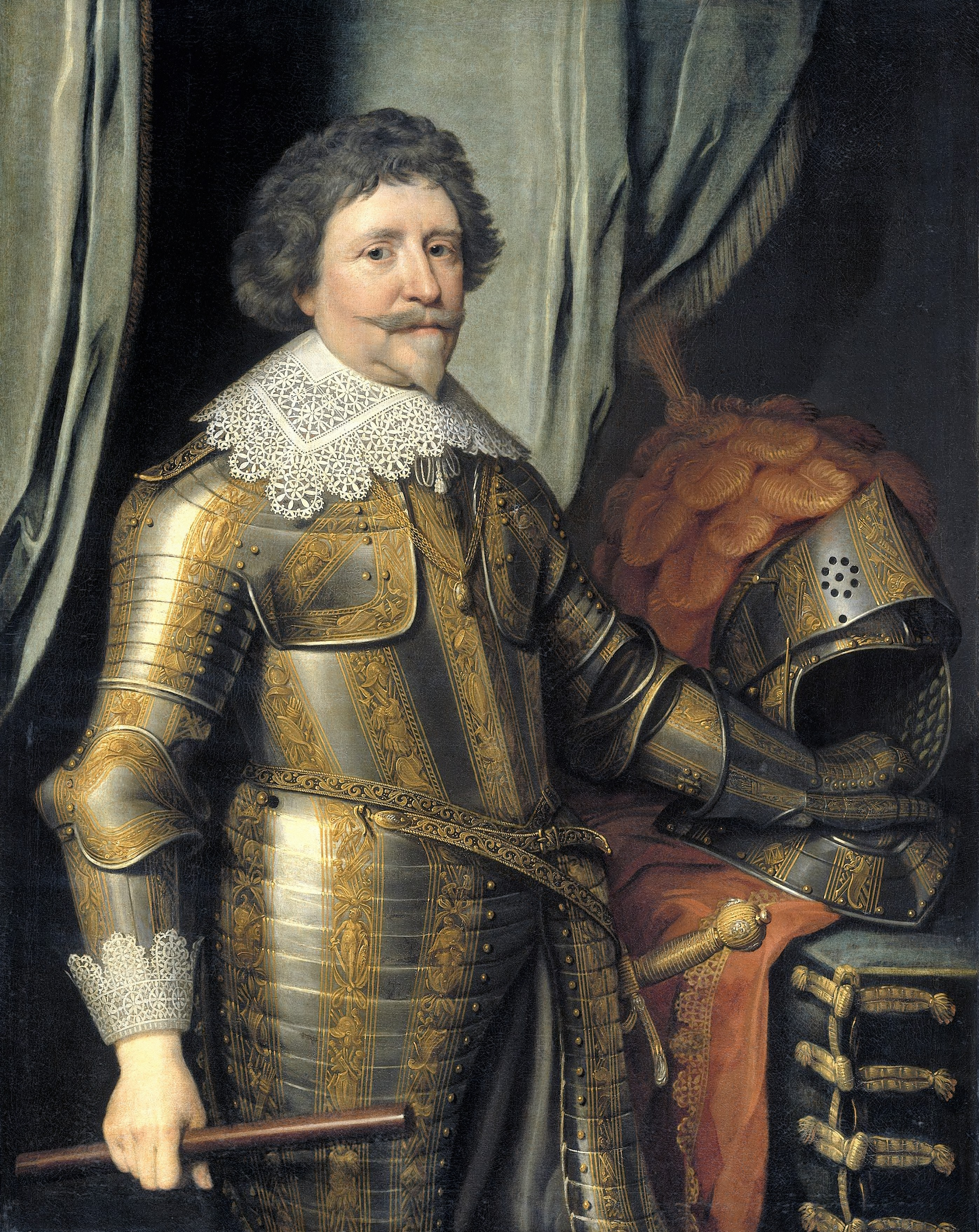
1625–1647 Frederick II Henry.

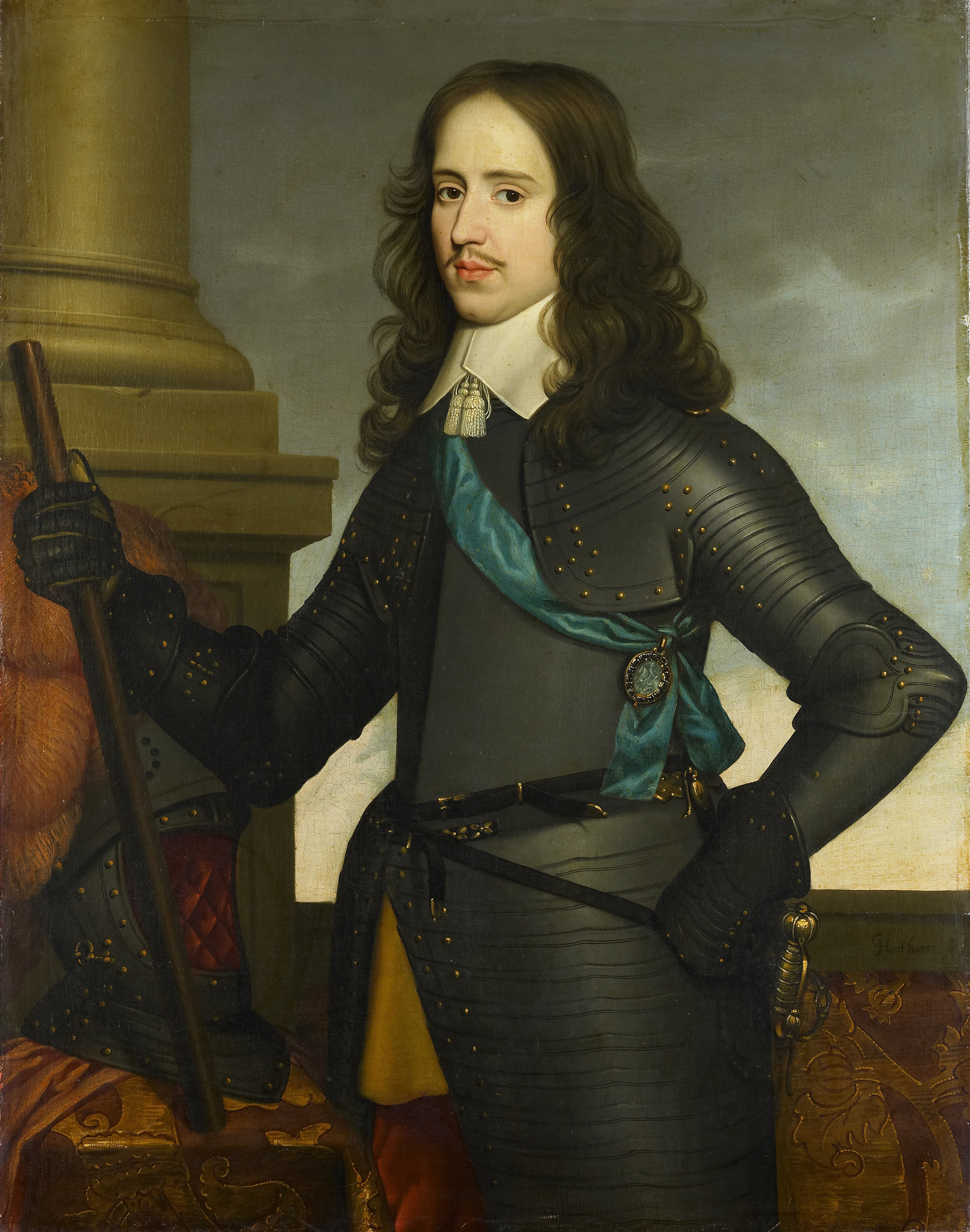
1647–1650 Willem II.

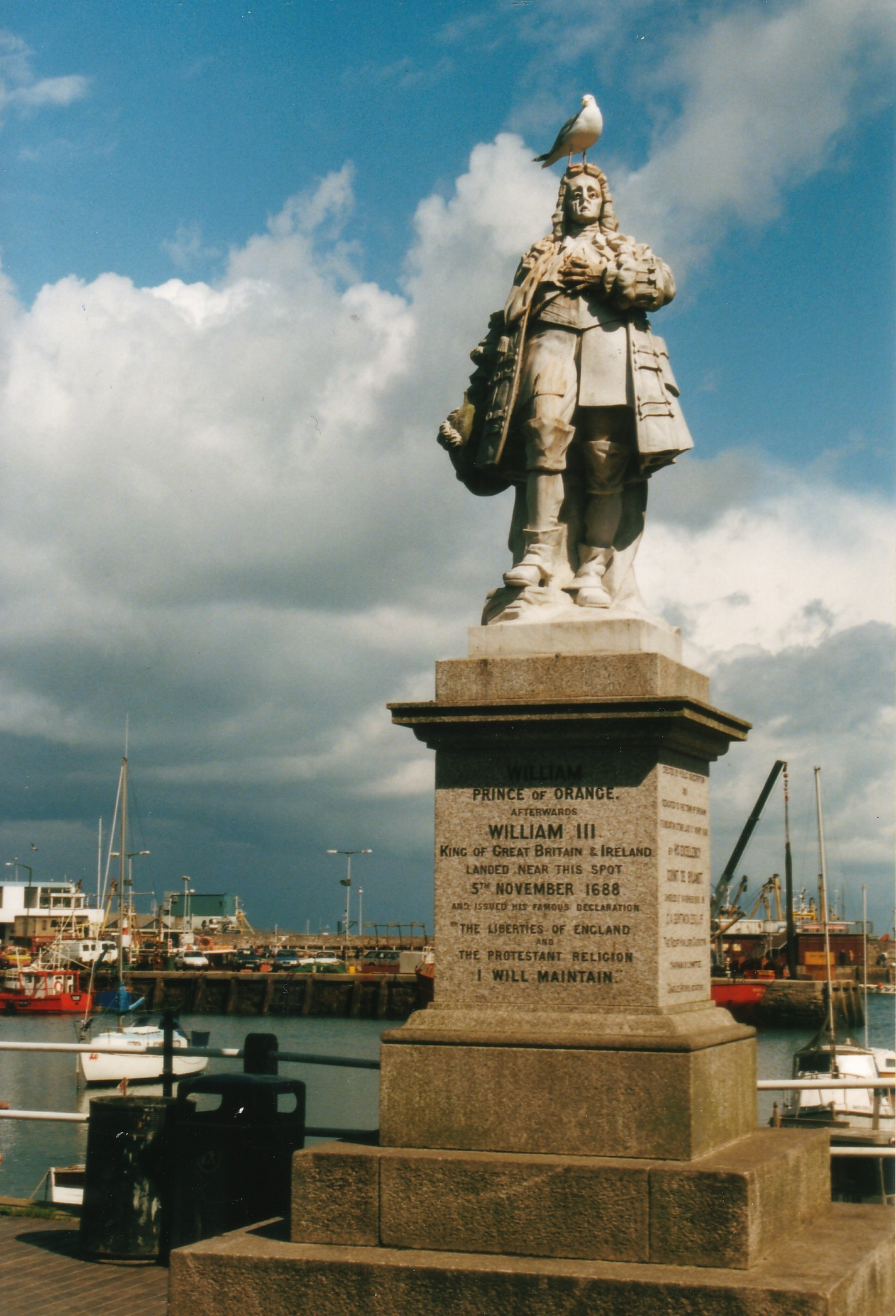
1650–1702 William III, since 1689, King of England.

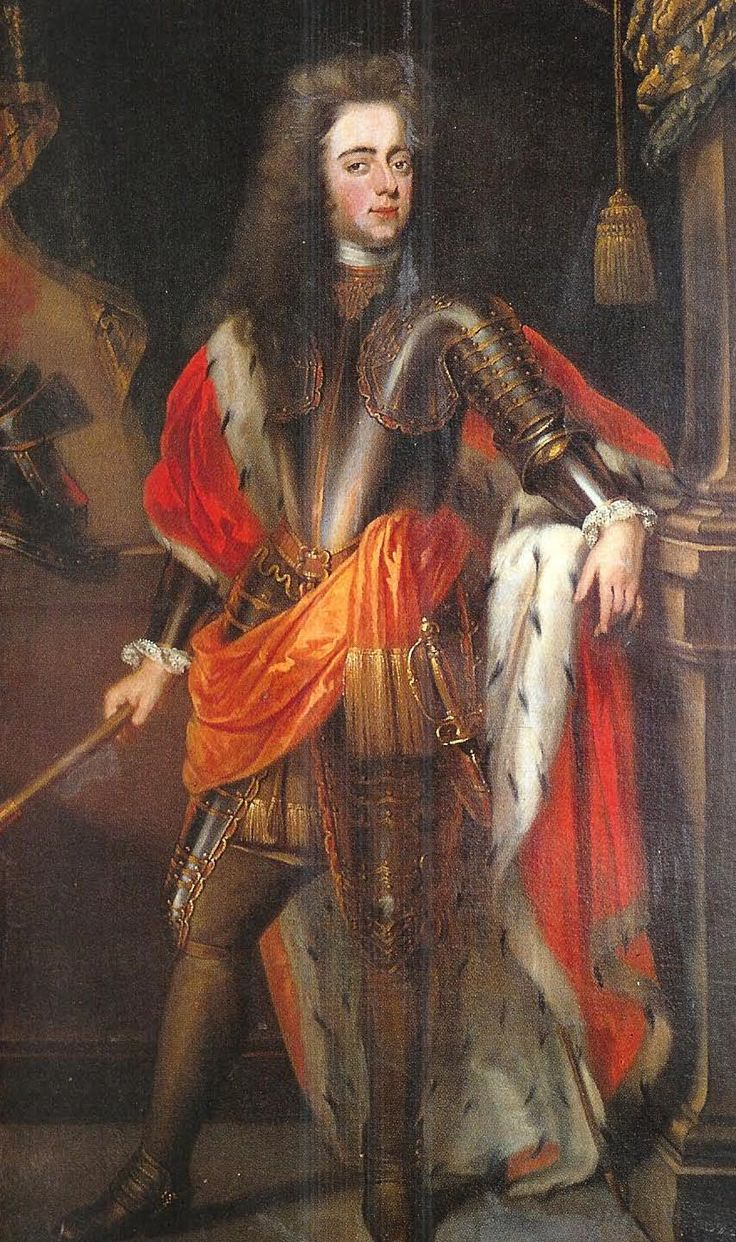
1702–1711 Johan Willem Friso.

1711–1751 William IV.

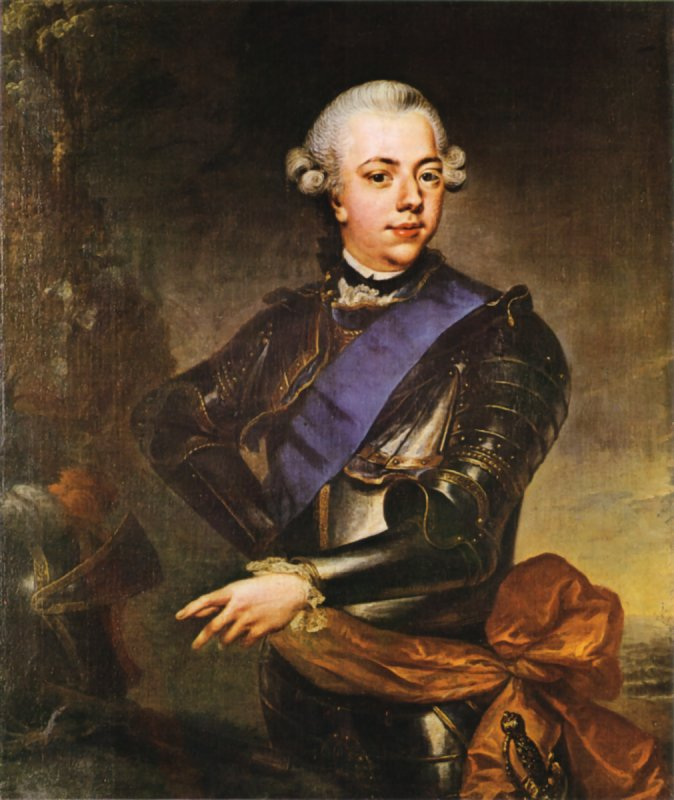
1751–1795 William V.

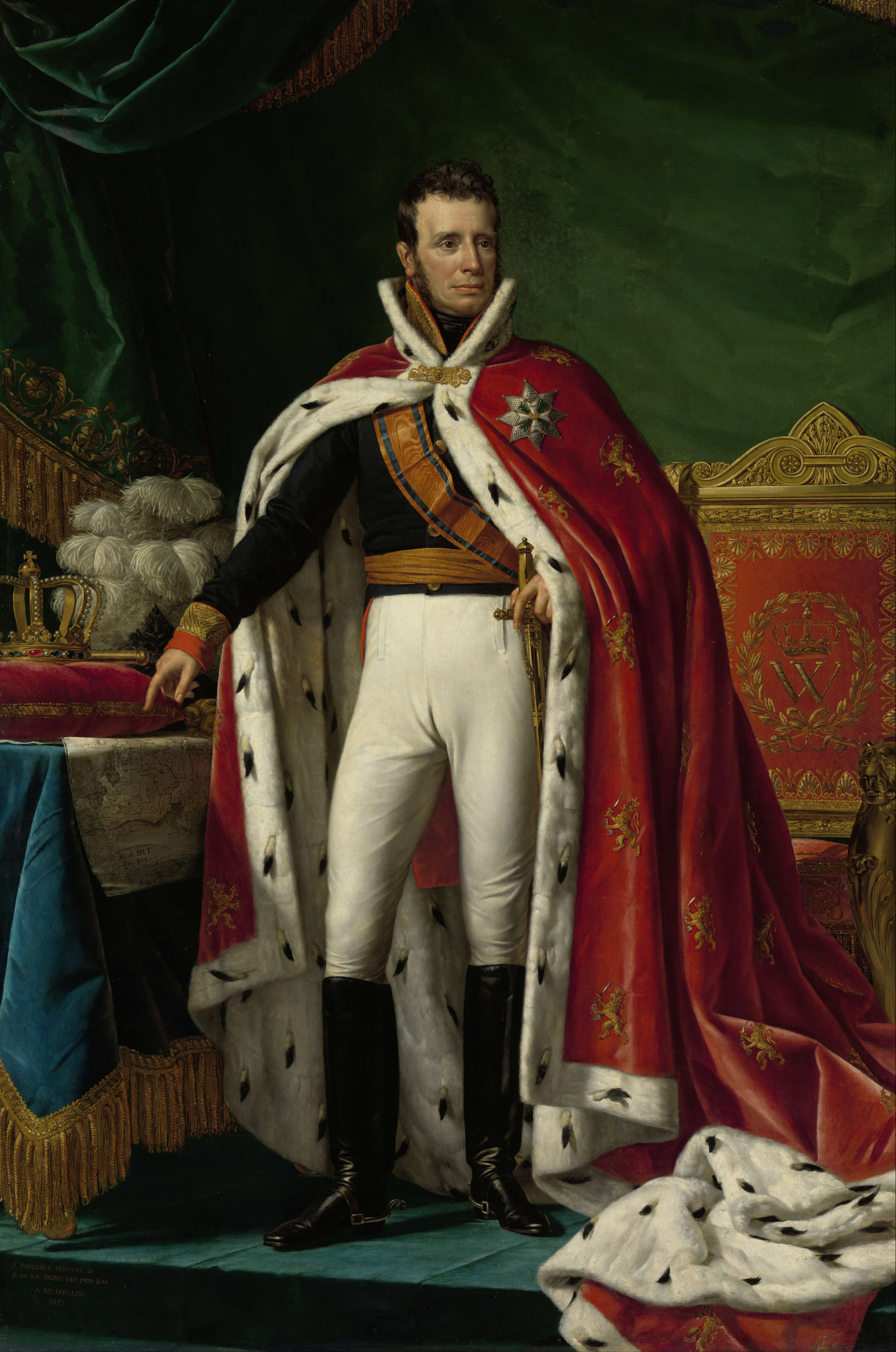
1813–1840 William VI.

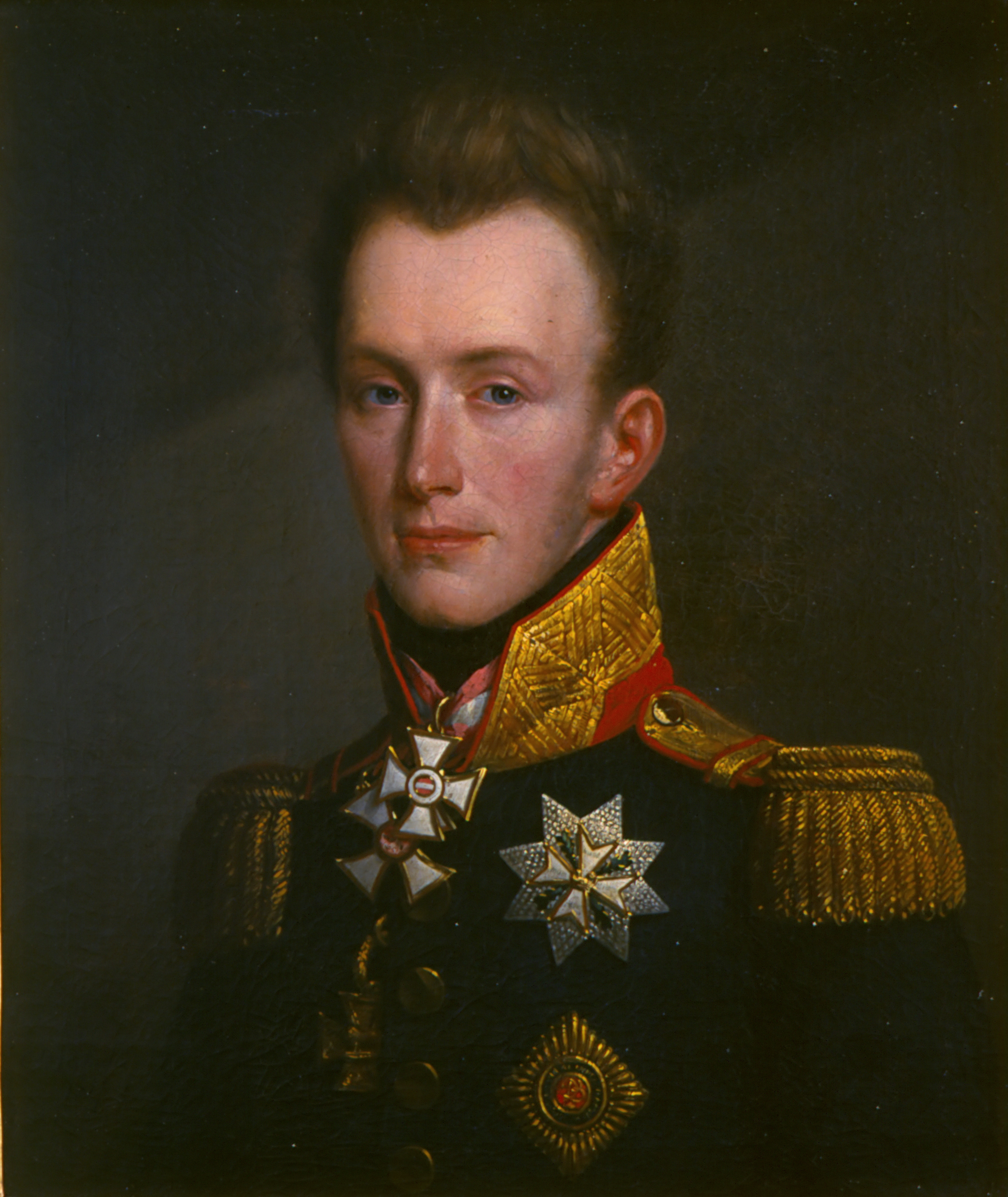
1840–1849 William VII.

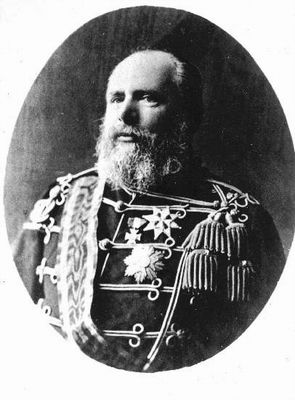
1849–1890 William VIII.

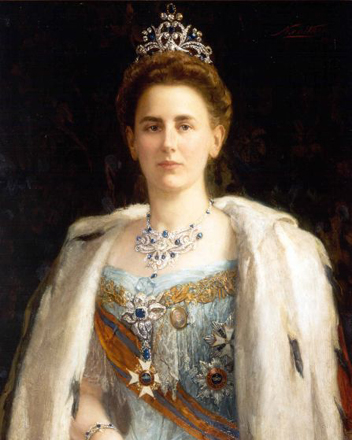
1890–1948 Wilhelmina.

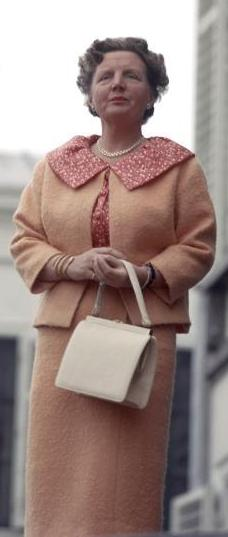
1948–1980 Juliana.

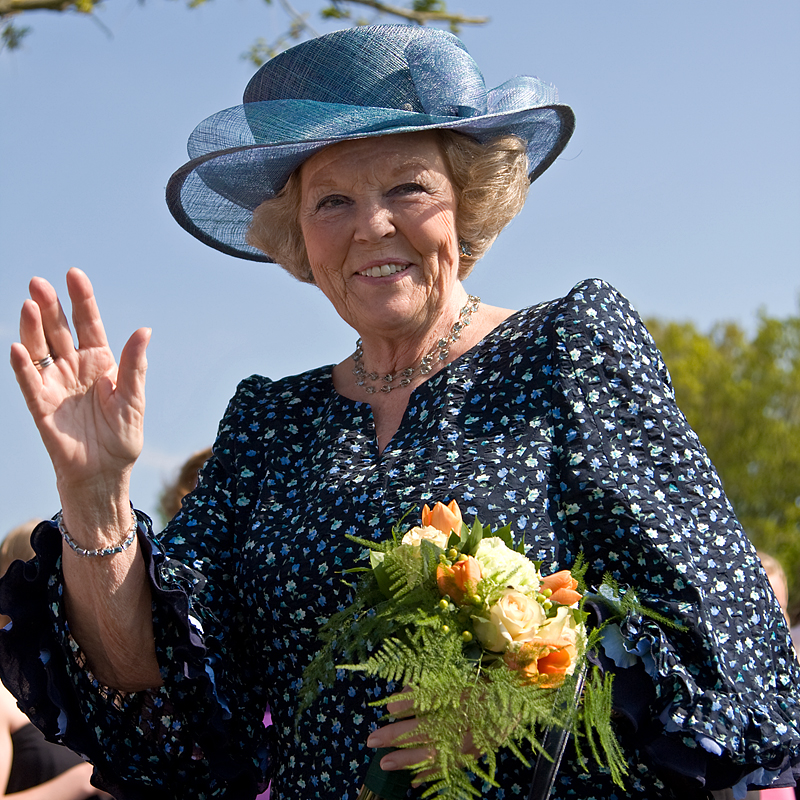
1980–2013 Beatrix.

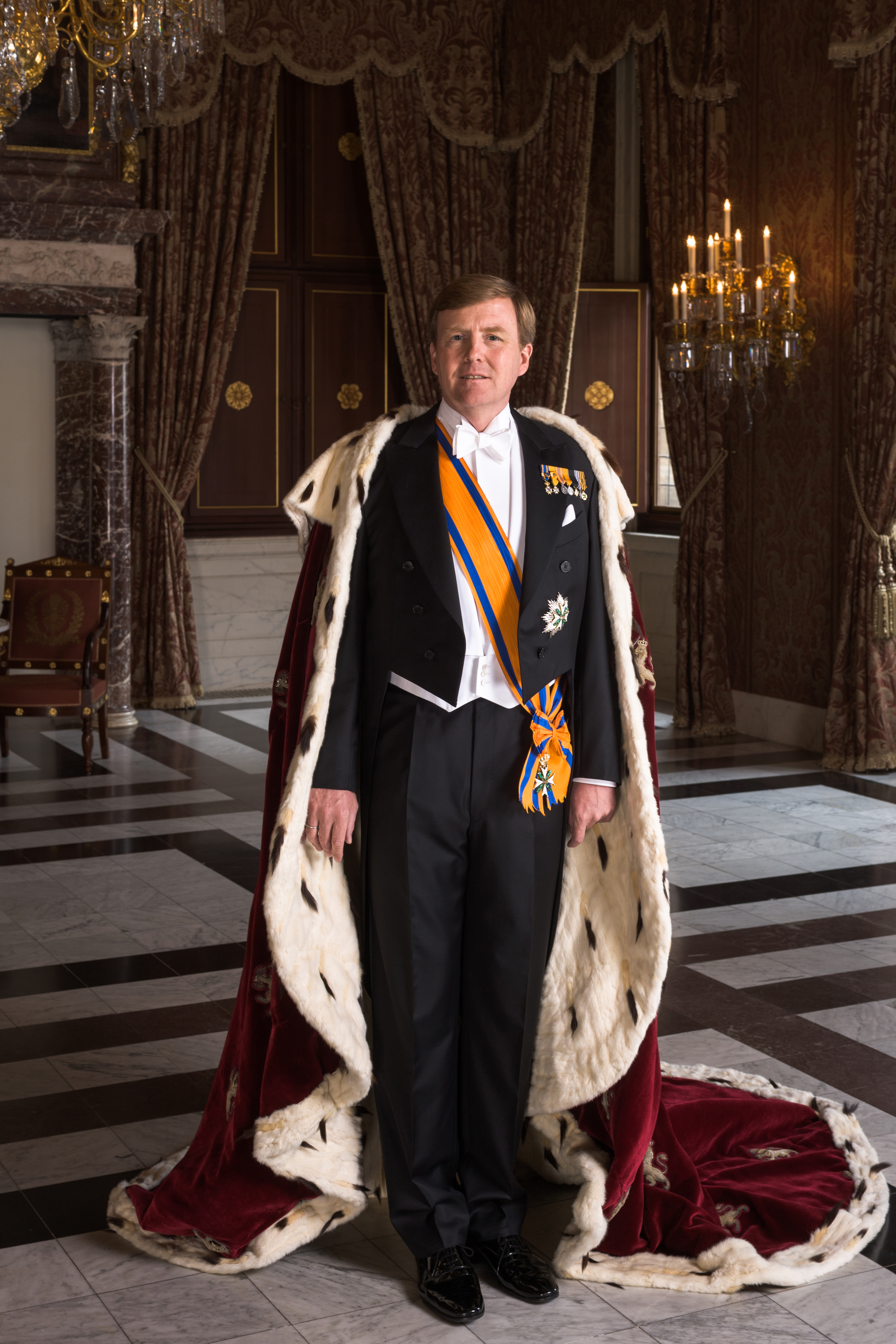
2013– Willem-Alexander.

== See also ==
- van Buren surname
- House of Egmond
