= Purang =

Purang or Burang may refer to:

- Purang County, county in Tibet
- Purang Town, town in Purang County
- Burang, Iran, a village in South Khorasan Province, Iran
- Purang apin, a rice dish of the Mising people
