= Van Buren (surname) =

Van Buren (pronounced [vɑm ˈbyːrə(n)]) is a Dutch surname meaning "of/from Buren". Buren is also the Dutch word for "neighbours".

== People ==
- Abigail Van Buren, pen name of the writer(s) of the "Dear Abby" column
- Adeline and Augusta Van Buren, the Van Buren sisters, Australian transcontinental motorcyclists
- Amelia Van Buren (c. 1856–1942), American photographer
- Andrew Van Buren, British performer who specialises in magic, large scale-illusions and juggling
- Anita Van Buren, a fictional character on the television show Law & Order
- Ebert Van Buren (1924–2019), American-Honduran football player
- Edith Van Buren (1858–1914), American socialite and traveler
- Elizabeth Douglas Van Buren (1881–1961), British archaeologist
- James Lyman Van Buren (1837–1866), American army officer and general after the American Civil War
- Jermaine Van Buren (born 1980), Major League Baseball player
- John Van Buren (congressman) (1799–1855), U.S. Representative from New York
- John D. Van Buren (1838–1918), an American civil engineer, naval engineer, lawyer, and politician
- John J. Van Buren (1915–1942), a U.S. Navy officer and pilot who received the Navy Cross and Distinguished Flying Cross
- Mabel Van Buren (1878–1947), American stage and screen actress
- Martin Van Buren (1782–1862), eighth president of the United States (1837–1841)
  - Hannah Van Buren (1783–1819), his wife
  - Abraham Van Buren II (1807–1873), his eldest son
  - Angelica Van Buren (1818–1877), his daughter-in-law (performed the ceremonial duties of First Lady)
  - John Van Buren (1810–1866), his second son
  - Abraham Van Buren I (1737–1817), his father
- Michael Van Buren Jr. (born 2004), American football player
- Mick van Buren (born 1992), Dutch footballer
- Paul Van Buren, Christian theologian and author of the Secular Meaning of the Gospel
- Raeburn van Buren (1891–1987) American magazine and comic strip illustrator
- Steve Van Buren (1920–2012), professional American football player
- William Holme Van Buren (1819–1883), American surgeon

=== Dutch royal family ===
The name (van) "Buren" appears in the history of the Dutch royal house, being the family name of Anna van Egmond en Buren, the first wife of William I of Orange. Borrowing from this heritage, the Dutch royal family have used Count of Buren as a title or the surname "van Buren" in situations requiring anonymity.

- Princess Beatrix (formerly Queen Beatrix), the Countess of Buren (Dutch Gravin van Buren).
- King Willem-Alexander used the alias "Alexander van Buren" or a variant for anonymity purposes. For example, during his University application he used "Alex van Buren". He also registered for the 1986 elfstedentocht as "W A van Buren".

== See also ==
- Van Buuren (surname), Dutch surname of the same origin and pronunciation
- Van Beuren (surname), form of the surname that probably originated in the US
