= Arib al-Ma'muniyya =

Singer and poet of the Abbasid period

- عريب المأمونية
- Born: 797/98; Baghdad, Abbasid Caliphate
- Died: July-August 890/891 (aged 93/96); Samarra, Abbasid Caliphate
- Burial place: Samarra
- Occupations: Singer; Composer; Arabic poet
- Era: Islamic Golden Age (Abbasid era)
- Spouses: al-Amin (until his death 813); al-Ma'mun (814–833)

ʿArīb al-Ma’mūnīya (Arabic: عريب المأمونية, b. 181/797–98, d. 277/890–91) was a qayna (slave trained in the arts of entertainment) of the early Abbasid period, who has been characterised as 'the most famous slave singer to have ever resided at the Baghdad court'. She lived to the age of 96, and her career spanned the courts of five caliphs.

== Life and works ==
Arīb was a wife or concubine of al-Ma'mun. Born in 797, she claimed to be the daughter of Ja'far ibn Yahya, the Barmakid, stolen and sold as a child when the Barmakids fell from power. She was bought by al-Amin, who then took her as a favourite concubine. She was then bought by al-Ma'mun after Amin's death in 813. She was a noted poet, singer, and musician.

The main source for ‘Arīb's life is the tenth-century Kitāb al-Aghānī of Abū ’l-Faraj al-Iṣfahānī:

Like her peers, he tells us, ‘Arīb was versed in poetry, composition and music performance, along with sundry other skills, backgammon, chess and calligraphy among them. Her chosen instrument was the oud, a preference she would pass on to her students, but, above all, it was her singing and composition that stood out. Citing one of his key sources, Ibn al-Mu‘tazz, Abū ’l-Faraj refers to a collection of notebooks (dafātir) and loose sheets (ṣuḥuf) containing her songs. These are said to have numbered around 1,000. As regards her singing, Abū ’l-Faraj declares that she knew no rival among her peers. He groups her, alone among them, with the legendary divas of the earliest Islamic period, the singers known collectively as the Ḥijāzīyāt.

Born in Baghdad, Iraq, ‘Arīb was rumoured in the Middle Ages to be the daughter of vizier Ja'far al-Barmaki, a key member of the Barmakids, and one of the family's domestic servants, Fāṭima. This parentage has been questioned by modern scholars. Either way, she was clearly a slave for important portions of her early life, whether born into slavery or sold into slavery as a ten-year-old following her family's downfall. ‘Arīb's own poetry twice protests at her servile status, and she was manumitted by Abū Isḥāq al-Mu‘taṣim (r. 833–842). She allegedly rose to being the favourite singer of Caliph al-Maʾmūn (r. 813–833).

‘Arīb's surviving oeuvre and associated anecdotes suggest not only her poetic skills, but also a life in which she had a number of relationships with male lovers and patrons, indicating 'that ‘Arīb, like many of her peers, was a concubine as well as a singer when circumstances required'. It appears that she came to maintain a substantial entourage of her own and was a landowner. One of the most famous stories attached to her concerns a singing contest in which she and her singing-girls won against her younger rival Shāriyah and her troupe. The evidence suggests a figure who was 'willful, deeply intelligent, impatient with those of lesser wits and, perhaps inevitably, bemused and often cynical'.

An example of ‘Arīb's verse is the following:

To you treachery is a virtue, you have many faces and ten tongues.
I'm surprised my heart still clings to you in spite of what you put me through.

If the early biographical information is correct, ‘Arīb died at Samarra in July–August 890, aged ninety-six.

== See also ==
- Mukhariq
