= Burren =

Burren can refer to:

- The Burren, an area dominated by karst landscape, in County Clare, Ireland
- Burren National Park, the national park in County Clare, Ireland
- Burren (barony), an historical administrative division of County Clare, Ireland
- Burren (townland), a townland in County Cavan, Ireland
- Burren, County Down, a village in Northern Ireland
- Burren and Cliffs of Moher Geopark, a designated area of geological interest in County Clare, Ireland
- Burren College of Art, an art college in Ballyvaughan, County Clare, Ireland
- Burren Way, an official long-distance walking trail across the Burren
- Burrén and Burrena, twin hills in Aragon, Spain

== See also ==
- Buran (disambiguation)
