= Büren =

Büren may refer to the following places:

== Germany ==
- Büren, Westphalia, a town near Paderborn, North Rhine-Westphalia
- Büren, a village in the municipality of Lotte, North Rhine-Westphalia
- Büren, a village in the municipality of Neustadt am Rübenberge, Lower Saxony

== Switzerland ==
- Büren, Aargau, part of Gansingen in the canton of Aargau
- Büren nid dem Bach, in the canton of Nidwalden
- Büren ob dem Bach, in the Canton of Nidwalden
- Büren, Solothurn, in the canton of Solothurn
- Büren District, a former district in the canton of Bern
- Büren an der Aare in the canton of Bern
- Büren zum Hof, in the canton of Bern
- Büron, in the canton of Lucerne

== Mongolia ==
- Büren, Töv, a sum in Töv Province

== See also ==
- Buren (disambiguation)
- Bühren, a municipality in Lower Saxony, Germany
- Beuren (disambiguation)
