= Boran (name) =

- Gender: Masculine

Origin
- Language: Greek
- Origin: βορέας
- Meaning: north wind

Other names
- Cognate: Bora

Boran is a masculine Turkish given name, derived from Bora, a wind in areas near the Adriatic Sea. Boran is also a surname. Notable people with the name include:

== Given name ==
- Boran Kuzum (born 1992), Turkish actor

== Surname ==
- Behice Boran, Turkish Marxist, politician, author and sociologist
- Orhan Boran, Turkish radio and TV host
- Pat Boran (born 1963), Irish poet
