= Michael Hamilton Morgan =

American writer (born 1951)

- Born: 1951 (age 74–75); Charlotte, North Carolina, U.S.
- Occupations: Political scientist, writer, diplomat

Academic background
- Education: University of Virginia
- Website: losthistoryonline.com

Michael Hamilton Morgan is a political scientist and a novelist and non-fiction author from the US. He wrote a book named Lost History and Arabia: The Golden Ages. Book written: Lost history (The enduring legacy of Muslim scientist, thinkers, and Artists

== Professional career ==
Michael Hamilton Morgan is a novelist and nonfiction author. His book Lost History: the Enduring Legacy of Muslim Scientists, was translated into various languages including Arabic, Indonesian and Korean.

== Books ==
- Lost History: the Enduring Legacy of Muslim Scientists, This book has been translated into various languages including Arabic, Indonesian and Korean.
- Arabia: In Search of the Golden Ages Published in fall 2010 by Insight Editions
- Collision with History: the Search for John F. Kennedy’s PT 109 This book and TV documentary was released by National Geographic and MSNBC in 2002.
