= Van Buren Township =

Van Buren Township may refer to:

== Arkansas ==
- Van Buren Township, Crawford County, Arkansas
- Van Buren Township, Newton County, Arkansas
- Van Buren Township, Union County, Arkansas

== Indiana ==
- Van Buren Township, Brown County, Indiana
- Van Buren Township, Clay County, Indiana
- Van Buren Township, Daviess County, Indiana
- Van Buren Township, Fountain County, Indiana
- Van Buren Township, Grant County, Indiana
- Van Buren Township, Kosciusko County, Indiana
- Van Buren Township, LaGrange County, Indiana
- Van Buren Township, Madison County, Indiana
- Van Buren Township, Monroe County, Indiana
- Van Buren Township, Pulaski County, Indiana
- Van Buren Township, Shelby County, Indiana

== Iowa ==
- Van Buren Township, Jackson County, Iowa
- Van Buren Township, Keokuk County, Iowa
- Van Buren Township, Lee County, Iowa
- Van Buren Township, Van Buren County, Iowa

== Michigan ==
- Van Buren Township, Wayne County, Michigan

== Minnesota ==
- Van Buren Township, St. Louis County, Minnesota

== Missouri ==
- Van Buren Township, Newton County, Missouri, in Newton County, Missouri
- Van Buren Township, Wright County, Missouri
- Van Buren Township, Jackson County, Missouri

== Ohio ==
- Van Buren Township, Darke County, Ohio
- Van Buren Township, Hancock County, Ohio
- Van Buren Township, Montgomery County, Ohio
- Van Buren Township, Putnam County, Ohio
- Van Buren Township, Shelby County, Ohio

== See also ==
- Van Buren (disambiguation)
