= Van Buren Township, LaGrange County, Indiana =

Van Buren Township
- Township
- Coordinates: 41°43′51″N 85°34′21″W
- Country: United States
- State: Indiana
- County: LaGrange

Government
  - Type: Indiana township

Area
  - Total: 38.11 sq mi (98.7 km^{2})
  - Land: 37.64 sq mi (97.5 km^{2})
  - Water: 0.47 sq mi (1.2 km^{2})
- Elevation: 833 ft (254 m)

Population (2020)
  - Total: 4,208
  - Density: 111.8/sq mi (43.16/km^{2})
- FIPS code: 18-78506
- GNIS feature ID: 453948

Van Buren Township is one of eleven townships in LaGrange County, Indiana. As of the 2020 census, its population was 4,208, up from 3,439 at the previous census.

According to the 2020 "ACS 5-Year Estimates Data Profiles", 39.1% of the township's population spoke only English, while 60.7 spoke an "other [than Spanish] Indo-European language" (basically Pennsylvania German/German).

== History ==
Van Buren Township was organized in 1837, and named for president elect Martin Van Buren.

== Geography ==
According to the 2010 census, the township has a total area of 38.11 square miles (98.7 km^{2}), of which 37.64 square miles (97.5 km^{2}) (or 98.77%) is land and 0.47 square miles (1.2 km^{2}) (or 1.23%) is water.

== Demographics ==
Historical population
Census	Pop.	Note	%±
1920	871		—
1930	806		−7.5%
1940	920		14.1%
1950	974		5.9%
1960	1,032		6.0%
1970	1,575		52.6%
1980	2,204		39.9%
1990	2,611		18.5%
2000	3,446		32.0%
2010	3,439		−0.2%
2020	4,208		22.4%
2024 (est.)	4,320		2.7%
U.S. Censuses:
