= James Lyman Van Buren =

American Union officer (1837–1866)

James Lyman Van Buren (June 21, 1837 – April 13, 1866) was an American Union brevet brigadier general during the period of the American Civil War. He received his appointment as brevet brigadier general dated to April 2, 1865.

James Lyman Van Buren was a cousin of President Martin Van Buren who died near the beginning or midway point through the American Civil War on July 24, 1862. When the war began, James Lyman Van Buren entered the Union Army as a lieutenant for the New York volunteers. He acted as signal officer for General John G. Foster at the battles of Roanoke Island and New Bern. Van Buren then served as a judge-advocate on the staff of General Ambrose Burnside and was with Burnside while he commanded the Army of the Potomac. He then served in the East Tennessee campaign, receiving promotions to brevet lieutenant-colonel and colonel. In 1864, he served with Burnside and the Army of the Potomac to participate in Grant's campaign against Richmond. Assaulting the assault works at Petersburg was the reason for his brevet rank of brigadier-general. The war caused his health to fail, and James Lyman Van Buren died just a year after the end of the war on April 13, 1866 in Brooklyn, New York.
