= Borani =

Iranian appetizer

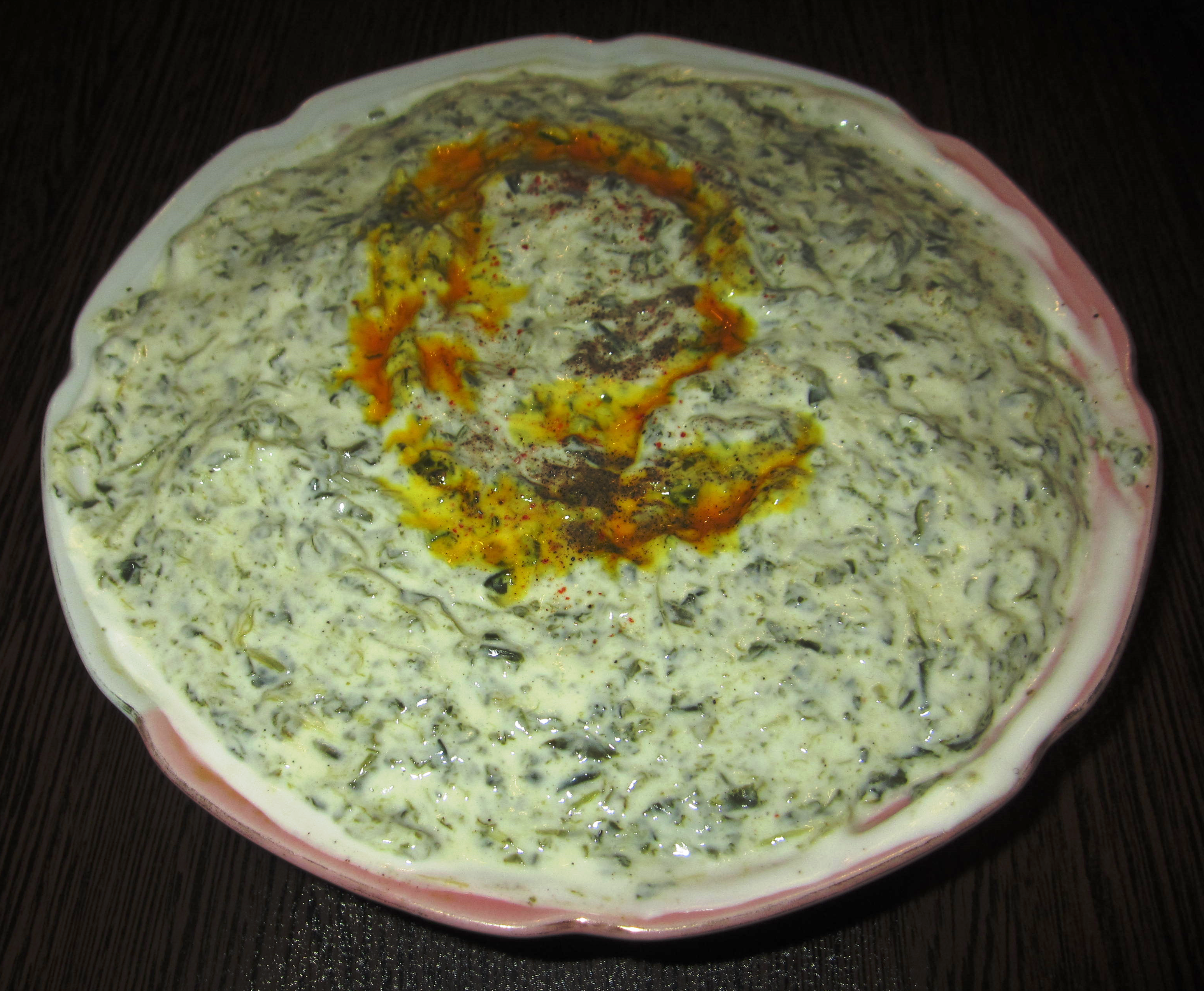
- made from yogurt and spinach, Saffron.
- Course: Salad, Dessert
- Place of origin: Iran (Persia)
- Serving temperature: Cold
- Main ingredients: Yogurt, Vegetables

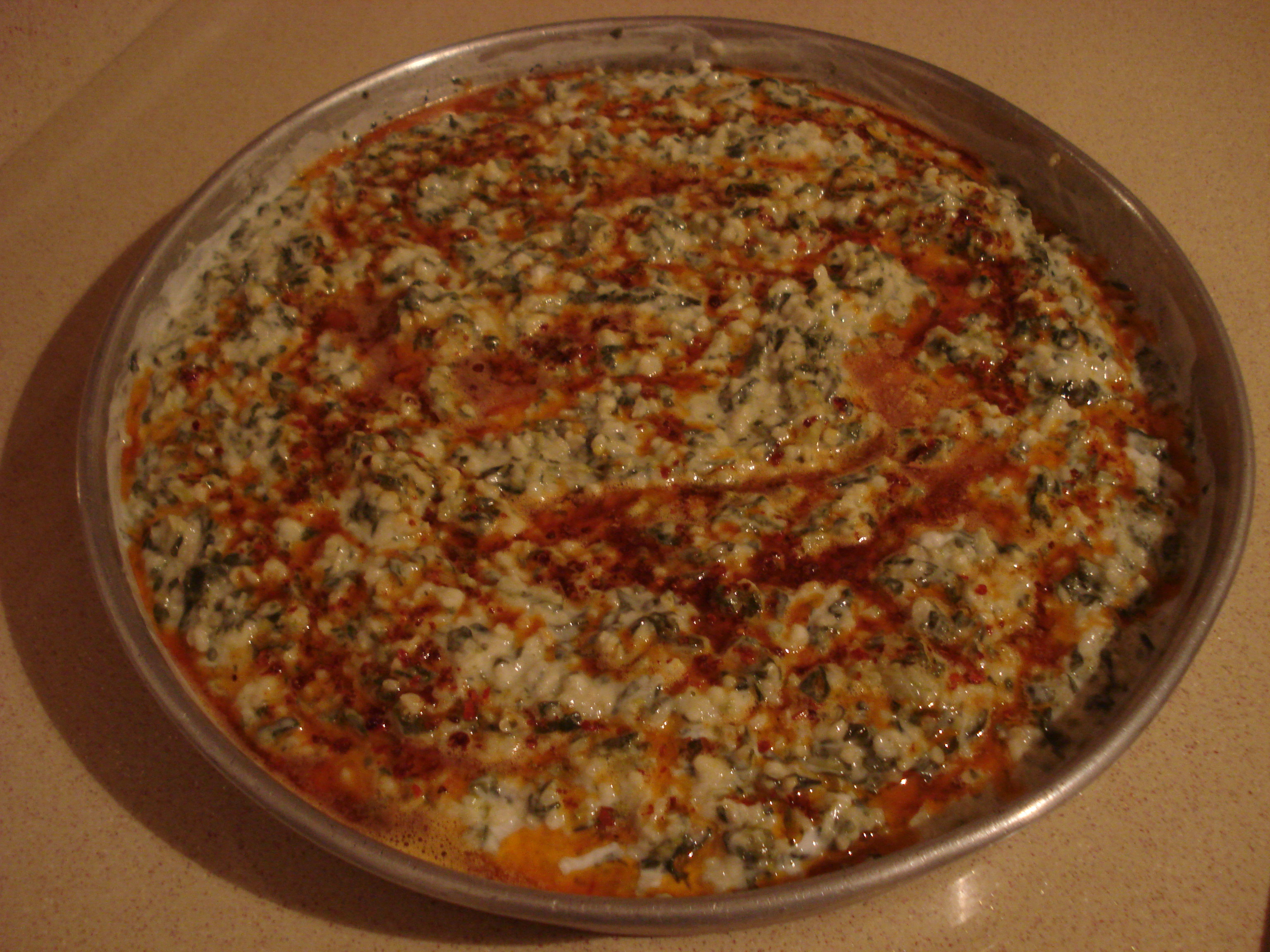
Turkish borani with spinach

Borani (Persian: بورانی, romanized: bowrâni) is a salad dish from Iranian cuisine. It is also found in Turkish cuisine where it is associated with certain provinces like Isparta, Urfa and Van. Some versions are made with spinach and yogurt, while the Ancient Persian borani was made with eggplant, and a regional version from Urfa is made with lamb and vegetarian meatballs. Borani is also popular in the Caucasus and Afghanistan.

== Terminology ==
Borani was the name of an eggplant dish in Ancient Persian cuisine. In the cuisine of Urfa province borani is a lamb and bulgur kofta dish made with chard and chickpeas, sometimes called "Urfa borani". There is also a form of the dish made with spinach and yogurt, and other versions made with different ingredients combined with yogurt. In southern Albania the term describes a baked egg and spinach dish. In Gaziantep there is version without any yogurt, called borani, and made with black-eyed peas and ground lamb.

A legend has it that Borani recipes are attributed to their namesake, the Sasanian queen Pourandokht. Queen Pourandokht was fond of yogurt, so her chef made her many dishes with drained yogurt and vegetables. These dishes were called Pourani after her, and in time Pourani came to be known as Borani.

In a study on the 'Foods and Breads of the Selçuk Period', Mehmet Zeki Oral defined borani as follows:

"Dishes in which the vegetables are boiled, then sautéed, are called borani. Herbs such as spinach, amaranth, dock, mallow and sorrel are simmered in water and then drained. They are then sautéed in oil/butter and topped with yoghurt flavored with garlic. These are called borani in Anatolia, while in Senirken, only the variety made with spinach is called borani. Borani also refers to dishes where vegetables are cooked with rice or bulgur and then topped with yoghurt."

Borani is present among the Aromanians of the Pindus region of Greece, made with locally gathered nettles into a soup thickened with flour. The soup is served during the Tyrnavos carnival, and it symbolises the start of spring and fertility.

== Variations ==
Borani-e Esfanaj is a cold Persian salad made with spinach and yogurt, and other types of borani salad dishes are found in Turkish cuisine and other Middle Eastern cuisines.

Borani-e Khiar is an Iranian salad with yogurt, cucumber and walnut. The spinach yogurt salad is known as Sabzi Boranee in Afghanistan. Borani-ye Bademjan is a Persian version made with eggplant, also with yogurt.

== In other countries ==
In northern India, it is called Raita and in the south, it is called Pechadi.In Spain, its Persian name is Alborania, which is also used in Latin America.

== See also ==
- Tzatziki
