= Beuren =

Beuren may refer to:

- Beuren, Esslingen, a municipality in the district of Esslingen, Baden-Württemberg, Germany
- Beuren, Cochem-Zell, a municipality in the district Cochem-Zell, Rhineland-Palatinate, Germany
- Beuren, Trier-Saarburg, a municipality in the district Trier-Saarburg, Rhineland-Palatinate, Germany

== See also ==
- Van Beuren (surname)
