= Daqin =

Chinese term for the Roman Empire

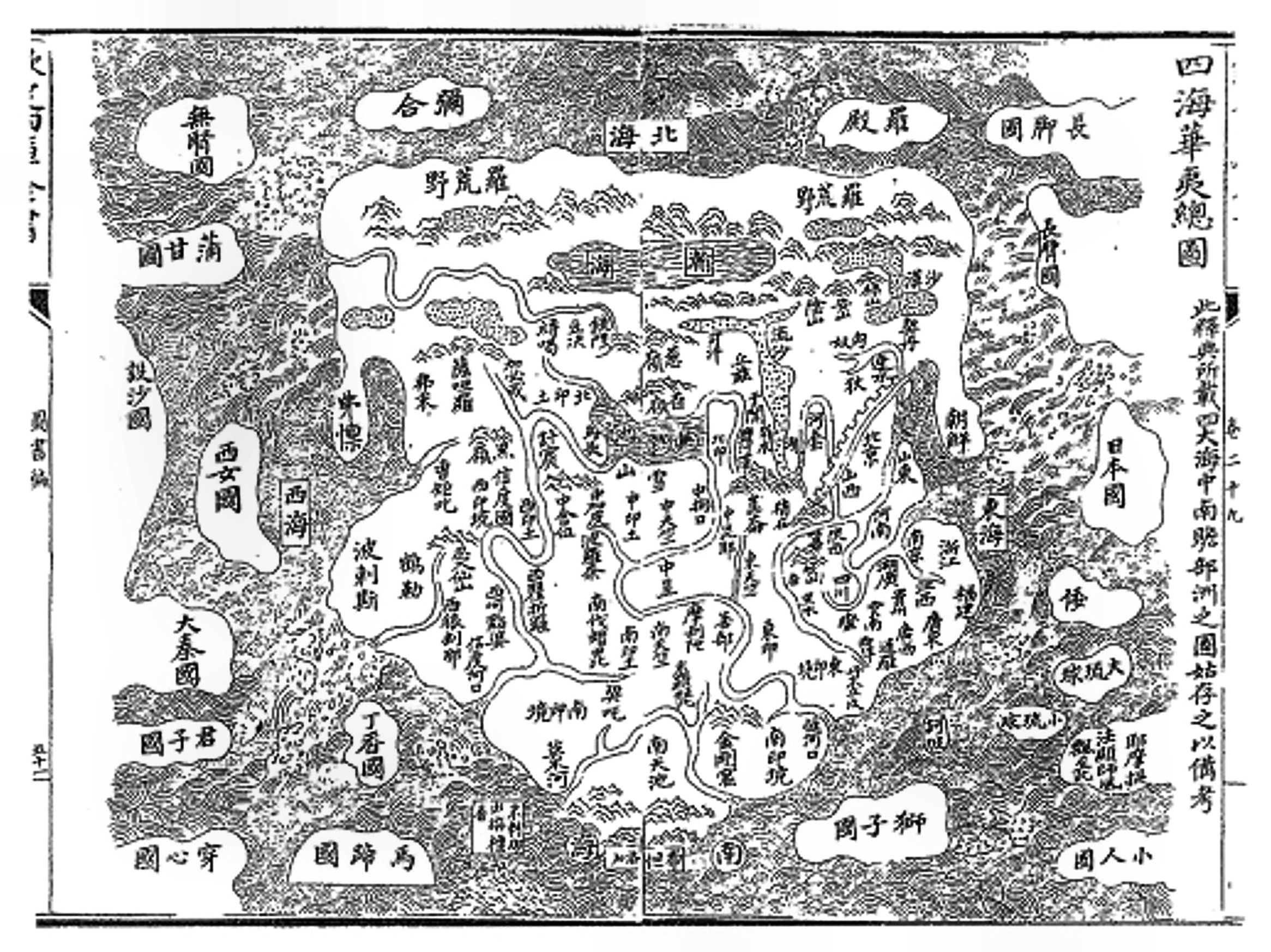
Daqin Guo (大秦國) appears at the Western edge, third from the bottom, of this Chinese world map, the Sihai Huayi Zongtu.

Daqin (Chinese: 大秦; pinyin: Dàqín; Wade–Giles: Ta^{4}-ch'in^{2}; alternative transliterations include Tachin, Tai-Ch'in) is the ancient Chinese name for the Roman Empire or, depending on context, the Near East, especially Syria. It literally means "Great Qin", Qin (Chinese: 秦; pinyin: Qín; Wade–Giles: Ch'in^{2}) being the name of the founding dynasty of the Chinese Empire. Historian John Foster defined it as "the Roman Empire, or rather that part of it which alone was known to the Chinese, Syria". Its basic facets such as laws, customs, dress, and currency were explained in Chinese sources. Its medieval incarnation was described in histories during the Tang dynasty (618–907 AD) onwards as Fulin (Chinese: 拂菻; pinyin: Fúlǐn), which Friedrich Hirth and other scholars have identified as the Byzantine Empire. Daqin was also commonly associated with the Syriac-speaking Nestorian Christians who lived in China during the Tang dynasty.

Chinese sources describe several ancient Roman embassies arriving in China, beginning in 166 AD and lasting into the 3rd century. These early embassies were said to arrive by a maritime route via the South China Sea in the Chinese province of Jiaozhi (now northern Vietnam). Archaeological evidence such as Roman coins points to the presence of Roman commercial activity in Southeast Asia. Later recorded embassies arriving from the Byzantine Empire, lasting from the 7th to 11th centuries, ostensibly took an overland route following the Silk Road, alongside other Europeans in Medieval China. Byzantine Greeks are recorded as being present in the court of Kublai Khan (1260–1294), the Mongol ruler of the Yuan dynasty in Khanbaliq (Beijing), while the Hongwu Emperor (r. 1368–1398), founder of the Ming dynasty, sent a letter of correspondence to Byzantine emperor John V Palaiologos.

== Etymology ==
=== Daqin ===
The term Daqin (Chinese: 大秦; pinyin: Dà qín; Wade–Giles: Ta^{4}-ch'in^{2}, Middle Chinese: /dɑi^{H} d͡ziɪn/), meaning "Great Qin", is derived from the dynasty founded by Qin Shi Huang, ruler of the State of Qin and China's first emperor who unified China's Warring States by 221 BC. The prefix da (大) or "great" signified that the Roman Empire was on par with the might of the Qin dynasty and was viewed as a utopian land located to the northwest of the Parthian Empire. The title Daqin does not seem to have any phonetic derivation from Latin Roma or Greek Romaikē.

=== Fulin ===
The term Daqin was used from the Han dynasty (202 BC – 220 AD) onwards, but by the beginning of the Tang dynasty (618–907 AD) a new name emerged in Chinese historical records for distinguishing the Eastern Roman Empire: Fulin (Chinese: 拂菻; pinyin: Fú lǐn). Friedrich Hirth surmised that Fulin may have been based on the accusative form of Konstantinoupolis, the Greek name of Constantinople, or rather its paraphrase hē Pólis ("the City"), giving (in the accusative) (tḕn) Pólin. Using historical phonetic pronunciations of Cantonese and Japanese, Hirth also speculated that Fulin in Middle Chinese was pronounced Butlim or Butlam and thus might have also come from the Syriac pronunciation for Bethlehem. While some scholars of the 20th century believed that Fulin was a transliteration of Ephraim, a reference to the Biblical Northern Kingdom, Samuel N. C. Lieu highlights how more recent scholarship has deduced that Fulin is most likely derived from the Persianate word for the Roman Empire shared by several contemporaneous Iranian languages (Middle Persian: hrwm; Parthian: frwm; Sogdian: βr'wm-; Bactrian: φρομο).

== History ==
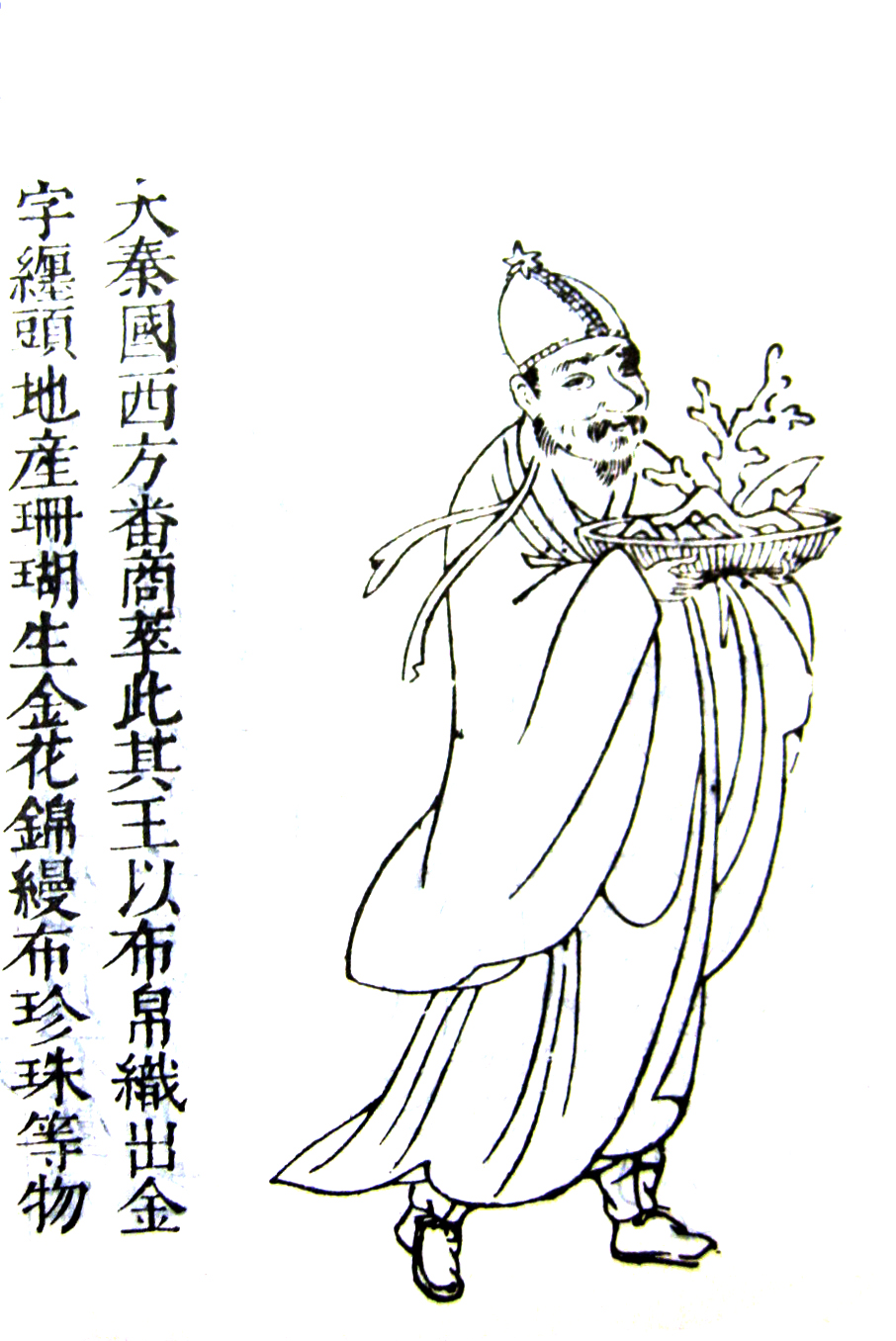
The Chinese impression of the Daqin people, from the Ming encyclopedia Sancai Tuhui. The caption reads: "Daqin: The western merchants end their journeys here. Its king wears embroidered tissues sewn with gold threads on his head. The land produces corals, grows golden flowers, coarse fabrics, pearls, etc."

=== Early descriptions by Gan Ying ===
Following the opening of the Silk Road in the 2nd century BC, the Chinese thought of the Roman Empire as a civilized counterpart to the Chinese Empire. The Romans occupied one extreme position on the trade route, with the Chinese located on the other.

China never managed to reach the Roman Empire directly in antiquity, although general Ban Chao sent Gan Ying as an envoy to "Daqin" in 97 AD. Gan Ying did not reach Daqin: he stopped at the coast of a large sea, because "sailor(s) of the Parthian west border" told him that the voyage to cross the sea might take a long time and be dangerous. Gan Ying left a detailed account of the Roman Empire, but it is generally considered to have been based on second-hand information from Parthians:

「大秦國一名犂鞬，以在海西，亦云海西國。地方數千里，有四百餘城。小國役屬者數十。以石為城郭。列置郵亭，皆堊塈之。有松柏諸木百草。」 The Kingdom of Da Qin (the Roman Empire) is also called Lijian. As it is found to the west of the sea, it is also called the Kingdom of Haixi ("West of the Sea"). The territory extends for several thousands of li. It has more than four hundred walled towns. There are several tens of smaller dependent kingdoms. The walls of the towns are made of stone. They have established postal relays at intervals, which are all plastered and whitewashed. There are pines and cypresses, as well as trees and plants of all kinds.

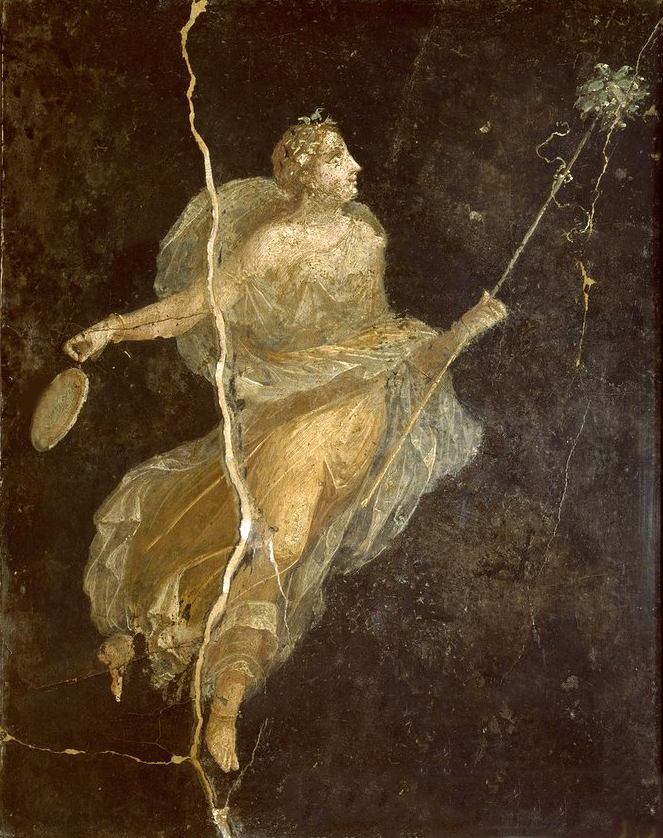
Roman fresco from Pompeii showing a Maenad in silk dress, Naples National Archaeological Museum

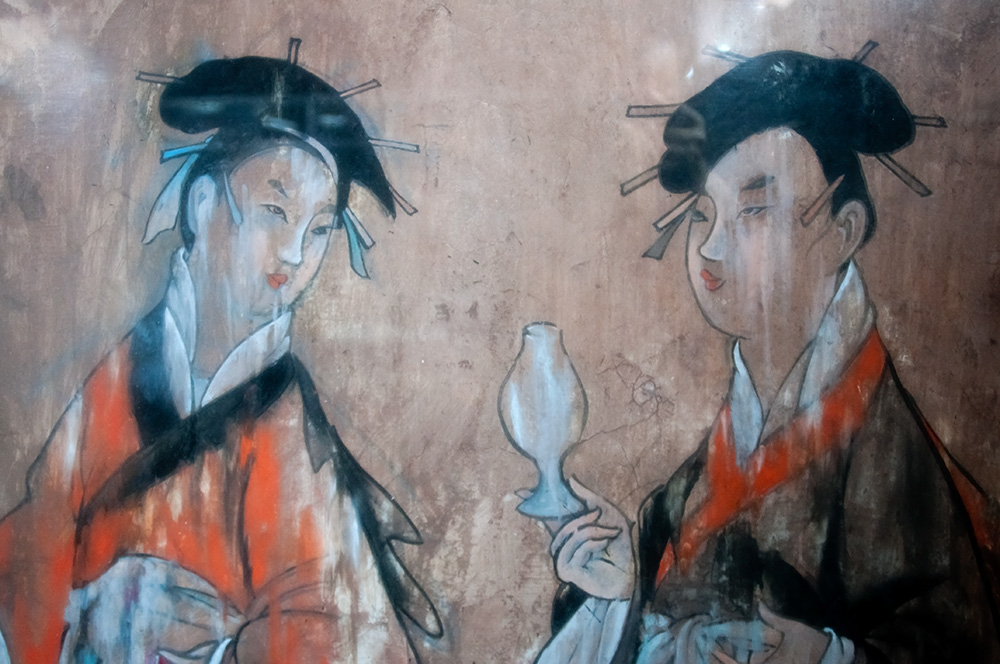
Detail of a mural showing two women wearing hanfu silk robes, from the Dahuting Tomb of the late Eastern Han dynasty (25–220 AD), located in Zhengzhou, Henan, China

Gan Ying gives a very idealistic view of Roman governance which is likely the result of some story he was told while visiting the Persian Gulf in 97 AD. He also described, less fancifully, Roman products:

「其王無有常人，皆簡立賢者。國中災異及風雨不時，輒廢而更立，受放者甘黜不怨。其人民皆長大平正，有類中國，故謂之大秦......土多金銀奇寶，有夜光璧、明月珠、駭雞犀、珊瑚、虎魄、琉璃、琅玕、朱丹、青碧。刺金縷繡，織成金縷罽、雜色綾。作黃金塗、火浣布。」

Their kings are not permanent. They select and appoint the most worthy man. If there are unexpected calamities in the kingdom, such as frequent extraordinary winds or rains, he is unceremoniously rejected and replaced. The one who has been dismissed quietly accepts his demotion, and is not angry. The people of this country are all tall and honest. They resemble the people of the Middle Kingdom and that is why this kingdom is called Da Qin. This country produces plenty of gold [and] silver, [and of] rare and precious they have luminous jade, "bright moon pearls", Haiji rhinoceroses, coral, yellow amber, opaque glass, whitish chalcedony [i.e., langgan], red cinnabar, green gemstones, gold-thread embroideries, woven gold-threaded net, delicate polychrome silks painted with gold, and asbestos cloth.

「又有細布，或言水羊毳，野蠶繭所作也。合會諸香，煎其汁以為蘇合。凡外國諸珍異皆出焉。以金銀為錢，銀錢十當金錢一。與安息、天竺交巿於海中，利有十倍。[...]其王常欲通使於漢，而安息欲以漢繒綵與之交市，故遮閡不得自達。」

They also have a fine cloth which some people say is made from the down of "water sheep", but which is made, in fact, from the cocoons of wild silkworms. They blend all sorts of fragrances, and by boiling the juice, make a compound perfume. [They have] all the precious and rare things that come from the various foreign kingdoms. They make gold and silver coins. Ten silver coins are worth one gold coin. They trade with Anxi and Tianzhu by sea. The profit margin is ten to one. ... The king of this country always wanted to send envoys to the Han, but Anxi, wishing to control the trade in multi-coloured Chinese silks, blocked the route to prevent [the Romans] getting through [to China].

=== Geographical descriptions in the Weilüe ===
In the Weilüe written by Yu Huan (c. 239–265), a text that is preserved in the Records of the Three Kingdoms by Pei Songzhi (published in 429), a more detailed description of the Eastern portion of the Roman Empire is given, particularly the province of Roman Egypt. The 19th-century sinologist Friedrich Hirth translated the passages and identified the places named in them, which have been edited by Jerome S. Arkenberg in 2000 (with Wade-Giles spelling):

Formerly T'iao-chih was wrongly believed to be in the west of Ta-ts'in; now its real position is known to be east. [...] Formerly it was, further, wrongly believed that the Jo-shui was in the west of T'iao-chih; now the Jo-shui is believed to be in the west of Ta-ts'in. Formerly it was wrongly believed that, going over two hundred days west of T'iao-chih, one came near the place where the sun sets; now, one comes near the place where the sun sets by going west of Ta-ts'in. The country of Ta-ts'in, also called Li-kan, is on the west of the great sea [the Indian Ocean] west of Ar-hsi and T'iao-chih. From the city of Ar-ku, on the boundary of Ar-hsi one takes passage in a ship and, traversing the west of the sea, with favorable winds arrives [at Aelana, modern Elat, on the Gulf of Aqaba] in two months; with slow winds, the passage may last a year, and with no wind at all, perhaps three years. This country is on the west of the sea whence it is commonly called Hai-hsi. There is a river [the Nile] coming out from the west of this country, and there is another great sea [the Mediterranean]. In the west of the sea there is the city of Ali-san. Before one arrives in the country one goes straight north from the city of U-tan. In the south-west one further travels by a river which on board ship one crosses in one day [again the Nile]; and again south-west one travels by a river which is crossed in one day [still the Nile]. There are three great divisions of the country [i. e., Delta, Heptanomis, Thebaid]. From the city of Ar-ku one goes by land due north to the north of the sea; and again one goes due west to the west of the sea; and again you go due south to arrive there. At the city of Ali-san, you travel by river on board ship one day, then make a round at sea, and after six days' passage on the great sea [the Mediterranean], arrive in this country. There are in the country in all over four hundred smaller cities; its size is several thousand li in all directions of the compass. The residence of their king lies on the banks of a river estuary [Antioch-on-the-Orontes]. They use stone in making city walls. In this country there are the trees sung [pine], po [cypress], huai [sophora?], tzu [a kind of euphorbia?]; bamboos, rushes, poplars, willows, the wu-t'ung tree, and all kinds of other plants. The people are given to planting on the fields all kinds of grain. Their domestic animals are: the horse, the donkey, the mule, the camel, and the mulberry silk-worm. There are many jugglers who can issue fire from their mouths, bind and release themselves, and dance on twenty balls. In this country they have no permanent rulers, but when an extraordinary calamity visits the country, they elect as king a worthier man, while discharging the old king, who does not even dare to feel angry at this decision. The people are tall, and upright in their dealings, like the Han [Chinese], but wear foreign dress; they call their country another "Middle Kingdom" [probably from "Mediterranean" or "Middle of the Land"].

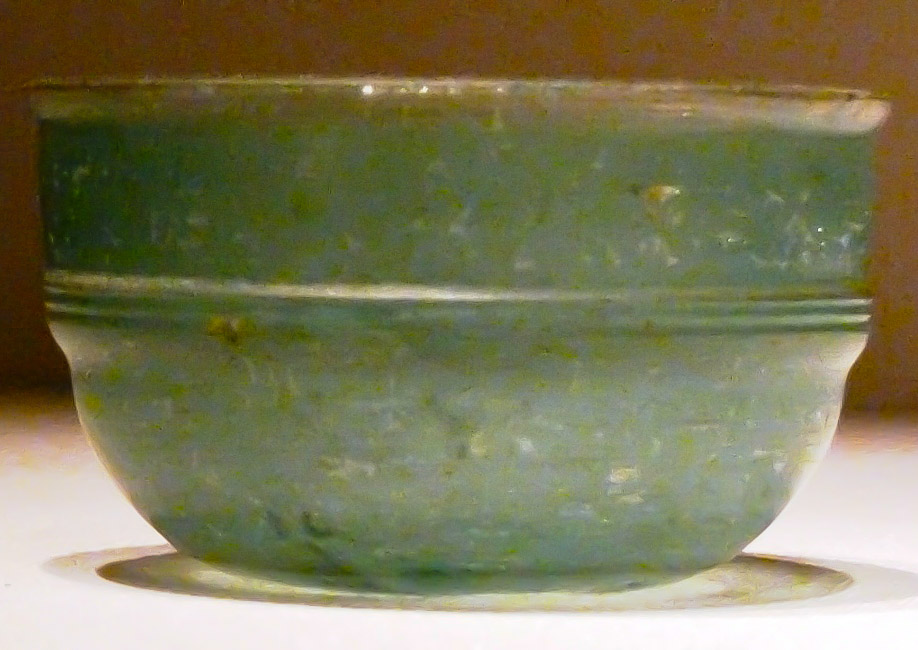
Green Roman glass cup unearthed from an Eastern Han dynasty (25–220 AD) tomb, Guangxi, China

The Weilüe also noted that the Daqin had small "dependent" vassal states, too many to list as the text claims, yet it mentions some as being the Alexandria-Euphrates or Charax Spasinu ("Ala-san"), Nikephorium ("Lu-fen"), Palmyra ("Ch'ieh-lan"), Damascus ("Hsien-tu"), Emesa ("Si-fu"), and Hira ("Ho-lat"). Perhaps some of these are in reference to certain states that were temporarily conquered during the Roman–Parthian Wars (66 BC – 217 AD) when, for instance, the army of Roman Emperor Trajan reached the Persian Gulf and captured Characene, the capital of which was Charax Spasinu. The Weilüe provides the traveling directions and approximate distances between each of these cities, counted in ancient Chinese miles (li), and along with the Book of Later Han even mentions the pontoon bridge ("flying bridge") across the Euphrates at the Roman city of Zeugma, Commagene (in modern-day Turkey).

Hirth and Arkenberg identified Si-fu (Chinese: 汜復) with Emesa. However, John E. Hill provides evidence that it was most likely Petra (in the Nabataean Kingdom), given the directions and distance from "Yuluo" (i.e. Al Karak) and the fact that it fell under Roman dominion in 106 AD when it was annexed by Trajan. Even more convincing for Hill is the fact that Si-fu in Chinese means "an arm of a river which rejoins the main stream" or more aptly "rejoined water courses". He believes this is directly related to the reservoir and cistern flood-control system harnessing the many streams running through the settlement and nearby canyons, or wadis, such as the Wadi Musa ("Valley of Moses").

=== Christianity ===
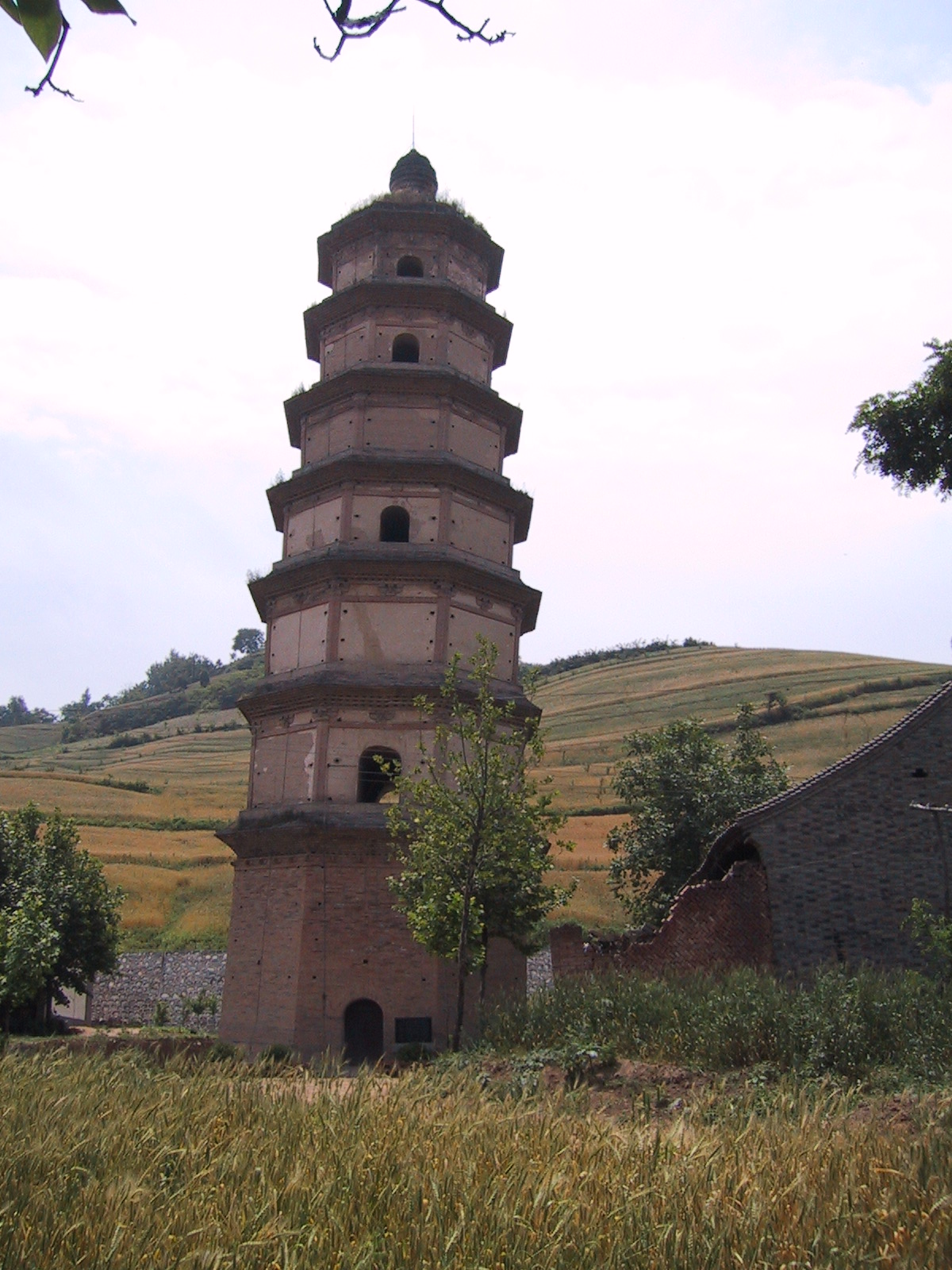
The Daqin Pagoda, which allegedly once formed part of a Nestorian church

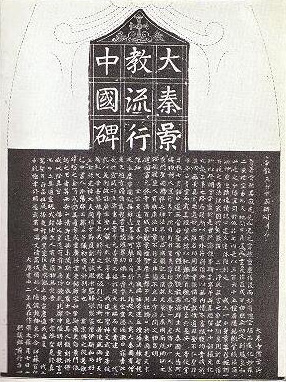
The Nestorian Stele entitled "Stele to the propagation in China of the luminous religion of Daqin" (大秦景教流行中國碑), was erected in China in 781.

In later eras, starting in AD 550, as Syriac Christians settled along the Silk Road and founded mission churches, Daqin or Tai-Ch'in is also used to refer to these Christian populations rather than to Rome or the Roman church. So, for example, when the Taoist Emperor Wuzong of Tang closed Christian monasteries in the mid-9th century, the imperial edict commanded:

As for the Tai-Ch'in (Syrian Christian) and Muh-hu (Zoroastrian) forms of worship, since Buddhism has already been cast out, these heresies alone must not be allowed to survive.

The name "Daqin" for Rome was used on Chinese maps as late as the 16th century, such as the Sihai Huayi Zongtu. The identification of "Daqin" with the Western Roman Empire, Eastern Roman Empire, or the Church of the East varies with the era and context of the document. The Nestorian Stele erected in 781 in the Tang capital Chang'an contains an inscription that briefly summarizes the knowledge about Daqin in the Chinese histories written up to that point and notes how only the "luminous" religion (i.e. Christianity) was practiced there.

=== Capital cities ===
In the Hou Hanshu and the Weilüe, the chief city of Daqin is said to be more than 100 li around. It is described as being located near a river and having five palaces, with the king travelling to one of these palaces each day. Some scholars have identified in this description the city of Rome, the Tiber River and the Imperial residences of the Palatine Hill. However, other scholars, including Hirth and Hoppál, identify it with Antioch. It has also been suggested that the capital of Daqin described in those works is a conflation of multiple cities, chiefly Rome, Antioch and Alexandria.

In Gan Ying's report the capital of Daqin is "An-tu", Antioch. However, the Old Book of Tang and New Book of Tang, which identified Daqin and "Fulin" (拂菻; i.e. Primus, the Byzantine Empire) as the same countries, noted a different capital city (Constantinople), one that had walls of "enormous height" and was eventually besieged by the commander "Móyì" (Chinese: 摩拽伐之; Pinyin: Móyì fá zhī) of the Da shi (大食; i.e. the Arabs). Friedrich Hirth identifies this commander as Mu'awiyah I, who was first governor of Syria before becoming caliph and founder of the Umayyad Caliphate.

=== Characteristics attributed from the Book of Jin to the Romans ===
The encyclopedic part of the Book of Jin classified the appearance of the Romans as being genuinely Xirong, a barbaric people who lived west of the Zhou dynasty, however, the characteristics attributed to Daqin tend to be more positive than the others, saying that their people when they reached adulthood looked like the Chinese, they used glass on the walls of their houses (considered a luxury item in the Tang dynasty), their tiles were covered with coral, their "king" had 5 palaces, all huge, and all far from each other, just as what was heard in one palace took time to reach another and so on.

=== Embassies ===
Starting in the 1st century BC with Virgil, Horace, and Strabo, Roman histories offer only vague accounts of China and the silk-producing Seres of the distant east. The 2nd-century historian Florus seems to have conflated the Seres with peoples of India, or at least noted that their skin complexions proved that they both lived "beneath another sky" than the Romans. The 1st-century geographer Pomponius Mela noted that their lands formed the center of the coast of an eastern ocean, flanked by India to the south and the Scythians of the northern steppe, while the historian Ammianus Marcellinus (c. 330 – c. 400) wrote that the land of the Seres was enclosed by great natural walls around a river called Bautis, perhaps the Yellow River. In his Geography, Ptolemy also provided a rough sketch of the Gulf of Thailand and South China Sea, with a port city called Cattigara lying beyond the Golden Chersonese (i.e. Malay Peninsula) visited by a Greek sailor named Alexander. Among the proposed sites for Ptolemy's Cattigara are Oc Eo, Vietnam, where Roman artefacts have been found.

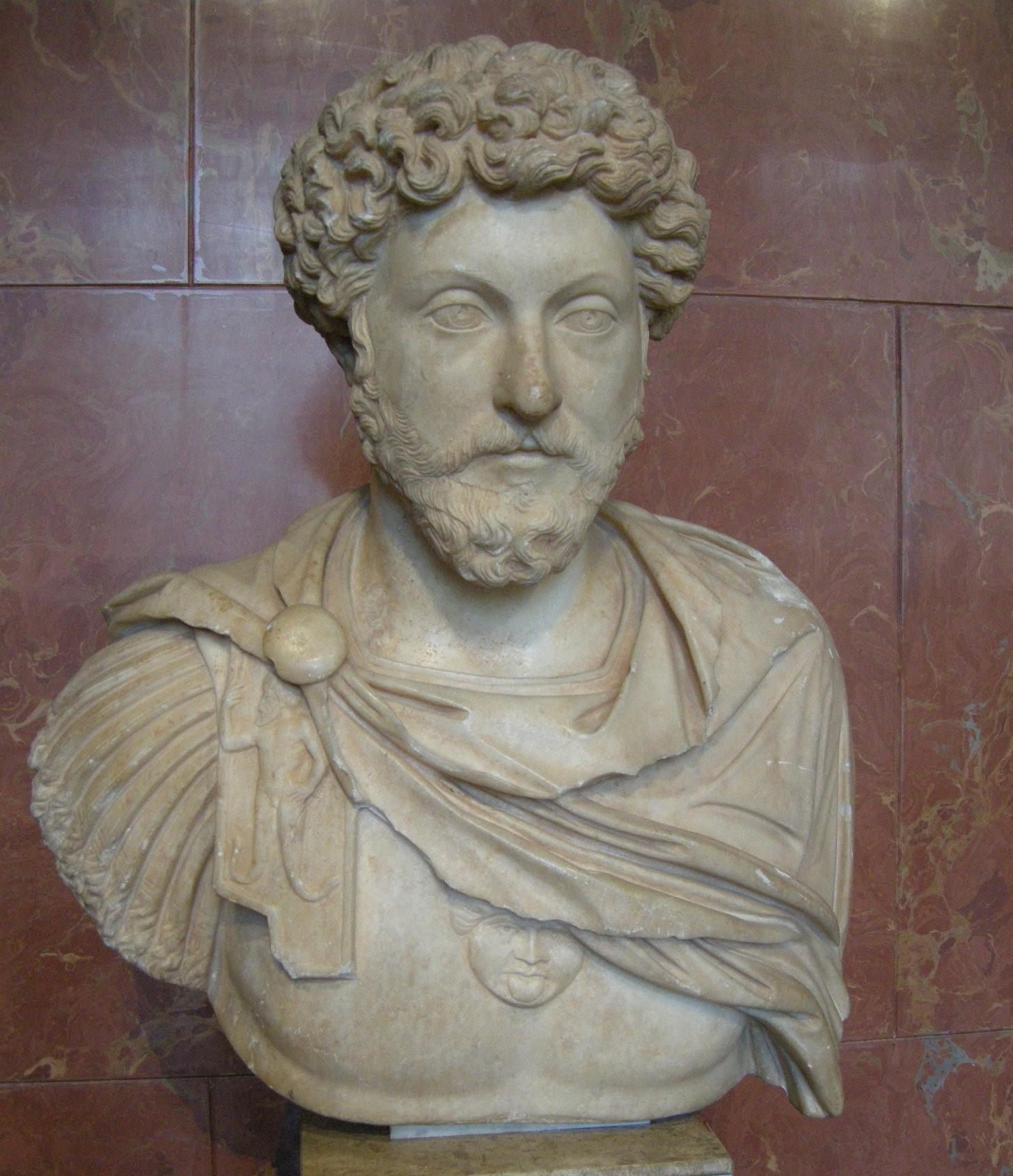
Bust of Marcus Aurelius from Probalinthos, Attica (c. 161 AD; now in the Louvre, Paris)

In contrast, Chinese histories offer an abundance of source material about their interactions with alleged Roman embassies and descriptions of their country. The first of these embassies is recorded in the Book of Later Han as having arrived by sea in 166 AD and came by way of Jiaozhou, later known as Annam (northern Vietnam), as would later embassies. Its members claimed to be representatives of the Daqin ruler "Andun" (安敦), either Antoninus Pius or more likely his co-emperor Marcus Aurelius Antoninus, and offered gifts to the court of Emperor Huan of Han. Other embassies arrived sporadically afterwards. The Book of Liang mentions a Daqin embassy to Sun Quan of Eastern Wu in 226, while the Book of Jin records a Daqin embassy to Emperor Wu of Jin in 284.

Although Emperor Yang of Sui (r. 604–618) had desired to send an embassy to Daqin, this never came to fruition. Instead, an embassy from a country that was now called Fulin (拂菻, i.e. the Byzantine Empire), which the Old Book of Tang and New Book of Tang identified as being the same as Daqin, arrived in 643 at the court of Emperor Taizong of Tang and claimed to represent their king Bo duoli (波多力; i.e. Kōnstantinos Pogonatos, "Constantine the Bearded", the nickname of Constans II). Several other Fulin (i.e. Byzantium) embassies during the Tang dynasty are mentioned for the years 667, 701, and 719.

The Wenxian Tongkao written by Ma Duanlin (1245–1322) and the History of Song record that the Byzantine emperor Michael VII Parapinakēs Caesar (Mie li sha ling kai sa 滅力沙靈改撒) of Fulin (i.e. Byzantium) sent an embassy to China that arrived in 1081, during the reign of Emperor Shenzong of Song (r. 1067–1085). During the subsequent Yuan dynasty (1271–1368), an unprecedented number of Europeans started to visit and live in China, such as Marco Polo and Caterina Vilioni, and papal missionaries such as John of Montecorvino and Giovanni de Marignolli. The History of Yuan recounts how a man of Fulin named Ai-sie (transliteration of either Joshua or Joseph), initially in the service of Güyük Khan, was well-versed in Western languages and had expertise in the fields of medicine and astronomy. This convinced Kublai Khan, founder of the Yuan dynasty, to offer him a position as the director of medical and astronomical boards, eventually honoring him with the title of Prince of Fulin (Chinese: 拂菻王; Fú lǐn wáng). His biography in the History of Yuan lists his children by their Chinese names, which are similar to the Christian names Elias (Ye-li-ah), Luke (Lu-ko), and Antony (An-tun), with a daughter named A-na-si-sz.

The History of Ming explains how the founder of the Ming dynasty (1368–1644), the Hongwu Emperor, sent a merchant of Fulin named "Nieh-ku-lun" (捏古倫) back to his home country with a letter announcing the founding of a new dynasty. It is speculated that this "merchant" was actually a former bishop of Khanbaliq named Nicolaus de Bentra. The History of Ming goes on to explain that contacts between China and Fulin ceased thereafter, whereas an envoy of the great western sea (i.e. the Mediterranean Sea) did not arrive again until the 16th century, with the Italian Jesuit missionary Matteo Ricci.

== Currency and coinage ==
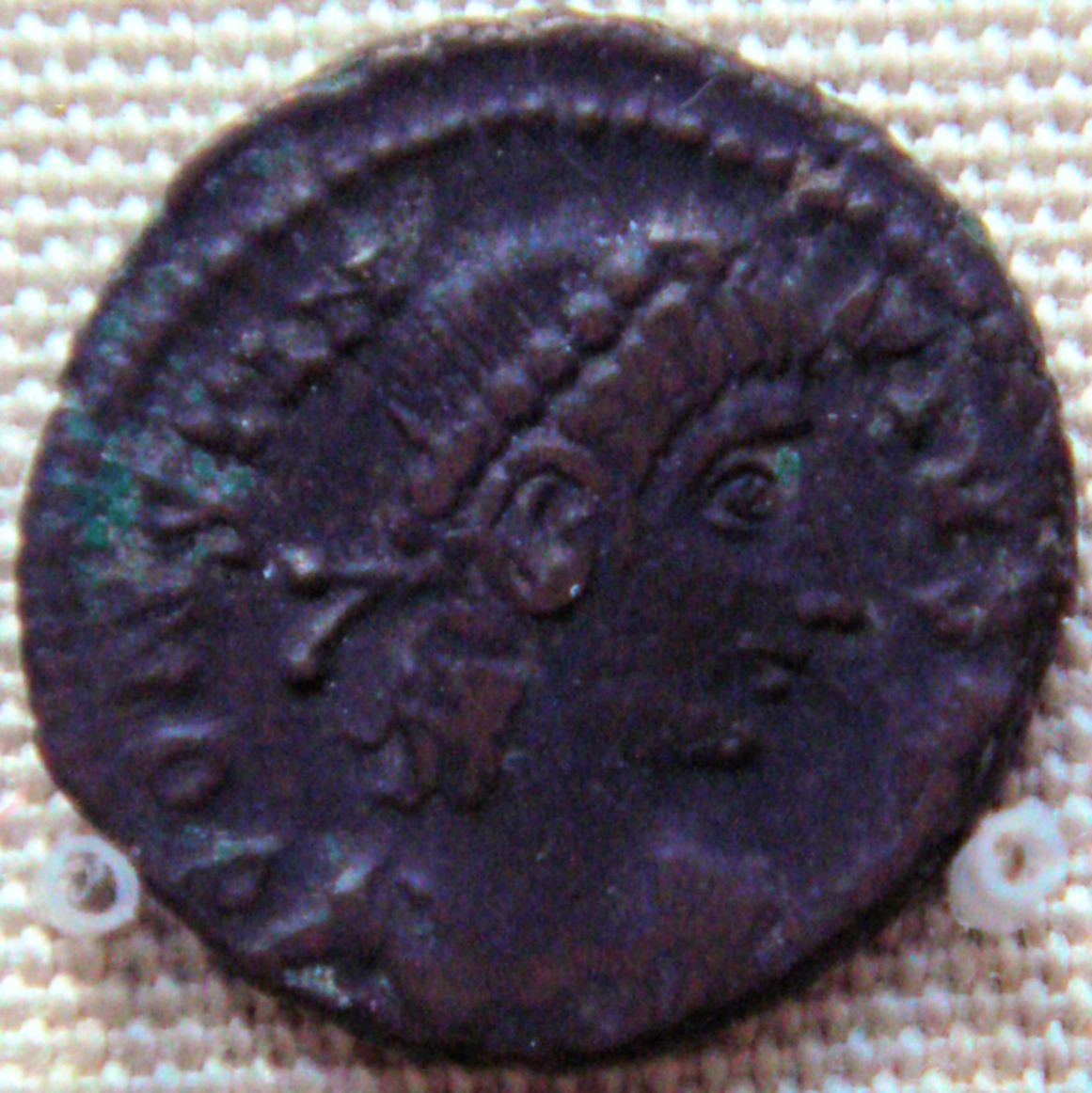
Bronze coin of Constantius II (337–361), found in Karghalik, modern China

Although the ancient Romans imported Han Chinese silk while the Han-dynasty Chinese imported Roman glasswares as discovered in their tombs, Valerie Hansen (2012) claimed that no Roman coins from the Roman Republic (507–27 BC) or the Principate (27 BC–284 AD) era of the Roman Empire have been found in China. Yet this assumption has been overturned; Warwick Ball (2016) notes the discovery of sixteen Roman coins found at Xi'an, China (site of the Han capital Chang'an) minted during the reign of various emperors from Tiberius (14–37 AD) to Aurelian (270–275 AD). The earliest gold solidus coins from the Eastern Roman Empire found in China date to the reign of Byzantine emperor Theodosius II (r. 408–450) and altogether only forty-eight of them have been found (compared to thirteen hundred silver coins) in Xinjiang and the rest of China. However, Roman golden medallions from the reign of Antoninus Pius, and possibly his successor Marcus Aurelius, have been discovered at Óc Eo in southern Vietnam, which was then part of the Kingdom of Funan bordering the Chinese province of Jiaozhi in northern Vietnam. This was the same region where Chinese historical texts claim the Romans first landed before venturing further into China to conduct diplomacy.

Chinese histories offer descriptions of Byzantine coins. In discussing trade with India, the Parthian Empire and the Roman Empire, the Book of Jin, as well as the later Wenxian Tongkao, noted how ten ancient Roman silver coins were worth one Roman gold coin. With fluctuations, the Roman golden aureus was worth about twenty-five silver denarii. The History of Song notes how the Byzantines made coins of either silver or gold, without holes in the middle yet with an inscription of the king's name.

== Law and order ==
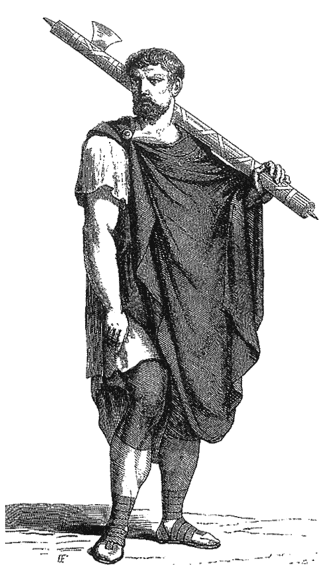
An 1860 sketch depicting a Roman lictor, a bodyguard for Roman magistrates

The History of Song described forms of punishment in criminal law as they were carried out in Daqin (Roman Empire) and Fulin (Byzantine Empire). It states that they made a distinction between minor and major offenses, with 200 strikes from a bamboo rod being reserved for major crimes. It described their form of capital punishment as having the guilty person being stuffed into a "feather bag" and thrown into the sea. This seems to correspond with the Romano-Byzantine punishment of poena cullei (from Latin "punishment of the sack"), where those who committed parricide (i.e. murder of a father or mother) were sewn into a sack, sometimes with wild animals, and thrown into either a river or sea. The History of Song also mentioned how it was forbidden by law to counterfeit the coins minted by Fulin. These descriptions from the History of Song are also found in the Wenxian Tongkao.

== Naming conventions ==
In the Chinese histories, the names of Romans and Byzantines were often transliterated into Chinese as they were heard, yet occasionally the surname stemmed from their country of origin, Daqin (大秦). For instance, the Roman merchant Qin Lun (秦論), who visited the Eastern Wu court of Sun Quan in 226 AD, bears the surname derived from the name for his homeland, while having a given name that is perhaps derived from the Greek name Leon (e.g. Leon of Sparta). In the Han-era stage of the spoken language intermediate between Old Chinese and Middle Chinese, the pronunciation for his given name "Lun" (論) would have sounded quite different from modern spoken Mandarin: K. 470b *li̯wən / li̯uĕn or *lwən / luən; EMC lwən or lwənh.

Granting Roman individuals the surname "Qin" followed a common Chinese naming convention for foreign peoples. For instance, people from the Parthian Empire of ancient Persia such as An Shigao were often given the surname "An" (安) derived from Anxi (安息), the Arsacid dynasty. The Sogdians, an Eastern Iranian people from Central Asia, were also frequently given the surname "An" (e.g. An Chongzhang), especially those from Bukhara, while Sogdians from Samarkand were surnamed "Kang" (康; e.g. Kang Senghui), derived from Kangju, the Chinese term for Transoxiana. The name given for either Antoninus Pius or Marcus Aurelius Antoninus in the Chinese histories was "An Dun" (安敦). (Note: The surname "An" (安) used here for the surname of Marcus Aurelius Antoninus is the same as the aforementioned surname used for Parthians and Sogdians.)

== See also ==
- Christianity in China
- Church of the East in China
- Daqin Pagoda
- Europeans in Medieval China
- Foreign relations of imperial China
- Michael Shen Fu-Tsung, Chinese visitor to Europe in the 17th century
- Nestorian Stele (Memorial of the Propagation in China of the Luminous Religion from Daqin)
- History of the Han dynasty
- Seres and Serica, Latin Roman words for Chinese and China, respectively; see also Sinae
- Sino-Roman relations
- Zhang Qian, Western-Han Chinese explorer of Central Asia during the 2nd century BC
