= Weilüe =

3rd-century Chinese historical text by Yu Huan

Weilüe 'A Brief History of Wei'
- Chinese: 魏略
Transcriptions
Standard Mandarin
- Hanyu Pinyin: Wèi lüè
- IPA: [wêɪ lɥê]
Hakka
- Romanization: Ngui liok
Yue: Cantonese
- Yale Romanization: Ngaih leuhk
- Jyutping: Ngai^{6} loek^{6}
Southern Min
- Hokkien POJ: Guī lio̍h

The Weilüe (Chinese: 魏略; 'A Brief [History] of Wei') was a Chinese historical text written by Yu Huan between 239 and 265. Yu Huan was an official in the state of Cao Wei (220–265) during the Three Kingdoms period. Although not a formal historian, Yu Huan has been held in high regard among Chinese scholars. As per the texts, Roman (known to the Chinese as Daqin) travelers and traders of those times claimed that Roman elites were descendants of immigrants from ancient Chinese nobility and Parthian elites were descendants of ancient North Indian empires.

== Content ==
The original text of the Weilüe, or "Brief Account of Wei", by Yu Huan has been lost, but the chapter on the Xirong people was quoted by Pei Songzhi as an extensive footnote to volume 30 of the Annotated Records of the Three Kingdoms, which was first published in 429. Other than this chapter, only a few isolated quotes remain in other texts.

Yu Huan does not mention his sources in the text that has survived. Some of this new data presumably came to China via traders from the Roman Empire (Daqin). Land communications with the West apparently continued relatively uninterrupted to Cao Wei after the fall of the Eastern Han dynasty.

Yu Huan apparently never left China, but he collected a large amount of information on the countries to the west of China including Parthia, India, and the Roman Empire, and the various routes to them. Some of this information had reached China well before Yu Huan's time, and can also be found in the sections dealing with the 'Western Regions' of the Shiji and the Book of Han (Note: The Book of the Later Han was compiled in the early Liu Song dynasty, more than a century after Yu Huan's era.). In spite of this repetition of earlier (and sometimes fanciful) information, the Weilüe contains new, unique, and generally trustworthy material, mostly from the late second and early third centuries. It is this new information that makes the Weilüe a valuable historical source. Most of the new information appears to have come from the Eastern Han dynasty, before China was largely cut off from the West by civil wars and unrest along its borders during the late second century.

The Weilüe describes the routes to the Roman Empire and it is quite possible that some, or all, of the new information on the Roman Empire and Parthia came from foreign sailors. One such record which may have been available to Yu Huan is detailed in the Book of Liang of a merchant from the Roman Empire who in 226 arrived in Jiaozhi, near modern Hanoi, and was sent to the court of the Eastern Wu emperor Sun Quan, who asked him for a report on his native country and its people.

Yu Huan also includes a brief description of "Zesan", a vassal state of the Roman Empire. John E. Hill identified "Zesan" with Azania located at the East African coast. However, this is unlikely, since later sources like the New Book of Tang recorded that "Zesan" was located to the northeast of the Roman Empire.

Weilüe mentioned a kingdom named "Panyue" or "Hanyuewang", located to the southeast of India. Hill identified it with Pandya of Tamilakam and gave a translation: "The kingdom of Panyue (Pandya) is also called Hanyuewang. It is several thousand li to the southeast of Tianzhu (Northern India), and is in contact with Yi Circuit [in modern southern Yunnan]. The inhabitants are small; they are the same height as the Chinese. Traders from Shu (Western Sichuan) travel this far. The Southern Route, after attaining its most westernmost point, turns southeast until it reaches its end." He believed the phrase "與益部相近" meant "in contact with Yi Circuit". However it could be taken literally as "close to Yi Circuit", and the likely candidate for "Panyue" was Pundravardhana in Bengal.

== Translations ==
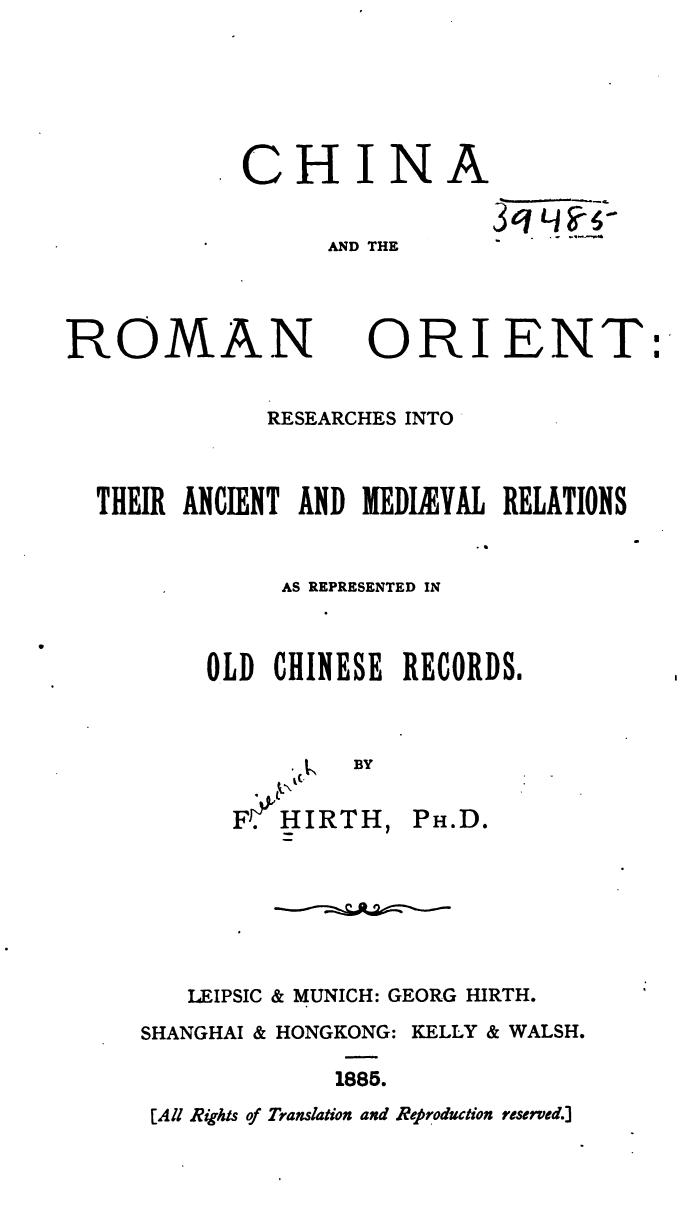
1885 English translation of the Weilüe, translated by Friedrich Hirth.

The section on Daqin (Roman territory) from the Weilüe was translated into English by Friedrich Hirth in his pioneering 1885 volume, China and the Roman Orient. Hirth included translations of a wide range of other Chinese texts relating to Daqin and the Chinese text of each is included. In 1905, Édouard Chavannes translated the remainder of the Weilüe into French under the title of "Les pays d'occident d'après le Wei lio". Chavannes' translation is accompanied by copious notes in which he clarified numerous obscurities, and convincingly identified many of the countries and towns mentioned in the Weilüe, especially along the eastern sections of the overland trade routes.
