= Sihai Huayi Zongtu =

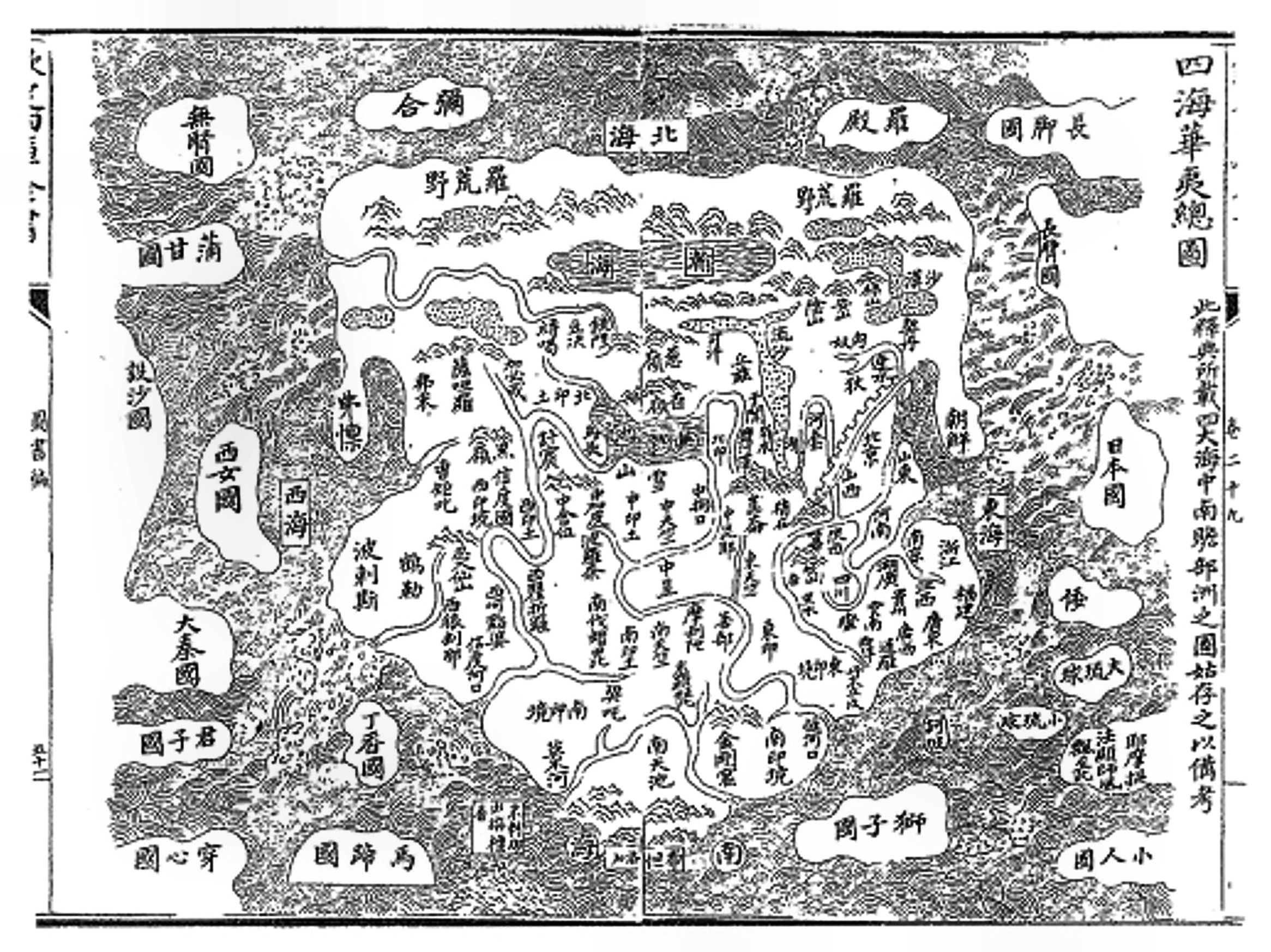
- The "Complete Map of the Four Seas, China, and Barbarians" (四海華夷總圖, 四海华夷总图, Sihai Huayi Zongtu)
- Traditional Chinese: 四海華夷總圖
- Simplified Chinese: 四海华夷总图
- Literal meaning: Complete Map of the Four Seas, China, and the Barbarians
Transcriptions
Standard Mandarin
- Hanyu Pinyin: Sìhǎi Huáyí Zǒngtú
- Wade–Giles: Szu⁴-hai³ Hua²-i² Tsung³-tʻu²

The Sihai Huayi Zongtu ("Complete Map of the Four Seas, China, and the Barbarians") is a Chinese world map dated to 1532, the 11th year of the Ming Dynasty's Jiajing Emperor. It is now located in the Harvard Library.

The map is oriented towards the north and displays various locations in China, as well as Korea, Siberia (as Luohuangye), Nepal and a vast India, Persia, on the central continent. Japan lies beyond the East China Sea, along with such imaginary locations as the "Land of the Pygmies". The Roman Empire appears (as Daqinguo) beyond the "Western Sea".

== See also ==
- History of Chinese cartography
- Cartography of China
