= Giovanni de' Marignolli =

Catholic European traveller to Asia (c.1338–1353)

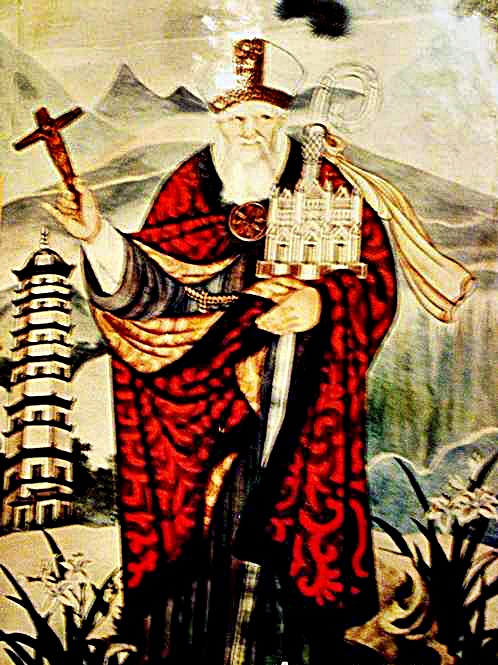
Giovanni Marignolli image

Giovanni de' Marignolli (Note: The name also appears as Giovanni Marignolli, dei Marignolli and da Marignolli.) (Latin: Johannes Marignola; (Note: The name also appears as Joannes de Marignolis de Florentia, de Marignoli, and Marignola Florentinus.) fl. 1338–1353), variously anglicized as John of Marignolli or John of Florence, (Note: The name also appears as John Marignolli, de Marignola, de Marignolli, and de' Marignolli.) was a notable 14th-century Catholic European traveller to medieval China and India.

== Life ==
=== Early life ===
Giovanni was born, probably before 1290, to the noble Florentine family of the Marignolli. The family is long extinct, but the Via de' Cerretani, a street near the cathedral, formerly bore their name. Giovanni received his habit at the Franciscan basilica of Santa Croce at a young age. His work claims he later held the chair of theology at the University of Bologna.

=== Departure ===
In 1338 there arrived at Avignon, where Pope Benedict XII held his court, an embassy from the great khan of Cathay (the Mongol emperor of the Chinese Yuan dynasty), bearing letters to the pontiff from the khan himself, and from certain Christian Alan nobles in his service. These latter represented that they had been eight years (since Monte Corvino's death) without a spiritual guide, and earnestly desired one. The pope replied to the letters and appointed four ecclesiastics as his legates to the khan's court. The name "John of Florence" appears third on the letters of commission. A large party was associated with the four chief envoys: when in Khanbaliq (within modern Beijing), the embassy still numbered thirty-two out of an original fifty. The mission left Avignon in December 1338; picked up the "Tatar" envoys at Naples on 10 February 1339; and arrived at Pera near Constantinople on May 1. While there, the Byzantine emperor Andronicus III pled in vain for reconciliation and alliance with the western church. Leaving June 24, they sailed across the Black Sea to Caffa on the Crimea, whence they travelled to the court of Özbeg, khan of the Golden Horde, at Sarai on the Volga. The khan entertained them hospitably during the winter of 1339-40 and then sent them with an escort across the steppes to Armalec, or Almaliq (within modern Huocheng County), the northern seat of the house of Chaghatai. "There," says Marignolli, "we built a church, bought a piece of ground... sung masses, and baptized several persons, notwithstanding that only the year before the bishop (referring to Bishop of Armalec) and six other minor friars had there undergone glorious martyrdom for Christ's salvation."

=== In China ===
Quitting Almaliq in the winter of 1341, they crossed the Gobi Desert by way of Kumul (within modern Hami), reaching Khanbaliq in May or June 1342. They were well received by Toghon Temür, the last emperor of the Yuan dynasty in China. An entry in the Chinese annals fixes the year of Marignolli's presentation by its mention of the arrival of the great horses from the kingdom of the Folang (i.e., Farang or Franks), one of which was 11 feet 6 inches in length, and 6 feet 8 inches high and black all over. Marignolli stayed at Khanbaliq for three or four years, after which he travelled through southern and eastern China to Quanzhou (modern Xiamen), quitting China apparently in December 1347. He had been impressed by the Christian community in China, its imperial support, and Chinese culture.

=== Return ===
He reached Columbum (Kaulam, Kollam or Quilon in Malabar) in Easter week of 1348. At this place he found a church of the Latin communion, probably founded by Jordanus of Severac, who had been appointed Bishop of Columbum (Diocese of Quilon) by Pope John XXII in 1330. Here Marignolli remained sixteen months, after which he proceeded on what seems very much a wandering voyage. First he visited the shrine of St Thomas near the modern Madras, and then proceeded to what he calls the kingdom of Saba, and identifies with the Sheba of Scripture, but which seems from various particulars to have been Java. Taking ship again for Malabar on his way to Europe, he encountered great storms. They found shelter in the little port of Pervily or Pervilis (Beruwala or Berberyn) in the south-west of Ceylon; but here the legate fell into the hands of "a certain tyrant Coya Jaan (Khoja Jahan), a eunuch and an accursed Saracen," who professed to treat him with all deference but detained him four months and plundered all the gifts and Eastern rarities that he was carrying home. This detention in Ceylon enabled Marignolli to give a variety of curious particulars regarding Buddhist monasticism, the aboriginal races of Ceylon, and other marvels. The locals claimed that "Seyllan" (Adam's Peak) was 40 miles from Paradise, but he was unable to explore the area. After this we have only fragmentary notices, showing that his route to Europe lay by Ormuz, the ruins of Babel, Bagdad, Mosul, Aleppo and thence to Damascus and Jerusalem. In 1353, he arrived at Naples, whence he visited Florence before returning to Avignon by the end of the year. There, he delivered a letter from the great khan to Pope Innocent VI.

=== Later life ===
In the following year the Emperor Charles IV, on a visit to Italy, made Marignolli one of his chaplains. Soon after, in March 1354, the pope made him bishop of Bisignano but he seems to have been in no hurry to reside there. He appears to have accompanied the emperor to Prague in 1354–1355; in 1356 he is found acting as envoy to the Pope from Florence; and in 1357 he is at Bologna. That year, the emperor called him to be a councillor and his court historian. At his behest, Marignolli then compiled his Annals of Bohemia.

We do not know when he died. The last trace of Marignolli is a letter addressed to him, which was found in the 18th century among the records in the chapter library at Prague. The writer is an unnamed Archbishop of Armagh, easily identified with Richard Fitz Ralph, a strenuous foe of the Franciscans, who had broken lances in controversy with Ockham and Burley. The letter implies that some intention had been intimated from Avignon of sending Marignolli to Ireland in connexion with matters then in debate—a project which stirs Fitz Ralph's wrath.

== Works ==
Marignolli's primary work was his Annals or Chronicles of Bohemia (Cronica Boemorum). (Note: The Latin name also appears corrected as Chronicon Bohemiae.) The fragmentary notes of Marignolli's eastern travels often contain vivid remembrance and graphic description, but combined with excessive vanity and an incoherent lapse from one thing to another. Henry Yule described Marignolli's digressions as "like unexpected fossils in a mud-bank" but they have no claim to be called a narrative, and it is with no small pains that anything like a narrative can be pieced out of them. Indeed, the mode in which they were elicited illustrates how little medieval travellers thought of publication: The emperor Charles, instead of urging his chaplain to write a history of his vast journeys, set him to the repugnant task of recasting the annals of Bohemia and the clerk consoled himself by salting the insipid stuff with interpolations, à propos de bottes, of his recollections of Asiatic travel. Despite the sections of wonders in the work, he takes pains to deny the belief in the existence of nations of monsters or malformed humans, saying the truth is "no such people do exist as nations, though there may be an individual monster here and there".

Nobody seems to have noticed the work until 1768, when the chronicle was published in Dobner. Thus in type, Marignolli again seems to have remained unread until 1820, when a paper on his travels was published by Meinert. Kunstmann devoted one of his papers on the ecclesiastical travellers of the Middle Ages to the account.

== See also ==
- Europeans in Medieval China
