= Ma Duanlin =

Chinese writer and encyclopaedist

Ma Duanlin (simplified Chinese: 马端临; traditional Chinese: 馬端臨; pinyin: Mǎ Duānlín; Wade–Giles: Ma Tuanlin) (1245–1322) was a Chinese historical writer and encyclopaedist. In 1317, during the Yuan Dynasty, he published the comprehensive Chinese encyclopedia Wenxian Tongkao in 348 volumes.

He was born to the family of Southern Song Minister of the East Ma Tingluan, who had an extensive collection of historical documents. From 1273, Ma Duanlin started the compilation of the Wenxian Tongkao using his father's collection and advice. After the death of his father, Ma Duanlin was called to serve the Yuan dynasty and later played an important role in reviving the educational system of China.

Ma Duanlin describes Champa, Chi Tu, Pan Pan, the Khmer Empire and the Kediri Kingdom. He describes Jayavarman VII's campaign against Champa for their 1177 invasion, stating "he decided to wreak terrible vengeance on his enemies, which succeeded in doing after eighteen years of patient dissimulation."
