= Caterina Vilioni =

Italian woman who lived in China (died 1342)

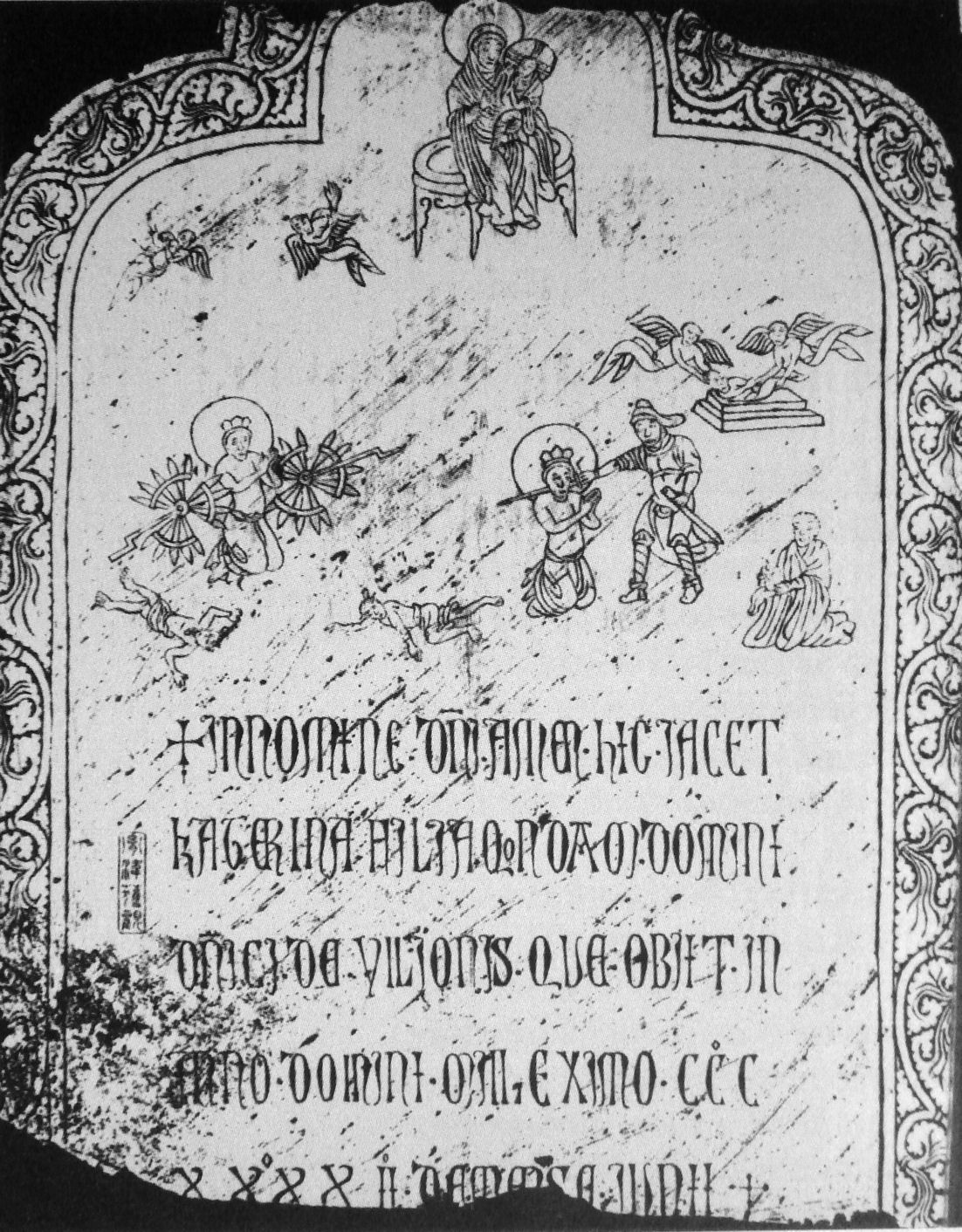
Facsimile of the illustration of the 1342 tomb of Caterina Vilioni (originally Vilionis), member of a Venetian or Genoese trading family in Yangzhou

Caterina Vilioni (died 1342) was an Italian woman and one of the first Europeans known to have resided in China. She was a member of an Italian, likely Venetian or perhaps Genoese, trading family that lived in Yangzhou during the mid-14th century.

Vilioni is known through her tombstone, which was rediscovered at Yangzhou in 1951. It suggests that Vilioni died in 1342 and was the daughter of a man named Domenico Vilioni.

== Historical background ==
The early presence of Europeans at Yangzhou may have been linked to the silk trade and a reported sojourn there, during the 1280s, by Marco Polo, who was said to have served the Chinese emperor in an official position at Yangzhou.

Members of the Franciscan order were apparently established at Yangzhou before 1322, when Odoric de Pordenone visited and resided among Franciscans there.

The existence of the tombstone suggests that, by the time Vilioni died, there was a well-established community originating from the Italian Peninsula in the city.

== Tombstone ==
The tombstone, which is inscribed in an upper-case Lombardic Latin script, reads:

In nomine D[omi]ni amen hic jacet
Katerina filia q[u]ondam Domini
D[omi]nici de Vilionis que obiit in
anno Domini mileximo (Note: Mileximo for millesimo) CCC
XXXX II de mense Junii

("In the name of the Lord, amen. Here lies Caterina, daughter of the deceased lord Domenico de Vilionis, who died in A.D. 1342, in the month of June.")

Vilioni's tombstone also carries a depiction of the martyrdom of Saint Catherine of Alexandria. As such, it may represent the oldest surviving Roman Catholic artefact in China. (Older Christian monuments in China are the work of the Nestorian Church of the East. Odoric de Pordenone also mentions the existence, in 1322, of three Nestorian churches in Yangzhou.)

The tombstone was rediscovered in 1951 by members of the People's Liberation Army, among material that had been used to build ramparts at Yangzhou.

== Later research ==
The Vilioni family of Yangzhou has been linked to Pietro Vilioni, who in 1264 was involved in trade at Tabriz (in modern Iran).

Following the rediscovery of Caterina Vilioni's tombstone, a smaller plaque was discovered in Yangzhou, with an inscription mentioning the death in November 1344 of an Antonio Vilioni, who was also a son of Domenico Vilioni.

The surname Vilioni may have been a precursor or variant of the later surname Ilioni, although this is only a hypothesis. The medieval historian Robert Lopez has suggested that the Domenico Vilioni of Yangzhou was a man named "Domenico Ilioni", who in 1348 was mentioned in records kept by the city of Genoa. The Genoese records state that Domenico Ilioni was mentioned in relation to a merchant named Jacopo de Oliverio, who was said to have lived in the "Kingdom of Cathay" (China), where he had multiplied his capital fivefold.

== Bibliography ==
- Rouleau, Francis A. (1954). "The Yangchow Latin Tombstone as a Landmark of Medieval Christianity in China". Harvard Journal of Asiatic Studies. 17 (3/4). Harvard-Yenching Institute: 346–65. doi:10.2307/2718316. JSTOR 2718316.
- Spence, Jonathan D. (1998). The Chan's Great Continent: China in Western Minds. W. W. Norton & Company. ISBN 978-0-393-02747-1.
- Wood, Frances (2002). The Silk Road: Two Thousand Years in the Heart of Asia. University of California Press. ISBN 978-0-520-24340-8.
- Ilko, Krisztina (2024). "Yangzhou, 1342: Caterina Vilioni's Passport to the Afterlife". Transactions of the Royal Historical Society (2): 1–36. doi:10.1017/S0080440124000136.
