= Yu Huan =

3rd-century historian of the state of Cao Wei

Yu Huan 魚豢
- Born: Xi'an, Shaanxi
- Occupations: Historian, travel writer
- Writing career
- Notable works: Weilüe; Dianlüe

Yu Huan (fl. third century) was a Chinese historian and travel writer of the state of Cao Wei during the Three Kingdoms period.

== Life ==
Yu Huan was from Jingzhao Commandery, which is around present-day Xi'an, Shaanxi. He is best known for writing the Weilüe and Dianlüe, (Note: not to be confused with the Sanguo Dianlüe, which was complied in the Tang dynasty by Qiu Yue and cited in Sima Guang's Zizhi Tongjian Kaoyi; Kaoyi later used "Dianlüe" as a short-form when referring to this work. The "three kingdoms" here referred to Western Wei and its successor state Northern Zhou, Eastern Wei and its successor state Northern Qi, and the Southern Dynasties which were active during the period (Liang dynasty and Chen dynasty).) privately composed histories. According to vol. 33 of the Book of Sui, the Dianlüe comprised 89 fascicles. Vol. 46 of the Old Book of Tang listed 38 volumes of the Weilüe and 50 volumes of the Dianlüe, while vol.58 of the New Book of Tang listed the Weilüe as containing 50 volumes.

Neither of these works are extant. However, a volume of the Weilüe was quoted as an extensive footnote to the Records of the Three Kingdoms in the section on the Wuhuan, Xianbei and Dongyi (Note: found in 30th fascicle) by Pei Songzhi in 429 CE. It served as an additional guide to the Western Regions on the book. The volume has only survived because it was included as a note to Records of the Three Kingdoms.

Although it seems Yu Huan never left China, he collected a large amount of information on the countries to the west of China including Parthia, India, the Roman Empire and the various routes to them. Some of this information had reached China well before Yu Huan's time, and can also be found in the sections dealing with the Western Regions of the Records of the Grand Historian, the Book of Han, and the Book of the Later Han. (Note: The Book of the Later Han was compiled in the early Liu Song dynasty, more than a century after Yu Huan's era.)

In spite of the inclusion of earlier (and sometimes fanciful) information, the Weilüe contains much new, unique and generally trustworthy material. Most of it dates from the late second and early third centuries. It is this new information that makes the Weilüe such a valuable source. While Yu Huan's own sources are difficult to assess, much of his information appears to date from the Eastern Han dynasty, before China was largely cut off from the West by civil wars and unrest along its borders during the late 2nd century CE.
