= Tianzhu (India) =

Historical East Asian name for the India and the Indian subcontinent

Chinese name
- Chinese: 天竺
Transcriptions
Standard Mandarin
- Hanyu Pinyin: tiānzhú
Wu
- Romanization: Thi-tsoq
Yue: Cantonese
- Jyutping: Tin^{1}-zuk^{1}
Southern Min
- Hokkien POJ: Thian-tiok
Middle Chinese
- Middle Chinese: tʰen ʈɨuk̚
Old Chinese
- Zhengzhang: *qʰl'iːn tuɡ

Korean name
- Hangul: 천축
- Hanja: 天竺
Transcriptions
- Revised Romanization: cheonchuk

Japanese name
- Kanji: 天竺
- Hiragana: てんじく
Transcriptions
- Romanization: tenjiku

Tianzhu (Chinese: 天竺; pinyin: Tiānzhú) is a historical Chinese name for India and broadly the Indian subcontinent. Tian (天; tiān) means "heaven", and zhu (竺; zhú) means "bamboo" in Chinese.

Tianzhu was also referred to as Wu Tianzhu (五天竺; Wǔ Tiānzhú; 'Five Indias'), because there were five geographical regions on the Indian subcontinent known to the Chinese: Central, Eastern, Northern, Southern, and Western India.

== Etymology ==
Originally pronounced as l̥induk or *qʰl'iːn tuɡ (天竺) in Old Chinese, it comes from the Chinese transliteration of unattested Old Persian diminutive *Hinduka-, which is from attested 𐏃𐎡𐎯𐎢𐏁 h-i-du-u-š (Hindu), which is itself derived from the Proto-Indo-Iranian *síndʰuš, the etymon also of Sanskrit Sindhu, the native name of the Indus River. Persians travelling in northwest India named the subcontinent after the river around the 6th century BC. Tianzhu is just one of several Chinese transliterations of Sindhu. Yuandu (身毒, OC:*‍n̥i[ŋ][d]ˤuk, mod. Yuāndú) appears in Sima Qian's Records of the Grand Historian and Tiandu (天篤; Tiāndǔ) is used in the Book of the Later Han. Yintejia (印特伽; Yìntèjiā) comes from the Kuchean Indaka, another transliteration of Hindu. The western terms of Hindu and India also ultimately derive from the same Persian concept.

== Extent ==
A detailed account of Tianzhu is given in the "Xiyu Zhuan" (Record of the Western Regions) in the Hou Hanshu compiled by Fan Ye (398–445):

"The state of Tianzhu: Also, named Yuandu, it lies several thousand li southeast of Yuezhi. Its customs are the same as those of Yuezhi, and it is low, damp, and very hot. It borders a large river. The inhabitants ride on elephants in warfare; they are weaker than the Yuezhi. They practise the way of Futu [the Buddha], [and therefore] it has become a custom [among them] not to kill or attack [others]. From west of the states Yuezhi and Gaofu, and south until the Western Sea, and east until the state of Panqi, all is the territory of Yuandu. Yuandu has several hundred separate towns, with a governor, and separate states which can be numbered in the tens, each with its own king. Although there are small differences among them, they all come under the general name of Yuandu, and at this time all are subject to Yuezhi. Yuezhi have killed their kings and established a general in order to rule over their people. The land produces elephants, rhinoceros, tortoise shell, gold, silver, copper, iron, lead, and tin. It communicates to the west with Da Qin [the Roman Empire], and [so] has the exotica of Da Qin."

== Other languages ==
In Japan, Tianzhu (天竺) is pronounced as Tenjiku. It is used in such works as the Japanese translation of Journey to the West.

In Korea, Tianzhu (天竺) is pronounced as Cheonchuk. It is used in Wang ocheonchukguk jeon (An Account of Travel to the Five Indian Kingdoms), a travelogue by the 8th century Buddhist monk Hyecho from the Korean kingdom of Silla.

== See also ==
- Names for India
