= Friedrich Hirth =

German-American sinologist (1845–1927)

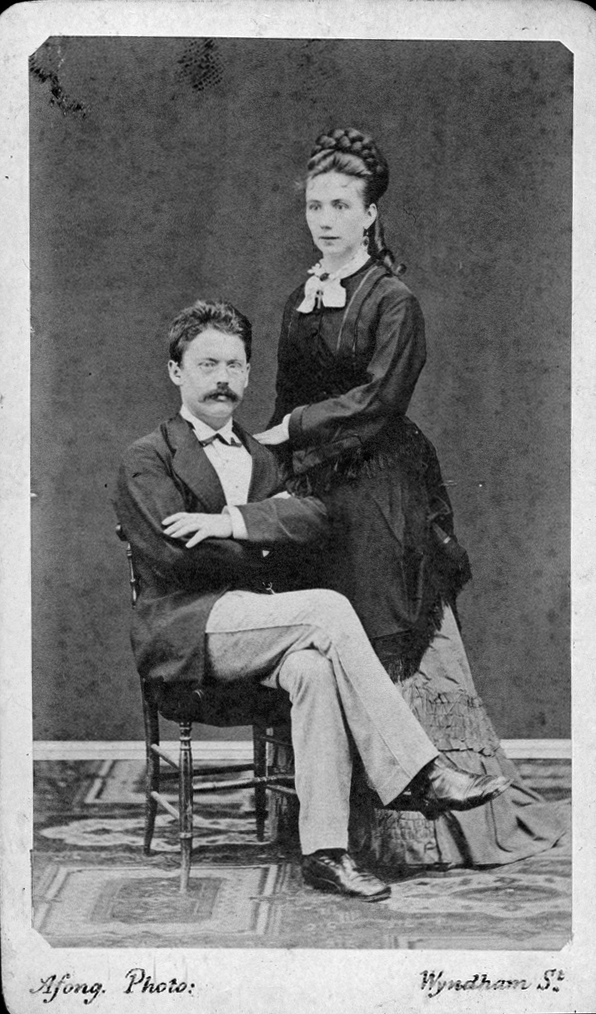
Hirth and wife in 1872

Friedrich Hirth Ph.D. (16 April 1845 in Gräfentonna, Saxe-Gotha – 10 January 1927 in Munich) was a German-American sinologist.

== Biography ==
He was educated at the universities of Leipzig, Berlin, and Greifswald (Ph.D., 1869). He was in the Chinese Maritime Customs Service from 1870 to 1897. In 1902, Professor Hirth was appointed to the first Dean Lung Professorship of Chinese at Columbia University (New York City).

Prior to World War II, a collection of Chinese manuscripts and printed books made by him was in the Royal Library at Berlin, and another of porcelains of considerable historical importance in the Gotha Museum; most of the Hirth collection from the Staatsbibliothek in Berlin is now in Kraków. As an investigator he conducted researches in Chinese literature by imitation of the methods of classical philology.

== Works ==
- "The Hoppo-Book of 1753". Journal of the North China Branch of the Royal Asiatic Society. 17: 221–235. 1882. Translates and annotates a merchant log dealing with the Superintendent of Customs or "Hoppo".
- China and the Roman Orient: Researches into their Ancient and Mediœval Relations as Represented in Old Chinese Records (1885)
- Ancient Porcelain: A Study in Chinese Mediœval Industry and Trade (1888)
- Text-Book of Documentary Chinese (two volumes, 1885–88)
  - Hsin-kuan wên-chien-lu: text book of documentary Chinese, with a vocabulary for the special use of the Chinese customs service (1885)
  - 新關文件錄 (1909)
- Notes on the Chinese documentary style (1888)
- Notes on the Chinese documentary style (1888)
- Chinesische Studien, volume i (1890)
- Index of the Characters in Dr. Hirth's "Text Book of Documentary Chinese," Arranged by Their Radicals: With a List Giving Their Tones (1892)
- Ueber fremde Einflüsse in der chinesischen Kunst (1896)
- Scraps from a Collector's Note-book, Being Notes on Some Chinese Painters of the Present Dynasty, with Appendices on Some Old Masters and Art Historians (1905)
- Syllabary of Chinese sounds (1907)
  - Research in China ...: pt. 1. Descriptive topography and geology, by Bailey Willis, Eliot Blackwelder, and R.H. Sargent. pt. 2. Petrography and zoology, by Eliot Blackwelder. Syllabary of Chinese sounds, by Friedrich Hirth (1907)
  - Chinese metallic mirrors: with notes on some ancient specimens of the Musée Guimet, Paris (1907)
- Research in China ...: pt. 1. Descriptive topography and geology, by Bailey Willis, Eliot Blackwelder, and R.H. Sargent. pt. 2. Petrography and zoology, by Eliot Blackwelder. Syllabary of Chinese sounds, by Friedrich Hirth (1907)
- Research in China ...: Systematic geology, by Bailey Willis (1907)
- The Ancient History of China to the End of the Chou Dynasty (New York: Columbia University Press, 1908) 1911 edition
- CHAU JU-KUA: His Work on the Chinese and Arab Trade in the twelfth and thirteenth Centuries, entitled Chu-fan-chï, Translated from the Chinese and Annotated by FRIEDRICH HIRTH and W. W. ROCKHILL, (1911) with W. W. Rockhill
- Research in China ... (1913)
- The Story of Chang K'ie'n, China's Pioneer in Western Asia (1917)
- Native sources for the history of Chinese pictorial art (1917)

== See also ==
- Zhao Rugua
