= Wenxian Tongkao =

Pages from a Ming dynasty printed edition of the Wenxiao Tongkao

The Wenxian Tongkao (Chinese: 文献通考; pinyin: Wénxiàn Tōngkǎo; Wade–Giles: Wenhsien T'ungk'ao; lit. 'Comprehensive Examination of Literature') or shortened as Tongkao, was one of the major encyclopedia works modelled after the Tongdian. It was compiled by Ma Duanlin in 1317 during the Yuan dynasty.

The Tang dynasty Tongdian by Du You, the Song dynasty Tongzhi by Zheng Qiao, and the Yuan dynasty Wenxian Tongkao by Ma Duanlin, were collectively referred to as the Three Tongs (三通, Santong), throughout the Yuan, Ming and Qing dynasties.
