= Island of the Jewel =

Semi-legendary island in medieval Arabic cartography

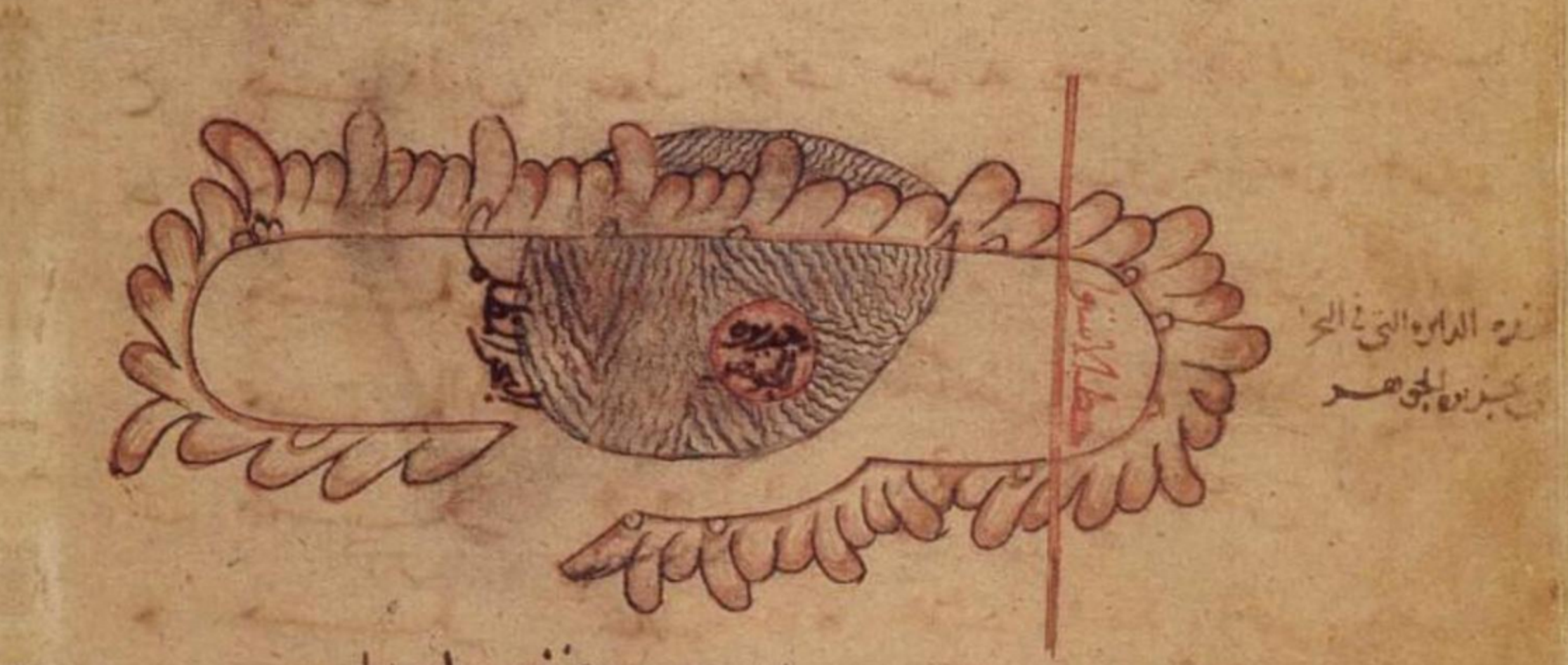
The chorographic map of the Island of the Jewel from the 1037 MS of al-Khwārizmī's Book of the Description of the Earth. (North is to the left.)

A detail of the Indian Ocean from a modern reconstruction of al-Khwārizmī's world map, showing the Island of the Jewel lying beyond the far eastern peninsula.

The Island of the Jewel (Arabic: جزيرة الجوهرة Jazīrat al-Jawhar) (Note: Sometimes also translated as Jewel Island.) or Island of Sapphires (Arabic: جزيرة الياقوت Jazīrat al-Yāqūt) was a semi-legendary island in medieval Arabic cartography, said to lie in the Sea of Darkness (Bahr az-Zulamat) near the equator, forming the eastern limit of the inhabited world.

It is first attested in the Book of the Description of the Earth compiled by al-Khwārizmī around 833. Ptolemy's map ended at 180° E. of the Fortunate Isles, without being able to explain what might lay on the imagined eastern shore of the Indian Ocean or beyond the lands of Sinae and Serica in Asia. Roman missions subsequently reached the Han court via Longbian (Hanoi) and Chinese Muslims traditionally credit the founding of their community to the Companion Saʿd ibn Abi Waqqas as early as the 7th century. Muslim merchants such as Soleiman established sizable expatriate communities; a large-scale massacre of Arabs and Persians is recorded at Yangzhou in 760. These connections showed al-Khwārizmī and other Islamic geographers that the Indian Ocean was not closed as Hipparchus and Ptolemy had held but opened either narrowly or broadly.

The four chorographic maps of the AD 1037 manuscript of al-Khwārizmī, including that depicting the Island of the Jewel, are the oldest surviving maps from the Islamic world. Al-Khwārizmī gave the Island of the Jewel as the easternmost point of the inhabited world. His gazetteer is divided by categories but altogether he provides coordinates for its coast, three cities, its surrounding chain of mountains, and two summits in the interior. It lies in the Sea of Darkness near the equator, east of the Golden Peninsula (Malaysia) and east of the still larger phantom peninsula now usually known as the Dragon's Tail. Its center was given at 173° east of al-Khwārizmī's prime meridian off west Africa, and 2° north of the equator.

It subsequently appeared in the world map of the 11th-century Book of Curiosities, where it is labelled "The Island of the Jewel, and its mountains encircle it like a basket" or "like scales", and in other medieval Arabian and Persian texts.

The real-world location that the Island of the Jewel was intended to represent is unclear. It is now typically identified with one of the Indonesian islands or with Taiwan.

== See also ==
- Geography and cartography in medieval Islam
