= Dragon's Tail (peninsula) =

Phantom peninsula in southeast Asia

The Dragon's Tail is a name for the Indochinese Peninsula in Southeast Asia which appeared in medieval Arabian and Renaissance European world maps. It formed the eastern shore of the Great Gulf (Gulf of Thailand) east of the Golden Chersonese (Malay Peninsula), replacing the "unknown lands" which Ptolemy and others had thought surrounded the "Indian Sea".

== Name ==
The peninsula known to modern cartographers as the "Dragon's Tail" or "Tiger's Tail" appeared under various names on different maps.

== History ==
Hubert Daunicht's reconstruction of the section of al-Khwārizmī's world map concerning the Indian Ocean. The Dragon's Tail, or the eastern opening of the Indian Ocean, which does not exist in Ptolemy's description, is traced in very little detail on the far right side of al-Khwārizmī's map.

=== Early history ===
The peninsula does not appear in any surviving manuscript of Ptolemy's Geography or other Greek geographers. Instead, it is first attested in the Ptolemaic-influenced Book of the Description of the Earth compiled by al-Khwārizmī around 833 AD. Ptolemy's map ended at 180°E of the Fortunate Isles without being able to explain what might lie on the imagined eastern shore of the Indian Ocean or beyond the lands of the Sinae and of Serica in Asia. Chinese Muslims traditionally credit the Companion Saʿd ibn Abi Waqqas with having missionized the country as early as the 7th century; the trading community was large enough that a large-scale massacre is recorded at Yangzhou in 760. Merchants such as Soleiman showed Al-Khwārizmī that the Indian Ocean was not closed as Hipparchus and Ptolemy had held but opened either narrowly or broadly. Al-Khwārizmī left most of Ptolemy's eastern coast but the creation of the strait created a new peninsula, beyond which he placed the Sea of Darkness and the Island of the Jewel.

=== Age of Discovery ===
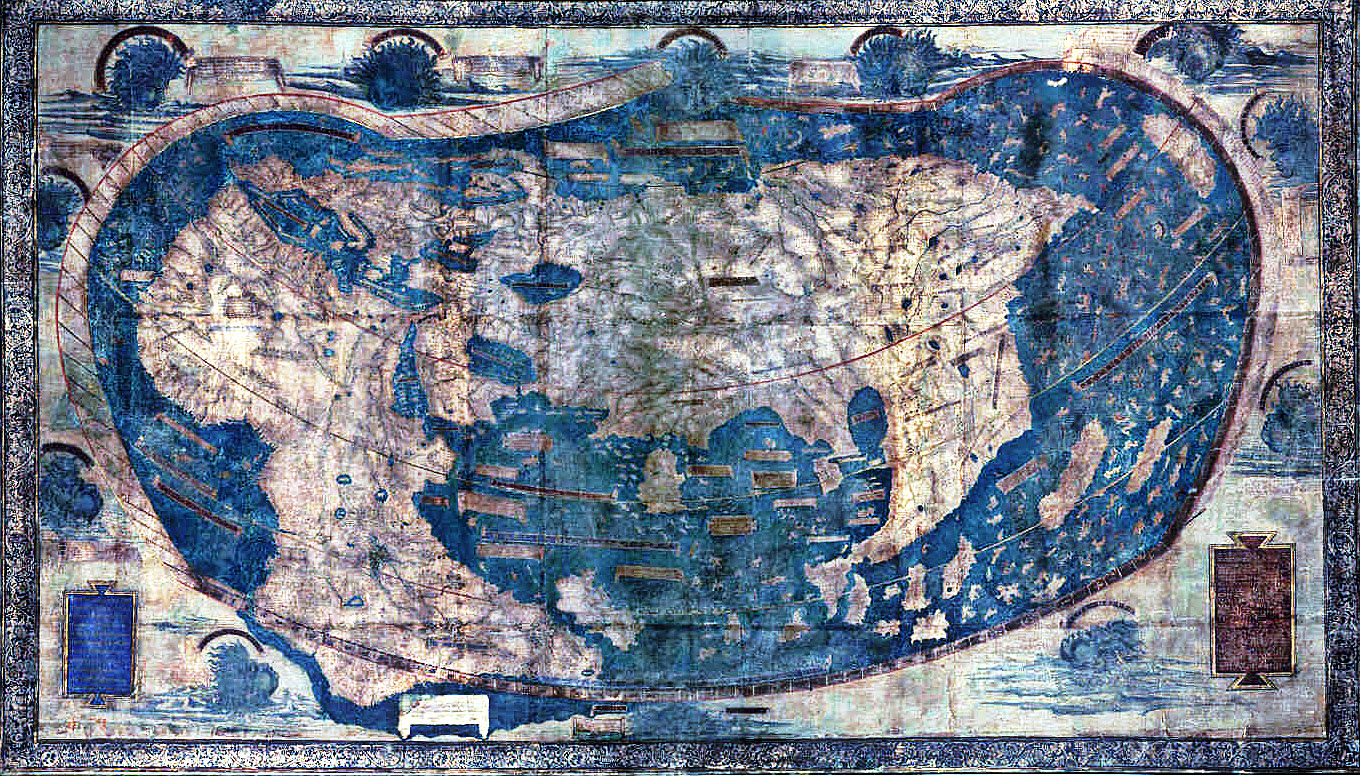
The c. 1490 Martellus world map held by Yale University, the first Ptolemaic map in Europe to include the Dragon's Tail rather than leave the Indian Ocean landlocked

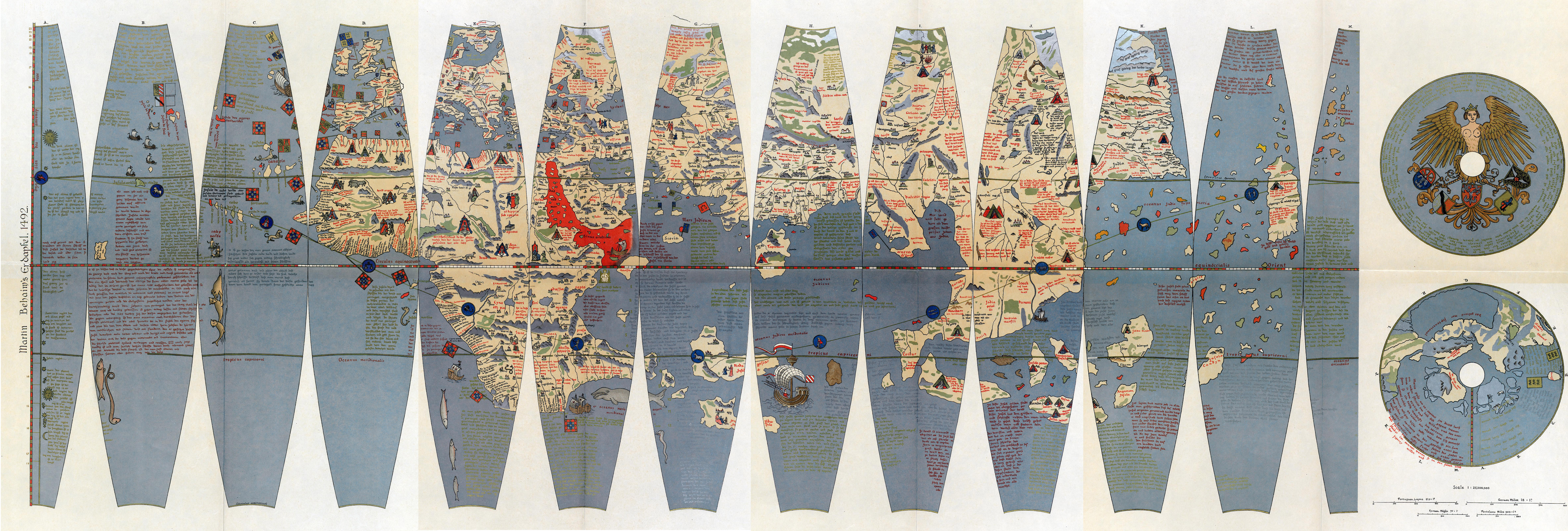
Martin of Bohemia's Erdapfel

Bartholomew Dias passed the Cape of Good Hope during a major storm in 1488; within a year or two, Martellus had published a world map showing the communication of the Atlantic and Indian Oceans, creating an unconnected south point of Africa and transforming the eastern end of Ptolemy's shoreline into a great peninsula, similar to that described by Al-Khwārizmī. The area was detailed with locations from Marco Polo and other travelers, including positions formerly related to Ptolemy's Golden Chersonese. A similar peninsula then appeared on the Erdapfel globe drafted by Martin of Bohemia in 1492, just prior to Columbus's return. In the mid-16th century, António Galvão mentioned a map that had been purchased in 1428 by Dom Pedro, eldest son of John I, which described the Cape of Good Hope and included "the Strait of Magellan" under the name "Dragon's Tail" (Portuguese: Cola do dragam). Some South American scholars have taken this at face value as evidence of early and thorough exploration of the Americas, but their claims have not been substantiated.

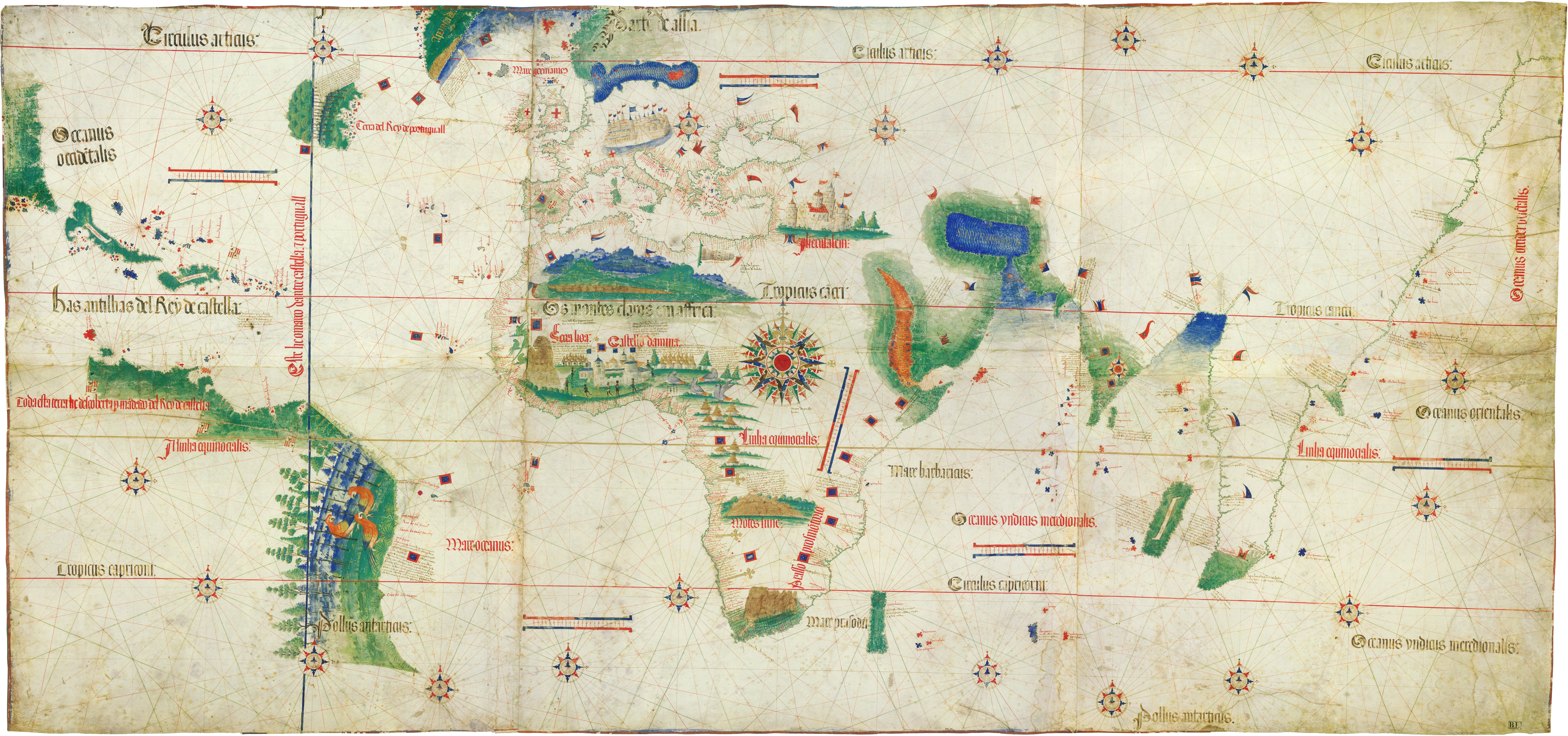
The 1502 Cantino planisphere, showing the Dragon's Tail united with the Golden Chersonese.

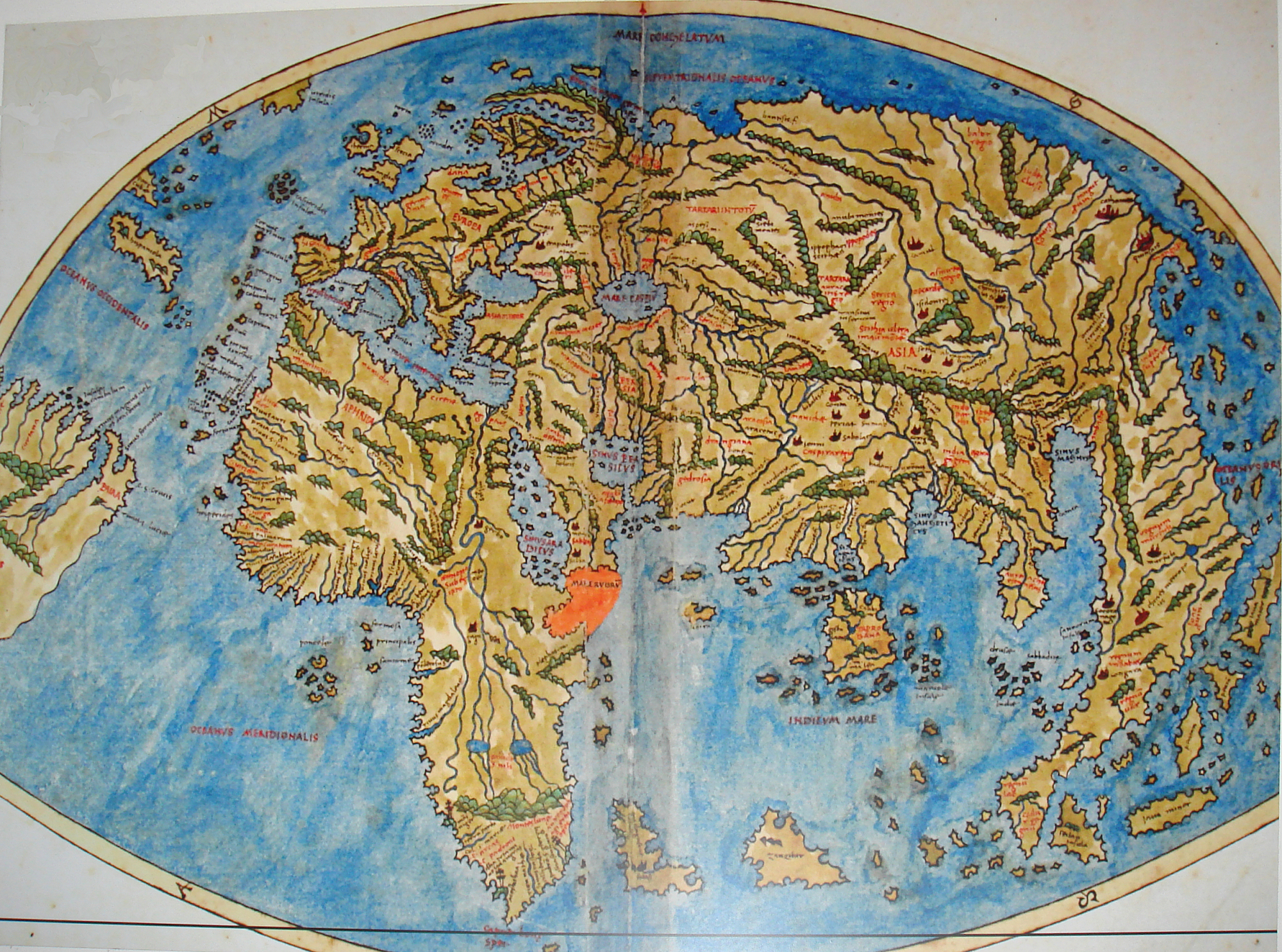
Pietro Coppo's map (1520) is one of the last ones to show the Dragon's Tail.

Christopher Columbus—at least initially—believed in the existence of the peninsula, whose position and attendant islands considerably shortened the expected distance from the African coast to East Asia. He may have been guided directly by Martellus's maps. Columbus considered himself to have arrived at Champa, which figured prominently in three inscriptions on Martellus's 1491 map, and cartographers began to draw discoveries in Central America on the eastern shore of the phantom peninsula. Amerigo Vespucci also considered himself to have arrived at this peninsula rather than a new world.

Another form of this peninsula appeared in the 1502 Cantino planisphere smuggled out of Portugal for the Duke of Ferrara. The map has lost the Great Gulf and the peninsula continues to be too large, but it has merged with the Golden Chersonese as a single landform and bent more towards the east, apparently influenced by Arabic sources.

The Portuguese were aware of the peninsula's likely nonexistence by shortly after the fall of Malacca, when Albuquerque acquired a large Javanese map of Southeast Asia. The original was lost aboard the Froll de la Mar shortly afterwards but a tracing by Francisco Rodrigues was sent in its place as part of a letter to the king. (Note: Albuquerque emphasized the particular trustworthiness of the information: "I discussed the reliability of this map with the pilot and Pero d'Alpoem so that they might fully inform Your Highness; you may take this pedaço de padram ["piece of map"] at face value and as being based on sound information, as it shows the genuine routes [the locals] follow on the way out and back.") Nonetheless, published maps continued to include it in different forms for another century.

== Details ==
The southern end of the peninsula was generally known as the Cape of Cattigara.

Martellus's world maps include labels marking the areas of Upper India (India Superior), Champa (Ciamba Provincia), and Greater Champa (Ciamba Magna Provincia).

== See also ==
- Cà Mau Peninsula
- Golden Peninsula, another peninsula which appeared in early and medieval world maps
