= Golden Chersonese =

Ancient Greek and Roman name for the Malay Peninsula

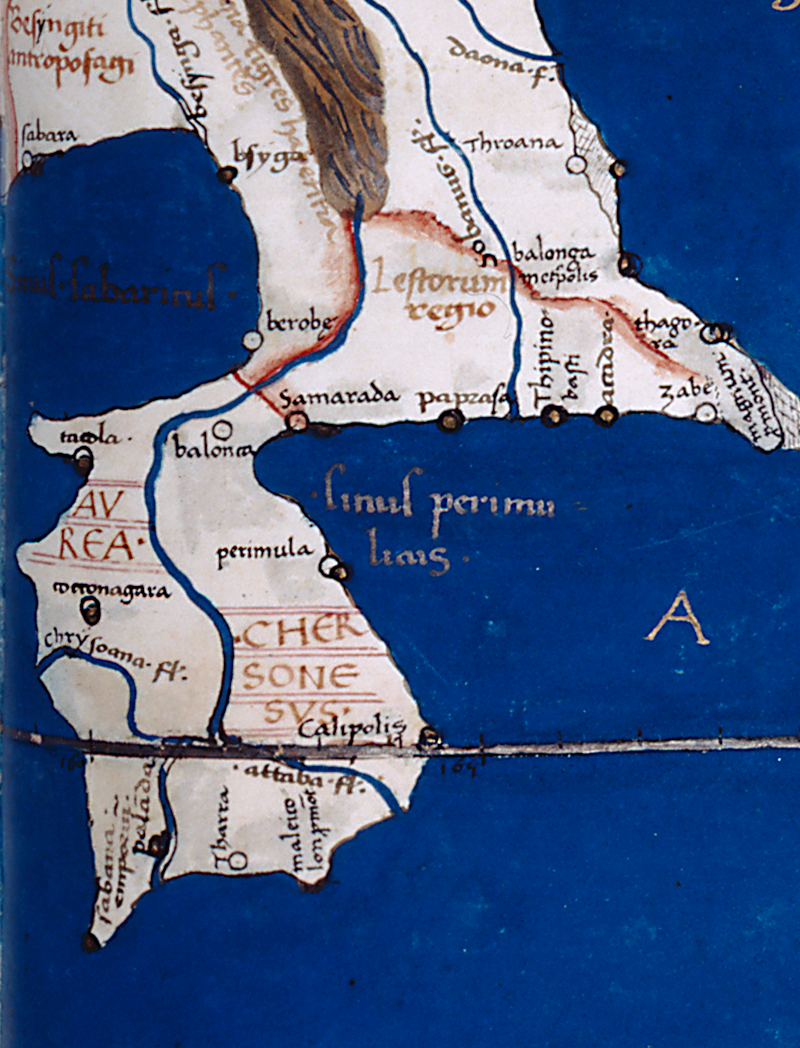
Details from Nicolaus Germanus's 1467 copy of a map from Ptolemy's Geography, showing the Golden Chersonese, i.e. the Malay Peninsula of Malaysia in the modern world. The horizontal line represents the Equator, which is misplaced too far north due to its being calculated from the Tropic of Cancer using the Ptolemaic degree that is only five-sixths of a true degree.

The Golden Chersonese or Golden Khersonese (Ancient Greek: Χρυσῆ Χερσόνησος, Chrysḗ Chersónēsos; Latin: Chersonesus Aurea), meaning the Golden Peninsula, was the name used for the Malay Peninsula by Greek and Roman geographers in classical antiquity, most famously in Claudius Ptolemy's 2nd-century Geography.

== Name ==
The earliest references to a fabulous land of gold that could be interpreted as places in Southeast Asia may be found in Indian literature. In the Ramayana, there are mentions of Suvarnabhumi (Land of Gold) and Suvarnadvipa (the Golden Island or Peninsula, where dvipa might refer to either a peninsula or an island) Greek knowledge of lands to their east improved after the conquests of Alexander the Great, but specific references to places in Southeast Asia did not appear until after the rise of the Roman Empire. Greek and Roman geographers Eratosthenes, Dionysius Periegetes, and Pomponius Mela had written about a Golden Isle (Khrysē, Chryse Insula), (Note: May also be translated in forms such as the Isle of Chryse, Chryse Island, &c.) which some in modern times have argued refers to Sumatra while excluding the Malay Peninsula. Pliny the Elder in Natural History, however, referred to Chryse as both a promontory and an island.

Ptolemy's Geography, based on the work by Marinus of Tyre, contains the best-known and perhaps the earliest reference to the Golden Chersonese. However, Geography includes information added by later geographers, and the first specific mention of the Golden Chersonese may be in the work of Marcian of Heraclea. Chersonese means peninsula in Greek, and although a few early scholars had attempted to link the Golden Chersonese with Lower Burma, the term is now generally accepted to mean the Malay Peninsula. The Malay Peninsula is thought to have been a producer of gold in ancient times, and gold mines in Patani and Pahang were still mentioned in the 17th century by the Malay-Portuguese writer Godinho de Erédia. Although gold is no longer a major product of modern-day Malaysia, it is still being mined, for example in Raub in Pahang.

== Cartographic references ==
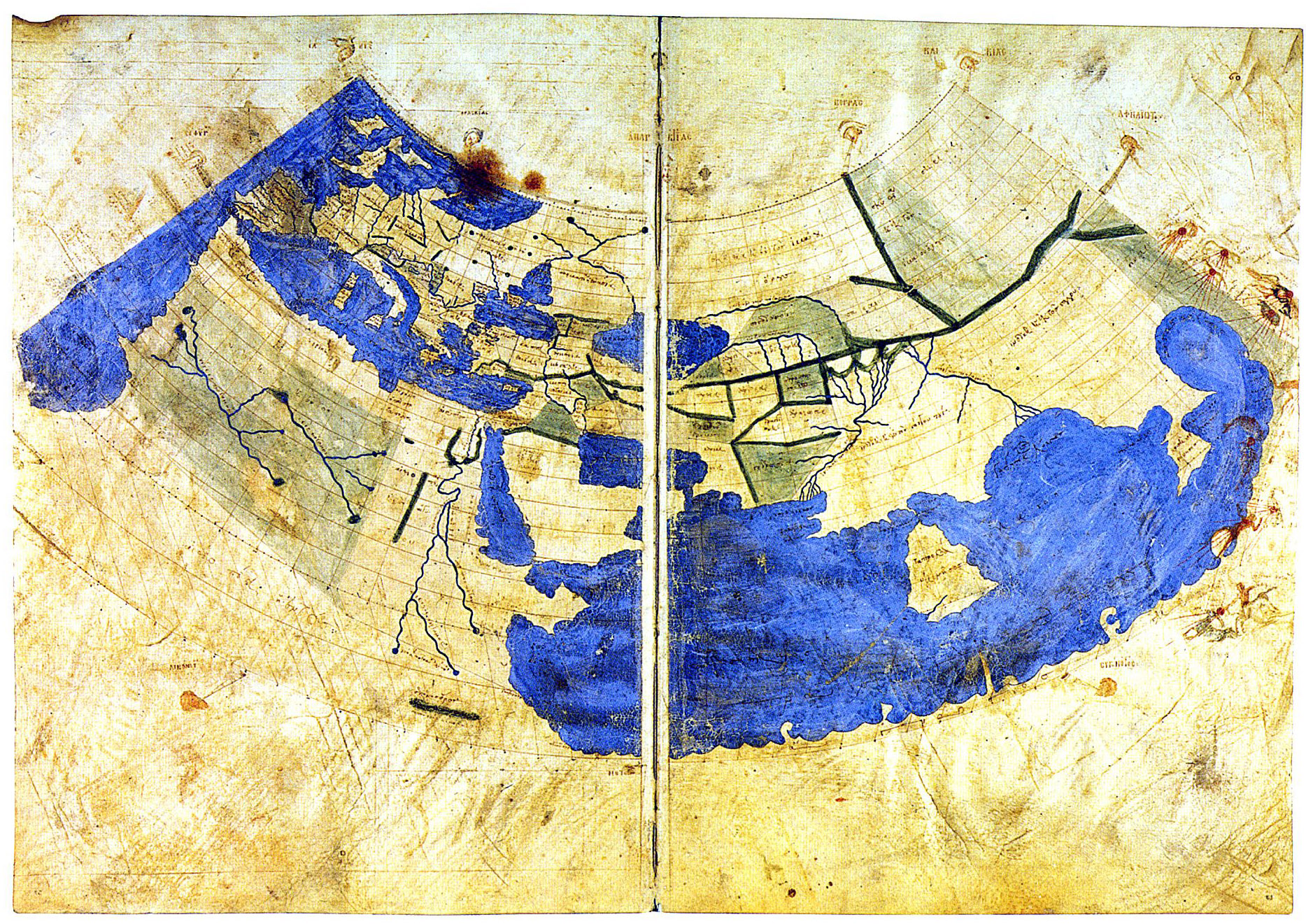
The world map from Urb. Gr. 82, done according to Ptolemy's 1st projection c. 1300. The Indian Ocean is depicted as a closed basin. The Golden Chersonese is the peninsula to the far east, just prior to the Great Gulf.

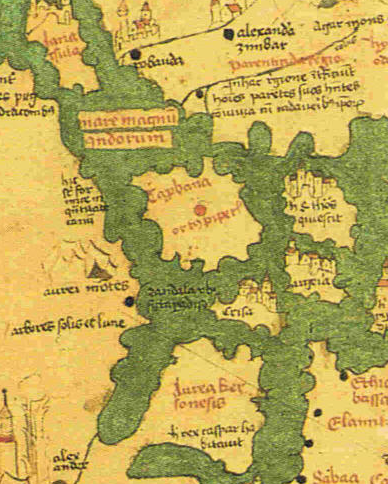
Aurea Cersonese, the Golden Peninsula, near Java in the Indian Ocean, on the map of Andreas Walsperger, c.1448

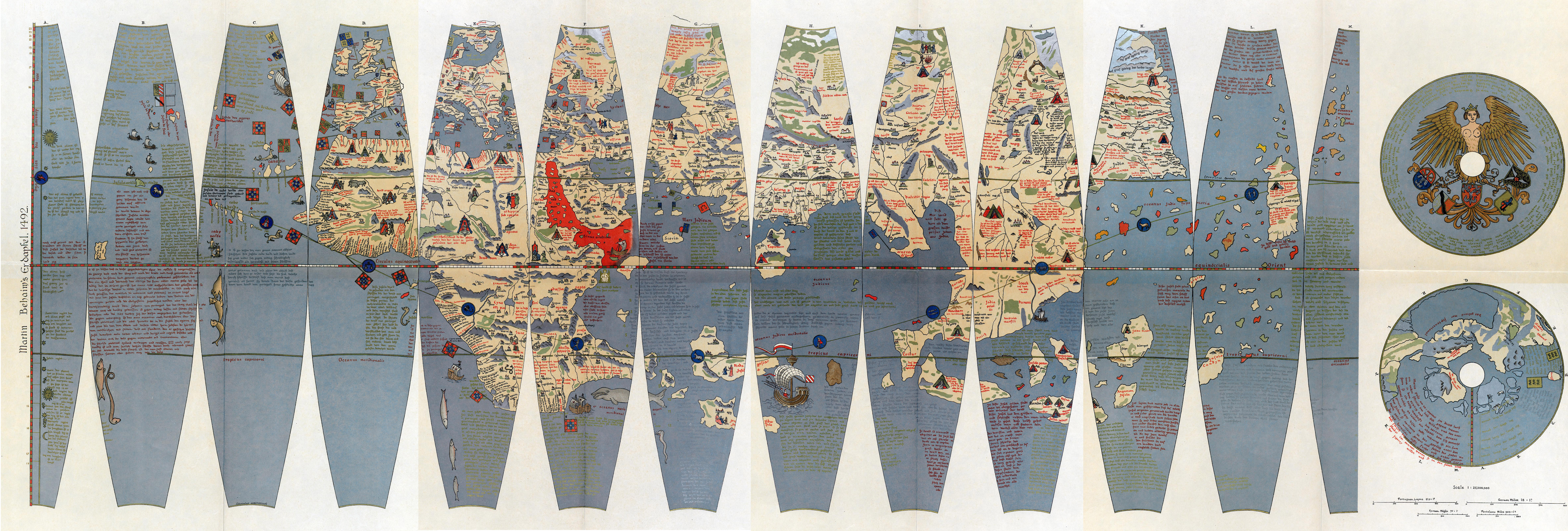
Martin of Bohemia's Erdapfel

The Golden Chersonese appears in the map of Ptolemy, which gives some geographical locations on the peninsula. The earliest surviving maps of Ptolemy, however, came from the end of the 13th century. Note that Ptolemy, like many early geographers, believed the Indian Ocean to be a closed sea, and maps based on Ptolemy's work show the Golden Chersonese located within a closed basin. Arab geographers were aware that the idea of the Indian Ocean as a closed basin was a mistake by the 8th century, for example in the work of al-Khwārizmī, Book of the Description of the Earth. They showed that the Indian Ocean might be linked to the World Oceans, with the eastern limit of the inhabited world beyond the Malay Peninsula being the Island of the Jewel in the Sea of Darkness. The Ptolemaic eastern shore became the Dragon's Tail peninsula.

The Golden Chersonese is shown on the mappa mundi of Andreas Walsperger made in Constance around 1448. It bears the inscription, hic rex caspar habitavit (here lived King Caspar). Caspar was one of the Three Magi who worshipped the newborn Christ at Bethlehem.

Martin of Bohemia, on his 1492 geographical globe, located the islands of Chryse and Argyre ("Gold" and "Silver") in the vicinity of Zipangu (Japan), which was said to be "rich in gold" by Marco Polo. An expedition was sent to find the purported islands in this location under the command of Pedro de Unamuno in 1587.

== Geographical locations ==
The names of various geographical features and settlements of the Golden Chersonese are given in Ptolemy's Geography, including towns and rivers. Different identities however have been suggested by different scholars for these names. Although coordinates are given for many of these places, they are not considered reliable for places so far away from the Mediterranean as they may not be based on astronomical observation, and therefore cannot be reliably used for identification. Ptolemy's work was also copied and translated over many hundreds of years, with the oldest surviving version copied over a thousand years after it was written, and errors may have been introduced.

=== Rivers ===
The Ptolemy map shows three rivers which are joined together to form as their source a single river which does not actually exist. It has however been suggested that this might be an indication of the existence of an ancient transpeninsular route that linked Perak and Pahang, a short cut between the east and west coasts of the Malay Peninsula.

- Khrysoanas, meaning "River of Gold", proposed to be various rivers on the west coast, from the Trang River (in southern Thailand) or Lungu River, to the Perak River or the Bernam River, or further south the Muar River.
- Palandas, proposed to be the Johor River by a number of scholars.
- Attabas, which most authors agreed to be the Pahang River.

=== Settlements ===
- Takola – a trading emporion, located at Trang in southern Thailand according to most authors. Takua Pa is another suggestion. Takola was known to the Indians in ancient times; a place named Takkola is mentioned in the 2nd or 3rd century Indian texts Maha Niddesa and Milinda Panha, and it is also considered to be the same as the Talaittakkōlam mentioned in the 1030 Tanjore inscription as one of the places conquered by Rajendra Chola in his invasion of Srivijaya. These Indian sources indicate the existence of Takola from the 3rd to 11th century.
- Konkonagara – a place near the Khrysoanas, with many scholars placing it in Perak (e.g. at Kuala Kangsar, in the Kinta District, or along the Bernam river), but some placed it further north on the Muda River in Kedah, or in Krabi opposite Phuket in Thailand. It is thought to be an Indian name, but it has also been proposed to be a hybrid of Malay and Sanskrit – kolong-kolong (or kekolong) and negara, meaning "the country of mines". Some writers have suggested link with Gangga Negara.
- Sabara or Sabana – the second emporion, variously proposed to be in Selangor or near Klang, or just south of Malacca, or south Johor, as well as Singapore.
- Tharra – at least 10 different sets of coordinates have been given in different texts for this site, it is therefore difficult to pinpoint and there is no agreement in its identification. Locations in Terengganu, Pahang and Johor have been suggested.
- Palanda – suggested to be Kota Tinggi by a few authors.
- Kalonka – various sites ranging from Chumphon Province in southern Thailand to the Pahang River basin have been proposed.
- Kole polis – thought to be located on the north east coast of the Malay Peninsula, and suggested to be in Kelantan, or somewhere between Kemaman River and Kuantan.
- Perimula - placed on the north east coast of the Malay Peninsula, suggestions include Ligor, the deltas of Kelantan or Trengganu River, and Redang Island.

=== Other features ===
- Cape Maleou-kolon – the name appears to refer to a "Malay Point", perhaps the south east corner of the Malay Peninsula. Some have identified it as Tanjung Penyabong or Tanjung Tenggaroh in Johor to Tanjung Gelang in Pahang.
- The Perimulikos gulf – possibly the Gulf of Siam, although alternative proposals ranging from the Bay of Patani to the lake of Tale Sap in Songkhla have been suggested.

== See also ==
- Cathay
- Kattigara
- Suvarnabhumi
- Serica
- "Great Golden Peninsula", another gold-related name used for Southeast Asia by Chinese emigrants in later times
- Mainland Southeast Asia
- History of Malaysia
