= Magnus Sinus =

Ancient cartographical feature known today as the Gulf of Thailand and surrounding areas

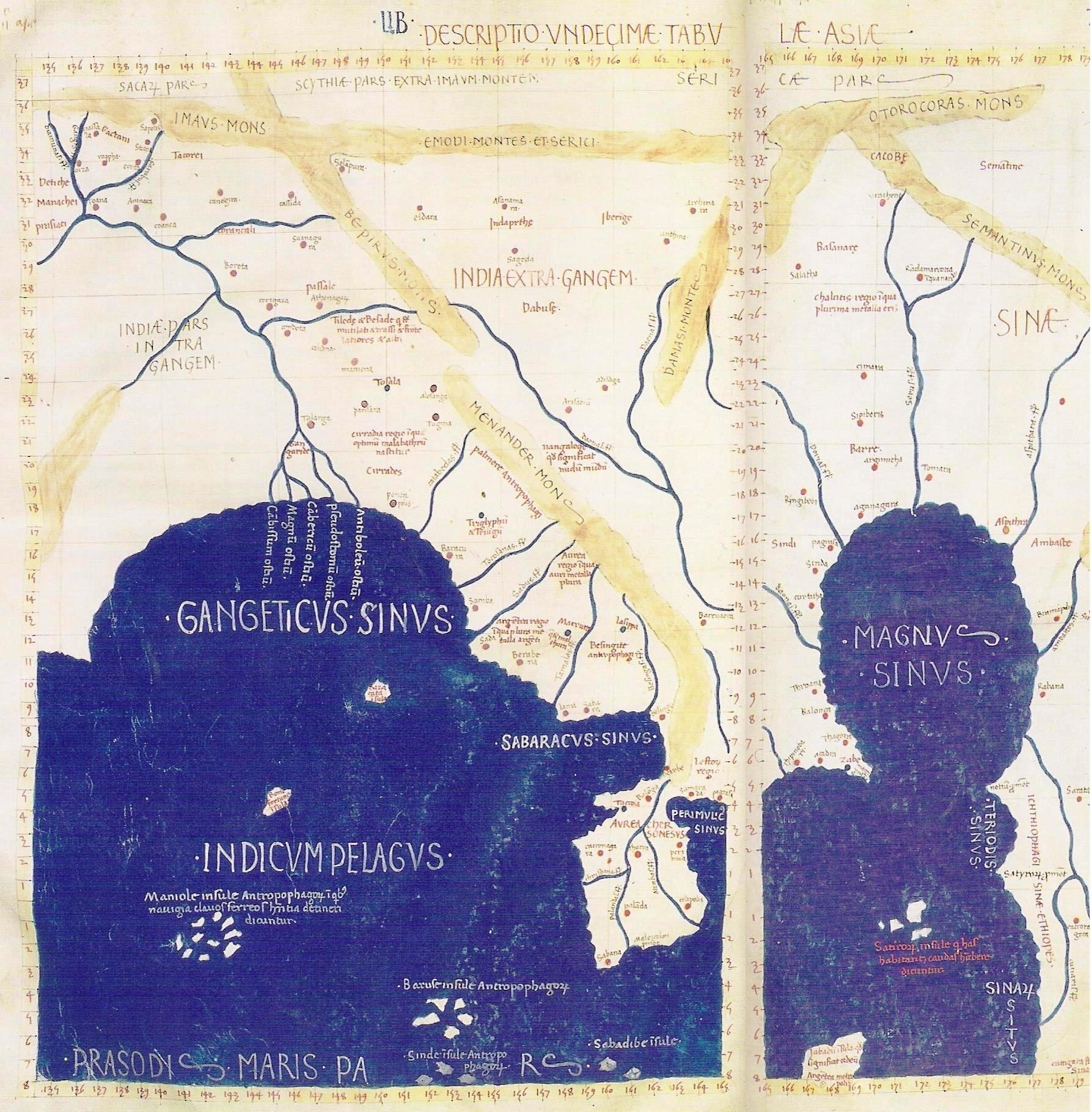
The 11th Asian regional map from Ptolemy's Geography (Harleian MS 7182)

The Magnus Sinus or Sinus Magnus (Latin; Ancient Greek: ὀ Μέγας Κόλπος, o Mégas Kólpos), also anglicized as the Great Gulf, was the form of the Gulf of Thailand and South China Sea known to Greek, Roman, Arab, Persian, and Renaissance cartographers before the Age of Discovery. It was then briefly conflated with the Pacific Ocean before disappearing from maps.

== History ==
The gulf and its major port of Cattigara had supposedly been reached by a 1st-century Greek trader named Alexander, who returned safely and left a periplus of his voyage. His account that Cattigara was "some days" sail from Zaba was taken by Marinus of Tyre to mean "numberless" days and by Ptolemy to mean "a few". (Note: "Marinus does not exhibit the mileage from the Golden Chersonese to Cattigara. But he says that Alexander has described the land beyond to lie facing the south, and that after sailing by this for 20 days you reach the city of Zaba, and still saying on for some days southward but rather to the left [i.e., east] you reach Cattigara. He exaggerates the distance, for the expression is some days not many days. He says indeed that no numerical statement of the days was made because they were so many: but this I take to be ridiculous.") Both Alexander and Marinus's works have been lost, but were claimed as authorities by Ptolemy in his Geography. Ptolemy (and presumably Marinus before him) followed Hipparchus in making the Indian Ocean a landlocked sea, placing Cattigara on its unknown eastern shoreline. The expanse formed between it and the Malay Peninsula (the "Golden Chersonese"), he called the Great Gulf.

Ptolemy's Geography was translated into Arabic by a team of scholars including al-Khwārizmī in the 9th century during the reign of al-Maʿmūn. By that time, Arab merchants such as Soleiman had begun regular commerce with Tang China and, having passed through the Strait of Malacca en route, shown that the Indian Sea communicated with the open ocean. African traders similarly showed that the coastline did not turn sharply east south of Cape Prasum below Zanzibar as Ptolemy held. Al-Khwārizmī's influential Book of the Description of the Earth, therefore, removed Ptolemy's unknown shores from the Indian Ocean. The robustly-described lands east of the Great Gulf, however, were retained as a phantom peninsula (now generally known as the Dragon's Tail).

Just after 1295, Maximus Planudes restored Ptolemy's Greek text and maps at Chora Monastery in Constantinople (Istanbul). This was translated into Latin at Florence by Jacobus Angelus around 1406 and quickly spread the work's information and misinformation throughout Western Europe. The maps initially repeated Ptolemy's enclosed Indian Sea. Following word of Bartholomew Dias's circumnavigation of Africa, maps by Martellus and by Martin of Bohemia replaced this with a new form of the Dragon's Tail peninsula, including details from Marco Polo. As early as 1540, continuing exploration led Sebastian Münster to conflate the Great Gulf with the Pacific Ocean west of the Americas, supposing that the 1st-century Alexander had crossed to a port in Peru and safely returned. The idea was repeated by Ortelius and others. (Some modern South American scholars have returned to the idea as recently as the 1990s, but there remains no substantial evidence to support the idea.) The Great Gulf was finally dispensed with in all its forms as more accurate accounts returned from both the East and West Indies.

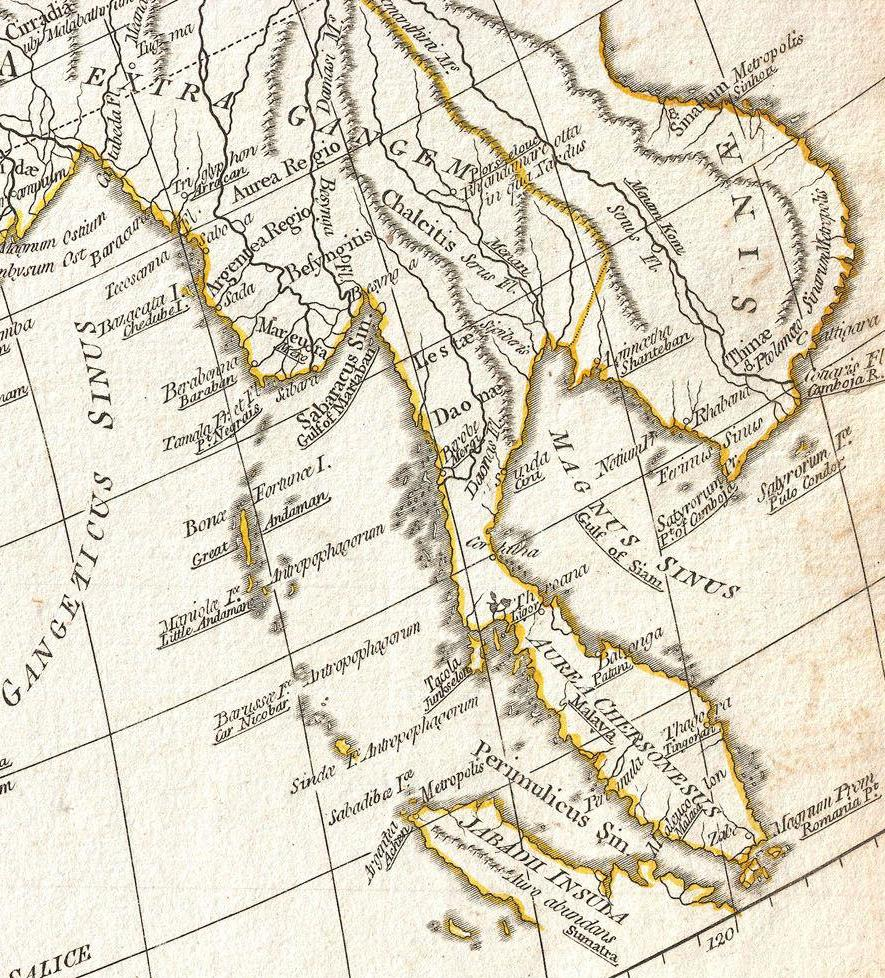
A detail from a 1794 map showing the common identification of the Great Gulf with the Gulf of Thailand

== Details ==
The details of the Great Gulf changed somewhat among its various forms, but the ancient and Renaissance Ptolemaic accounts had it bound on the west by the Golden Chersonese and on the north and east by the ports of the Sinae, chief among which was Cattigara. Medieval Islamic cartographers followed al-Khwārizmī in having a strait southeast of the gulf communicating with the Sea of Darkness. Believing the circumference of the Earth to follow Ptolemy's reduced figures or even smaller ones, cartographers during the early phases of the Age of Discovery expanded the Gulf to form the Pacific Ocean west of South America, considered to represent a southeastern peninsula of Asia.

Modern reconstructions agree in naming the Golden Chersonese a form of the Malay Peninsula but differ in their considerations of how much of the South China Sea to include within Ptolemy's reckoning of the Great Gulf. Those following Alexander's route from Zaba on its northern shore to Cattigara to its southeast consider it to be no more than the Gulf of Thailand, with Cattigara located in the Funanese Óc Eo ruins at Thoại Sơn. Its Cottiaris River would then be a former course of the Mekong which once passed the site to enter the Gulf of Thailand. Others ignoring the route as garbled but taking Cattigara to be the major Han entrepôt of Longbian consider the Great Gulf to have been the Gulf of Tonkin, hypothesizing that the Gulf of Thailand (if present) was represented by the smaller inlet on the eastern shore of the Golden Chersonese. Its Cottiaris River would have been Vietnam's Red River. Panyu (Guangzhou) had been the major port of the Kingdom of Nanyue but identifications of Ptolemy's Cattigara with Han-era Nanhai, though common in the past, are credited little more than those placing it in Peru.
