= Algorist =

Algorist may refer to:

- A person skilled in the technique of performing basic decimal arithmetic, known as algorism
- A person skilled in the design of algorithms
- An algorithmic artist
