= Óc Eo =

Óc Eo Thị trấn Óc Eo
- Township (Class-5)
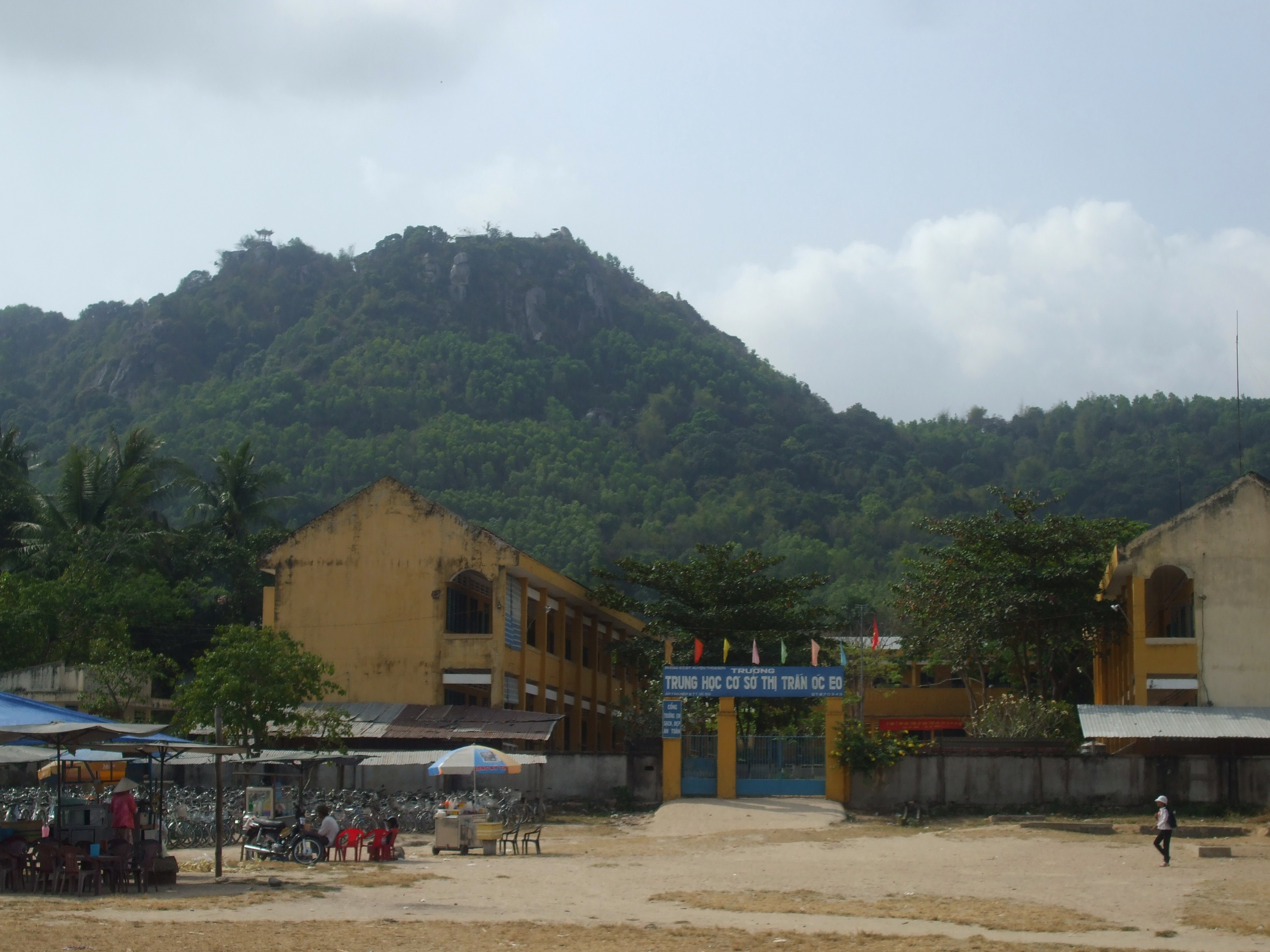
- Mount Ba Thê, in Óc Eo town, Thoại Sơn district, An Giang Province.

- Location in Vietnam
- Coordinates: 10°13′58″N 105°9′6″E
- Country: Vietnam
- Region: Mekong Delta
- Province: An Giang Province
- District: Thoại Sơn District
- Time zone: UTC+7 (ICT)

Óc Eo (Vietnamese) is an archaeological site in modern-day Óc Eo commune of Thoại Sơn District in An Giang Province of southern Vietnam. Located in the Mekong Delta, Óc Eo was a busy port of the kingdom of Funan between the 2nd century BC and 12th century AD and it may have been the port known to the Greeks and Romans as Cattigara.

Scholars use the term Óc Eo culture to refer to the archaeological culture of the Mekong Delta that is typified by the artifacts recovered at Óc Eo through archaeological investigation.

== Archaeological site ==
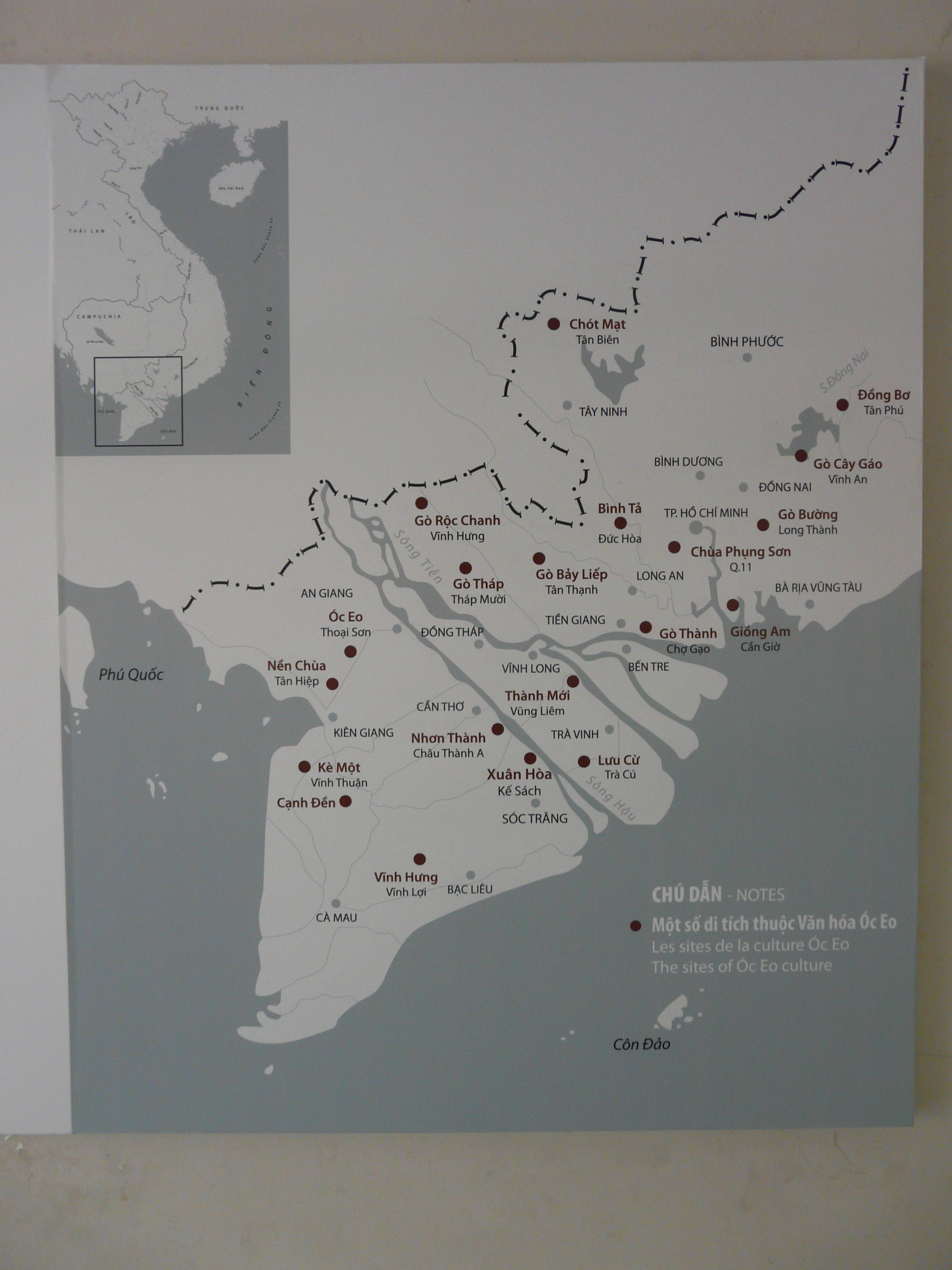
This map shows the locations of archeological sites associated with Óc Eo culture. It is located at the Museum of Vietnamese History, Ho Chi Minh City.

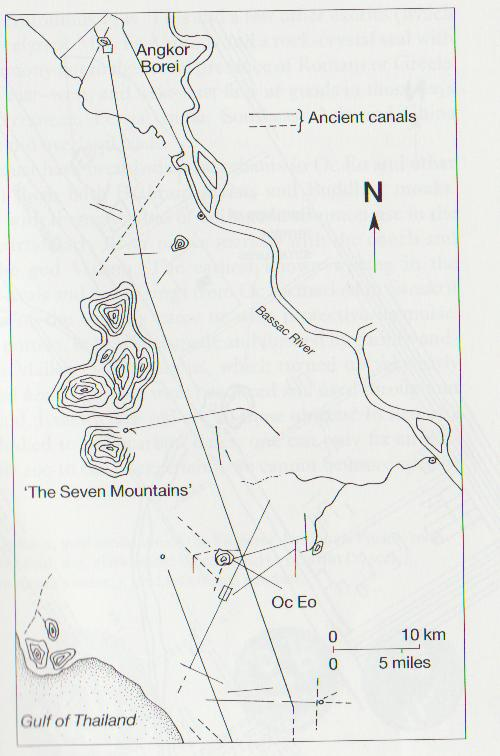
The ancient canal linking Óc Eo to Angkor Borei

Excavation at Óc Eo began on 10 February 1942, after French archaeologists had discovered the site through the use of aerial photography. The first excavations were led by Louis Malleret, who identified the site as the place called Cattigara by Roman merchants in the first centuries of the Roman Empire. The site covers 450 hectares.

Óc Eo is situated within a network of ancient canals that crisscross the low flatland of the Mekong Delta. One of the canals connects Óc Eo to the town's seaport while another goes 68 kilometres (42 mi) north-northeast to Angkor Borei. Óc Eo is longitudinally bisected by a canal, and there are four transverse canals along which pile-supported houses were perhaps ranged.

Archaeological sites reflecting the material culture of Óc Eo are spread throughout southern Vietnam, but are most heavily concentrated in the area of the Mekong Delta to the south and west of Ho Chi Minh City. The most significant site, aside from Óc Eo itself, is at Tháp Muời north of the Tiền Giang River, where among other remains a stele with a 6th-century Sanskrit text has been discovered.

Aerial photography in 1958 revealed that a distributary of the Mekong entered the Gulf of Thailand during the Funan period in the vicinity of Ta Keo, which was then on the shore but since then become separated from the sea by some distance as a result of siltation. At that time, Ta Keo was connected by a canal with Óc Eo, allowing it access to the Gulf. The distributary of the Mekong revealed in the aerial photography was probably the Saenus mentioned in Ptolemy’s Geography as the western branch of the Mekong, which Ptolemy called the Cottiaris. The Cattigara in Ptolemy's Geography could be derived from a Sanskrit word, either Kottinagara (Strong City) or Kirtinagara (Renowned City).

== Remains ==
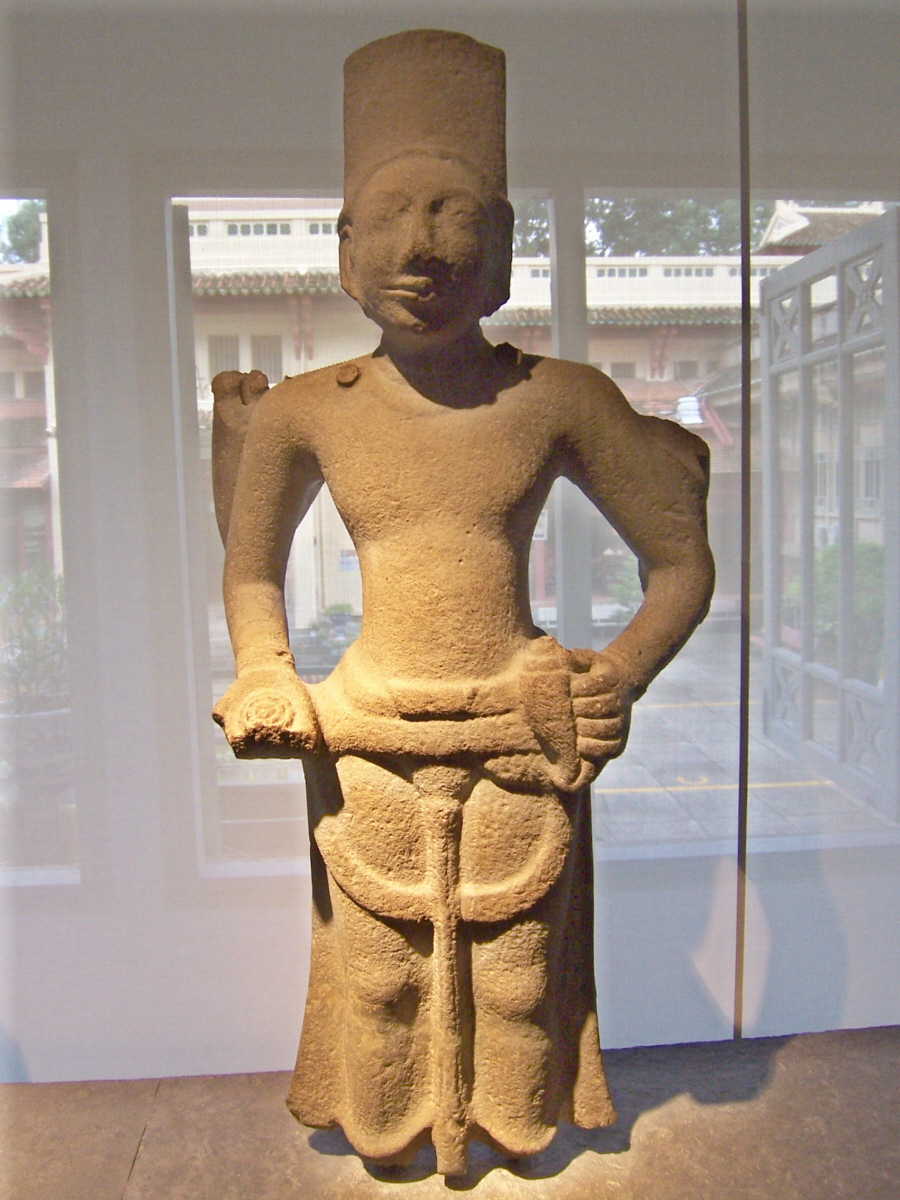
This statue of Vishnu, Vaishnava deity of Dharmic religions of South Asia, here with a particularly South East Asian form and countenance, from the 6th or 7th century AD was found in Óc Eo and is now housed in the Museum of Vietnamese History.

The remains found at Óc Eo include pottery, tools, jewelry, casts for making jewelry, coins, and religious statues. Among the finds are gold jewellery imitating coins from the Roman Empire of the Antonine period. Roman golden medallions from the reign of Antoninus Pius, and possibly his successor Marcus Aurelius, have been discovered at Óc Eo, which was near Chinese-controlled Jiaozhou and the region where Chinese historical texts claim the Romans first landed before venturing further into China to conduct diplomacy in 166. Many of the remains have been collected and are on exhibition in Museum of Vietnamese History in Ho Chi Minh City.

Among the coins found at Óc Eo by Malleret were eight made of silver bearing the image of the hamsa or Vietnamese crested argus, apparently minted in Funan.

In July 2023, a stone slab that is roughly the size and shape of an anvil was discovered at Óc Eo, marking the earliest known example of spice processing in Southeast Asia.

== Óc Eo and Funan ==
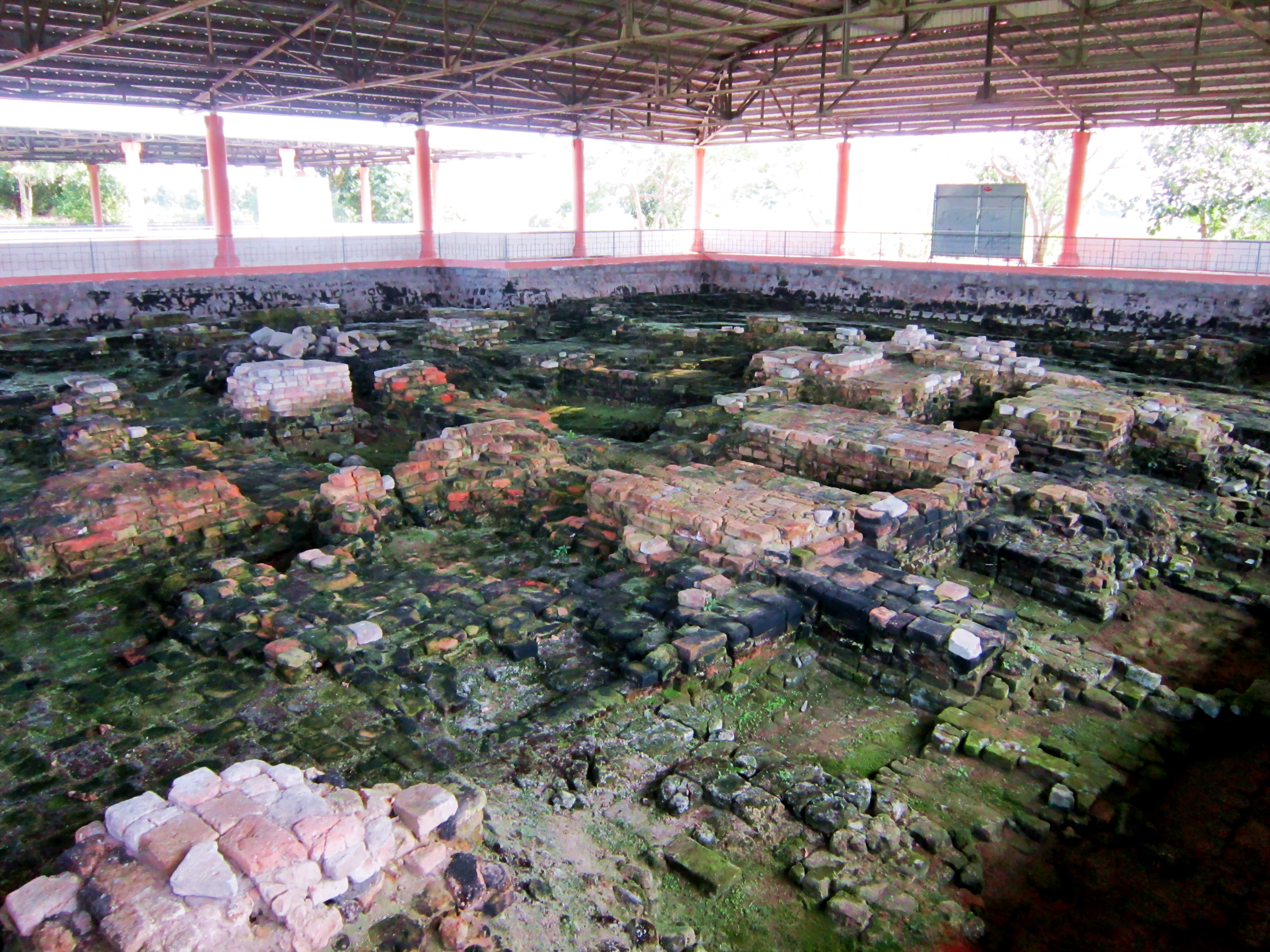
The archeological site of Gò Cây Thị, Ba Thê Óc Eo

Óc Eo has been regarded as belonging to the historical kingdom of Funan (扶南) that flourished in the Mekong Delta between the 2nd century BC and the 12th century CE. The kingdom of Funan is known to us from the works of ancient Chinese historians, especially writers of dynastic histories, who in turn drew from the testimony of Chinese diplomats and travellers, and of foreign (including Funanese) embassies to the Chinese imperial courts. Indeed, the name "Funan" itself is an artifact of the Chinese histories, and does not appear in the paleographic record of ancient Vietnam or Cambodia. From the Chinese sources, however, it can be determined that a polity called "Funan" by the Chinese was the dominant polity located in the Mekong Delta region. As a result, archeological discoveries in that region that can be dated to the period of Funan have been identified with the historical polity of Funan. The discoveries at Óc Eo and related sites are our primary source for the material culture of Funan.

The Vietnamese archaeologist and historian Hà Văn Tấn has written that at the present stage of knowledge, it was impossible to demonstrate the existence of a Funan culture, widely spread from the Mekong Delta through the Chao Praya delta to Burma, with Óc Eo as the typical representative: the presence of similar artefacts such as jewelry and seals from sites in those areas was simply the result of trade and exchange, while each of the sites bore the signs of their own separate cultural development. He supported the view of Claude Jacques that, in view of the complete lack of any Khmer records relating to a kingdom by the name of Funan, use of this name should be abandoned in favour of the names, such as Aninditapura, Bhavapura, Shresthapura and Vyadhapura, which are known from inscriptions to have been used at the time for cities in the region and provide a more accurate idea of the true geography of the ancient Khmer territory. Hà Văn Tấn argued that, from the late neolithic or early metal age, Óc Eo gradually emerged as an economic and cultural centre of the Mekong Delta and, with an important position on the Southeast Asian sea routes, became a meeting place for craftsmen and traders, which provided adequate conditions for urbanization, receiving foreign influences, notably from India, which in turn stimulated internal development.

Funan was part of the region of Southeast Asia referred to in ancient Indian texts as Suvarnabhumi, and may have been the part to which the term was first applied.

== Sources ==
- Albert Herrmann, "Der Magnus Sinus und Cattigara nach Ptolemaeus", Comptes Rendus du 15me Congrès International de Géographie, Amsterdam, 1938, Leiden, Brill, 1938, tome II, sect. IV, Géographie Historique et Histoire de la Géographie, pp. 123–8. English translation at
- Albert Herrmann, "South-Eastern Asia on Ptolemy’s Map", Research and Progress: Quarterly Review of German Science, vol.V, no.2, March–April 1939, pp. 121–127, p. 123.
- Albert Herrmann, Das Land der Seide und Tibet in Lichte der Antike, Leipzig, 1938, pp. 80, 84.
- Louis Malleret, L’Archéologie du delta du Mékong, Tome Troisiéme, La culture du Fu-nan, Paris, 1962, chap.XXV, "Oc-Èo et Kattigara", pp. 421–54.
- John Caverhill, "Some Attempts to ascertain the utmost Extent of the Knowledge of the Ancients in the East Indies", Philosophical Transactions, vol.57, 1767, pp. 155–174.
- Adhir K. Chakravarti, "Early Sino-Indian Maritime Trade and Fu-Nan", D.C. Sircar (ed.), Early Indian Trade and Industry, Calcutta, University of Calcutta Centre of Advanced Study in Ancient Indian History and Culture, Lectures and Seminars, no. VIII-A, part I, 1972, pp. 101–117.
- George Cœdès, "Fouilles en Cochinchine: Le Site de Go Oc Eo, Ancien Port du Royaume de Fou-nan", Artibus Asiae, vol.10, no.3, 1947, pp. 193–199.
- George Coedès, review of Paul Wheatley, The Golden Khersonese (Kuala Lumpur, 1961), in T'oung Pao 通報, vol.49, parts 4/5, 1962, pp. 433–439.
- George Coedès, "Some Problems in the Ancient History of the Hinduized States of South-East Asia", Journal of Southeast Asian History, vol.5, no.2, September 1964, pp. 1–14.
- Albrecht Dihle, "Serer und Chinesen", in Antike und Orient: Gesammelte Aufsätze, Heidelberg, Carl Winter, 1984, S.209.
- J.W. McCrindle, Ancient India as described by Ptolemy, London, Trubner, 1885, revised edition by Ramachandra Jain, New Delhi, Today & Tomorrow's Printers & Publishers, 1974, p. 204:
- George E. Nunn, ‘The Three Maplets attributed to Bartholomew Columbus’, Imago Mundi, 9 (1952), 12–22, page 15; and Helen Wallis, ‘What Columbus Knew’, History Today, 42 (May 1992), 17–23.
- Quoted in J.M. Cohen (ed.), The Four Voyages of Christopher Columbus, Harmondsworth, Penguin, 1969, p. 287.
- Ha Van Tan, "Oc Eo: Endogenous and Exogenous Elements", Viet Nam Social Sciences, 1-2 (7–8), 1986, pp. 91–101.
- R. Stein, "Le Lin-yi 林邑, sa localisation, sa contribution à la formation de Champa et ses liens avec la Chine", Han-Hiue 漢學, Bulletin du Centre d’Études sinologiques de Pékin, vol.II, pts.1-3, 1948, pp. 115, 122–3.
- R. Stein, review of Albert Herrmann, Das Land der Seide und Tibet im Lichte der Antike (Leipzig, 1938), in Bulletin de l’École Française d’ Extrême-Orient, tome XL, fasc.2, 1940, p. 459.
- Paul Lévy, "Le Kattigara de Ptolémée et les Étapes d’Agastya, le Héros de l’Expansion Hindoue en Extrême-Orient", in XXIe Congrès Internationale des Orientalistes, Paris, 1948, Actes, Paris, Société Asiatique de Paris, 1949, p. 223.
- Paul Demiéville, review of R. Stein, "Le Lin-yi 林邑", (Han-Hiue 漢學, vol.II, pts.1-3, 1948), in T'oung Pao 通報, vol.40, livres 4/5, 1951, pp. 336–351, n.b. pp. 338, 341.
- Paul Lévy, "Recent Archaeological Researches by the École Français d’Extrême Orient, French Indo-China, 1940–1945", in Kalidas Nag (ed.), Sir William Jones: Bicentenary of his Birth Commemoration Volume, 1746–1946, Calcutta, Royal Asiatic Society of Bengal, 1948, pp. 118–19; paraphrased in R. C. Majumdar, Ancient Indian colonisation in South-East Asia, Baroda, B.J. : Sandesara, 1963, pp. 12–13.
- Pierre-Yves Manguin, "The archaeology of Fu Nan in the Mekong River Delta: the Oc Eo culture of Viet Nam ", in Nancy Tingley and Andreas Reinecke, Arts of ancient Viet Nam: from River Plain to Open Sea, Houston, Museum of Fine Arts, 2009, pp. 100–118.
- Phạm Dức Mạnh, History of the South from the Original Advent of Civilization & Basic Material Relating to the Kingdom of Funan; Traditional Oc Eo Culture – Later Oc Eo (Research Material), Ho Chi Minh City, Ho Chi Minh City National University Faculty of Social Science & Literature, 2009.
- Paul Wheatley, prefatory essay in Albert Herrmann, An historical atlas of China, Edinburgh, Edinburgh University Press, 1966, p.xxviii.
- Srisakra Vallibotama and Dhida Saraya, "South-East Asia from ad 300 to 700: Oc-éo", in Sigfried J. de Laet, History of Humanity, London, New York and Paris, Routledge and Unesco, Volume III, 1996, Joachim Herrmann and Erik Zürcher (eds.), From the Seventh Century BC to the Seventh Century AD, pp. 428–29.
- John N. Miksic, Singapore & the Silk Road of the Sea, 1300-1800, Singapore, NUS Press, 2014, pp. 33–37, 45–56.
