= Cattigara =

Vietnamese port city described in antiquity

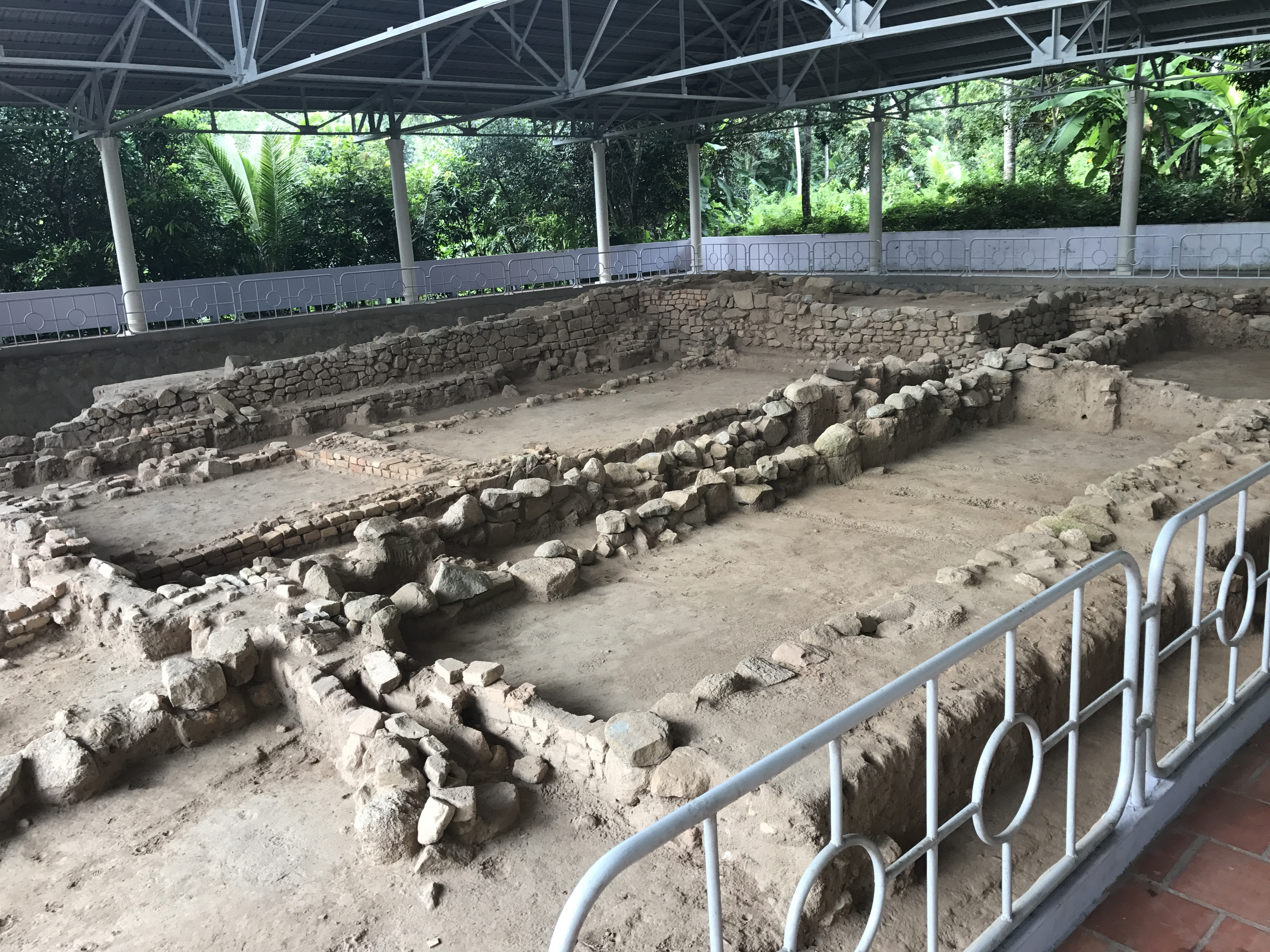
Funan-era ruins of Nam Linh Son, Óc Eo, Vietnam. Óc Eo has been identified multiple times by scholars as the location of Cattigara

Cattigara is the name of a major port city located on the Magnus Sinus described by various ancient sources. Some modern scholars have linked Cattigara to the archaeological site of Óc Eo in present-day Vietnam.

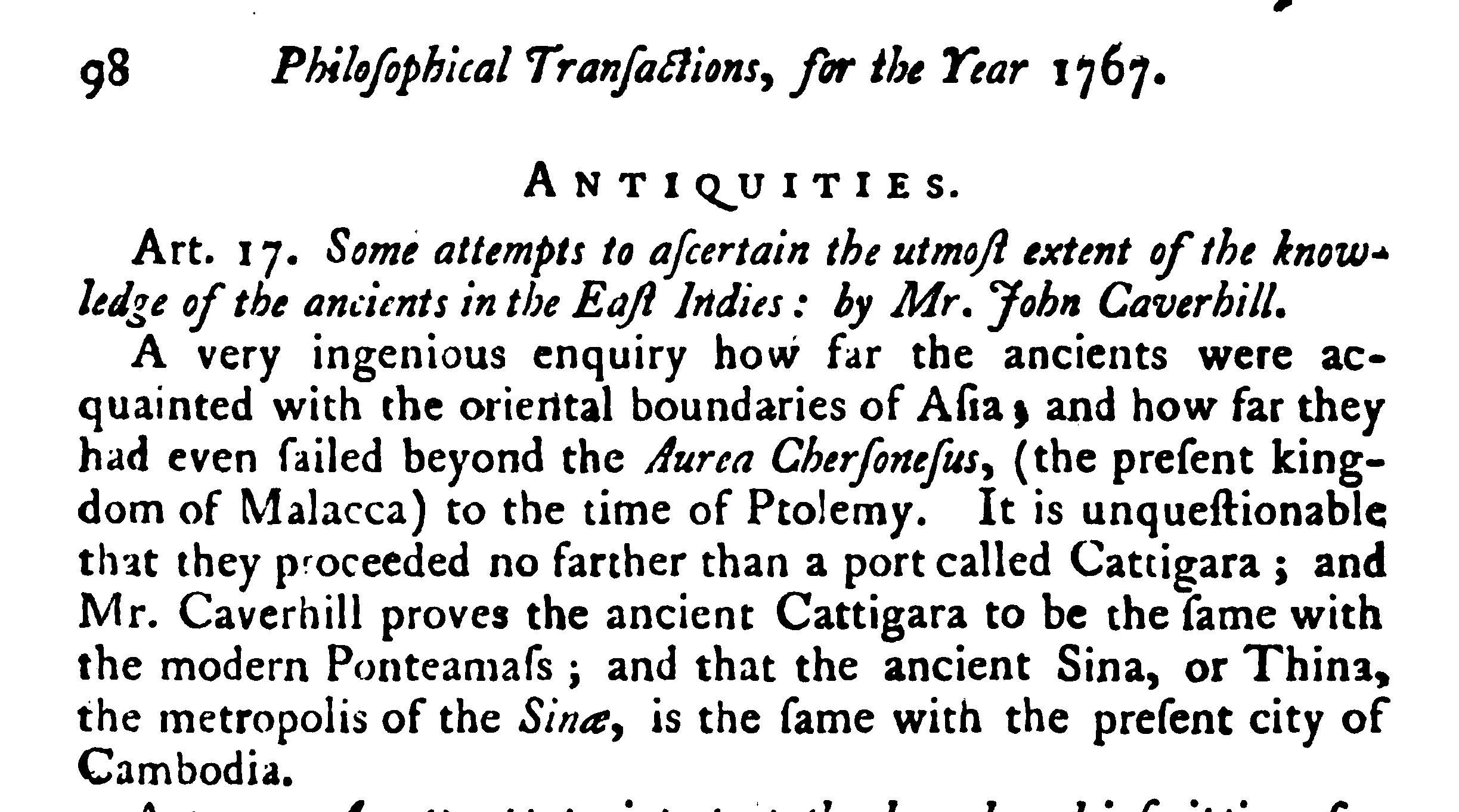
Mr Caverhill "proves" the ancient Cattigara to be the same with the modern Ponteamass (Banteaymeas), The Monthly Review, Or, Literary Journal, Volume 40, 1769, p.98.

== Ptolemy's and Marcian's description ==
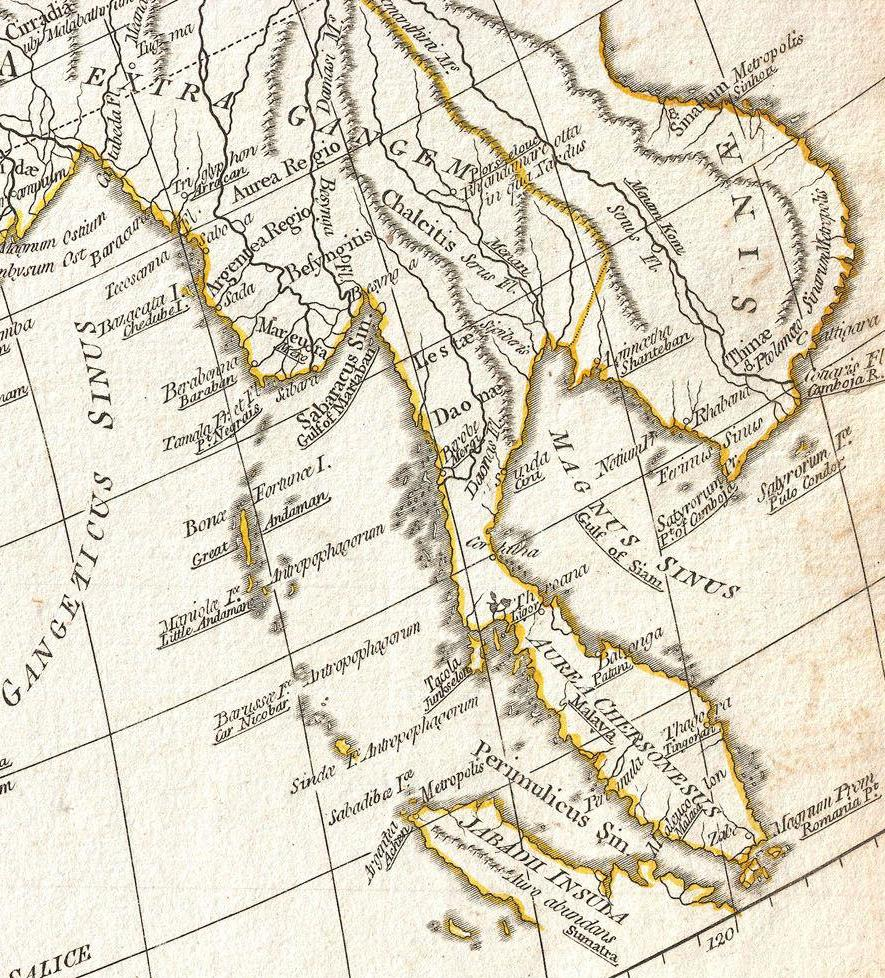
Cattigara located at the outlet of the river Mekong (Cotiaris), by d' Anville, Orbis Veteribus Notus (The World Known to the Ancients).

Cattigara or Kattigara (τὰ Καττίγαρα) was the name given by the 2nd-century Alexandrian geographer Claudius Ptolemy as a port of the Sinae on the easternmost shore of the Indian Sea at (due to a scribal error) 8½° south of the Equator. It is placed among the easternmost limits of the inhabited world, together with Sera and the regions of the Sinae.

The ancient Greek geographer Marcian of Heraclea also refers to Cattigara, describing it as the principal port of the Sinae and the furthest point of the known inhabited world in the southern regions.

The name "Cattigara" was probably derived from the Sanskrit Kirti-nagara कीर्ति- नगर "Renowned City" or Kotti-nagara कोटि-नगर "Strong City".

On some medieval maps, for example on the Martellus map of 1489 or the Waldseemüller map from 1507, published in the Ptolemy's Geography, Cattigara was located 8 and a half degrees below the equator and 178 degrees west of the Canary Islands.

== Columbus's search for Ciamba ==
Guided by Ptolemy, the discoverers of the New World were initially trying to find their way to Cattigara. On the 1489 map of the world made by Henricus Martellus Germanus, revising Ptolemy's work, Asia terminated in its southeastern point in a cape, the Cape of Cattigara. Writing of his 1499 voyage, Amerigo Vespucci said he had hoped to reach Malacca (Melaka) by sailing westward from Spain across the Western Ocean (the Atlantic) around the Cape of Cattigara into the Sinus Magnus ("Great Gulf") that lay to the east of the Golden Chersonese (Malay Peninsula), of which the Cape of Cattigara formed the southeastern point. The Sinus Magnus was the actual Gulf of Thailand.

Christopher Columbus, on his fourth and last voyage of 1502–1503, planned to follow the coast of Ciamba southward around the Cape of Cattigara and sail through the strait separating Cattigara from the New World, into the Sinus Magnus to Malacca. This was the route he thought Marco Polo had gone from China to India in 1292. Columbus planned to meet up with the expedition sent at the same time from Portugal around the Cape of Good Hope under Vasco da Gama, and carried letters of credence from the Spanish monarchs to present to da Gama. On reaching Cariay on the coast of Costa Rica, Columbus thought he was close to the gold mines of Ciamba. On 7 July 1503, he wrote from Jamaica: "I reached the land of Cariay...Here I received news of the gold mines of Ciamba which I was seeking".

It was eventually realized that Columbus had not reached Ciamba or any part of the Cape of Cattigara. The search for Cattigara continued during the early years of the sixteenth century. Johannes Schöner concluded after the circumnavigation of the world by the expedition led by Ferdinand Magellan that the Pacific Ocean was the Sinus Magnus and located Cattigara on the west coast of South America. In this he was followed by Oronce Fine and the makers of the Dieppe Maps but eventually geographers and cartographers had to admit that Cattigara could not be found. The mathematician and cosmographer Gemma Frisius said in 1531: "in the place where Ptolemy described Cattigara as projecting far beyond the Equator, and others by quite dubious reasoning as adjoining the kingdoms of Var, Moabar and other places now, following repeated voyages on both this side and the other of the Equator, no continental land was found but an almost infinite number of islands".

== Later studies ==
John Caverhill deduced in 1767 that Cattigara was the Mekong Delta port Banteaymeas (between modern-day Banteay Meas District and Hà Tiên), not far from Óc Eo. The plea in 1979 by Jeremy H.C.S. Davidson for "a thorough study of Hà-tiên in its historical context and in relation to Óc-eo" as indispensable for an accurate understanding and interpretation of the site, still remains unanswered.

The 18th-century French geographer, Jean-Baptiste Bourguignon d'Anville, located Cattigara at the mouth of the Mekong (Cottiaris) River, where it is shown on his map, Orbis Veteribus Notus (The World Known to the Ancients).

20th century scholarship has determined that Ptolemy's Cattigara was at 8½° north of the Equator and was the forerunner of Saigon as the main port and entrepot at the mouth of the Mekong.

The Swedish yachtsman and writer Björn Landström also concluded, from the sailing directions given by the ancient merchant and seafarer Alexander, that Cattigara lay at the mouth of the Mekong.

The Western "father of Early Southeast Asian history", George Coedès, stated: "By the middle of the 3rd century Fu-nan had already established relations with China and India, and it is doubtless on the west coast of the Gulf of Siam that the furthest point reached by Hellenistic navigators is to be found, that is the harbour of Kattigara mentioned by Ptolemy". A.H. Christie said in 1979 that "the presence of objects, however few in number, from the Roman Orient" added some weight to the conjecture that Óc Eo was the Ptolemaic Cattigara. The distinguished German classical scholar, Albrecht Dihle, supported this view, saying:

From the account of the voyage of Alexander referred to by Ptolemy, Kattigara can actually be located only in the Mekong delta, because Alexander went first along the east coast of the Malacca peninsula, northward to Bangkok, from thence likewise only along the coast toward the south east, and so came to Kattigara. We hear nothing of any further change of course. In addition, at Óc Eo, an emporium excavated in the western Mekong delta, in the ancient kingdom of Fu-nan, Roman finds from the 2nd century after Christ have come to light.

Adhir Chakravarti concluded: "The archaeological remains unearthed at Oc-Eo to the south of Phnom Bà Thên in the Trans-Bassac region of Cochin-China have proved beyond doubt that it was a great port of Fou-nan and, as suggested by Mallaret and Coedès may be identified with Ptolemy's Kattigara emporium (= Skt Kirtinagara or Kottanagara)".

The eminent scholar of ancient Indian civilization, Luciano Petech, concluded: "Kattigara was situated on the Mekong delta… At Go Óc Eo in western Cochinchina, along with Indian jewelry and Chinese bronze mirrors, several Roman objects were excavated: beads, gems, cammei, and, last but not least, Roman coins of the Antonines".

== See also ==
- Suvarnabhumi
- Funan
- Dragon's Tail (peninsula)
