= Algorism =

Mathematical technique for arithmetic

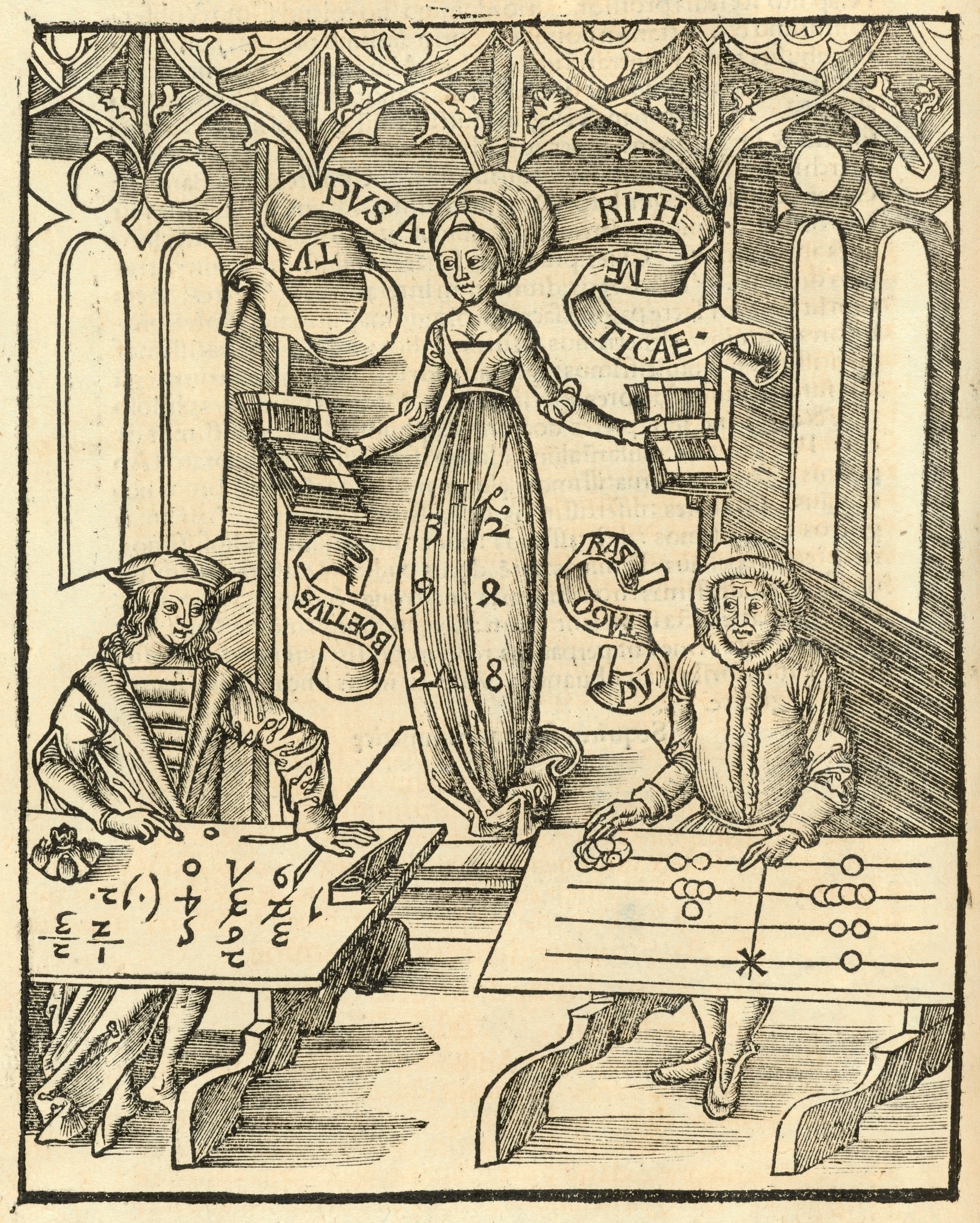
Calculating-Table by Gregor Reisch: Margarita Philosophica, 1503. The woodcut shows Arithmetica instructing an algorist and an abacist (inaccurately represented as Boethius and Pythagoras). There was keen competition between the two from the introduction of the Algebra into Europe in the 12th century until its triumph in the 16th.

Algorism is the technique of performing basic arithmetic by writing numbers in place value form and applying a set of memorized rules and facts to the digits. One who practices algorism is known as an algorist. This positional notation system has largely superseded earlier calculation systems that used a different set of symbols for each numerical magnitude, such as Roman numerals, and in some cases required a device such as an abacus.

== Etymology ==
The word algorism comes from the name Al-Khwārizmī (c. 780–850), a Persian mathematician, astronomer, geographer and scholar in the House of Wisdom in Baghdad, whose name means "the native of Khwarezm", which is now in modern-day Uzbekistan. He wrote a treatise in Arabic language in the 9th century, which was translated into Latin in the 12th century under the title Algoritmi de numero Indorum. This title means "Algoritmi on the numbers of the Indians", where "Algoritmi" was the translator's Latinization of Al-Khwarizmi's name. Al-Khwarizmi was the most widely read mathematician in Europe in the late Middle Ages, primarily through his other book, the Algebra. In late medieval Latin, algorismus, the corruption of his name, simply meant the "decimal number system" that is still the meaning of modern English algorism. During the 17th century, the French form for the word – but not its meaning – was changed to algorithm, following the model of the word logarithm, this form alluding to the ancient Greek arithmos = number. English adopted the French very soon afterwards, but it wasn't until the late 19th century that "algorithm" took on the meaning that it has in modern English. In English, it was first used about 1230 and then by Chaucer in 1391. Another early use of the word is from 1240, in a manual titled Carmen de Algorismo composed by Alexandre de Villedieu. It begins thus:

Haec algorismus ars praesens dicitur, in qua / Talibus Indorum fruimur bis quinque figuris.

which translates as:

This present art, in which we use those twice five Indian figures, is called algorismus.

The word algorithm also derives from algorism, a generalization of the meaning to any set of rules specifying a computational procedure. Occasionally algorism is also used in this generalized meaning, especially in older texts.

== History ==
Starting with the integer arithmetic developed in India using base 10 notation, Al-Khwārizmī along with other mathematicians in medieval Islam, documented new arithmetic methods and made many other contributions to decimal arithmetic (see the articles linked below). These included the concept of the decimal fractions as an extension of the notation, which in turn led to the notion of the decimal point. This system was popularized in Europe by Leonardo of Pisa, now known as Fibonacci.

== See also ==
- Algorithmic art
- Hindu–Arabic numeral system
- History of the Hindu–Arabic numeral system
- Johannes de Sacrobosco
- Mental calculation
- Positional notation
