= Yangzhou massacre (760) =

Tang Dynasty massacre of foreign merchants

- Location: Yangzhou
- Date: 760
- Target: Arabs and Persians
- Deaths: Thousands
- Perpetrator: Forces under Tian Shengong

In the Yangzhou massacre, Chinese forces under Tian Shengong killed thousands of foreign merchants in Yangzhou in 760 AD during the Tang dynasty.

Yangzhou, at the junction of the Yangtze River and the Grand Canal, was a center of commerce, finance and industry, and one of the wealthiest cities in Tang China, with a large population of foreign merchants.

In 760 CE, the Jiedu envoy of Huainan, Liu Zhan (劉展), started a mutiny with his brother Liu Yin. Their army initially defeated the army of the governor, Deng Jingshan (鄧景山), at Xucheng County (modern Sihong, Jiangsu), before crossing the Yangtze River and defeating Li Yao, who fled to Xuancheng. On the advice of famed general Guo Ziyi, Deng recruited a general from Pinglu, Tian Shengong (田神功), to suppress the revolt. Tian and his army landed at Jinshan on Hangzhou Bay, and despite initial losses he defeated Liu's army of 8000 elite soldiers at Guangling. Liu Zhan himself was shot through the eye with an arrow and beheaded.

Since Tian had previously fought for the An Shi Rebellion, he was interested in reingratiating himself with the Tang Emperor. He chose Yangzhou as the ideal target from which to loot gifts for the Emperor. When Tian's forces arrived, they robbed the inhabitants, killing thousands of Arab and Persian merchants. Tian then travelled to the Tang capital, Chang'an, and presented looted gold and silver to the emperor.

== See also ==
- Guangzhou massacre
- List of massacres in China
