= Al-Khwarizmi =

Islamic mathematician (c. 780 – c. 850)

Muḥammad ibn Mūsā al-Khwārizmī
- محمد بن موسى الخوارزميّ
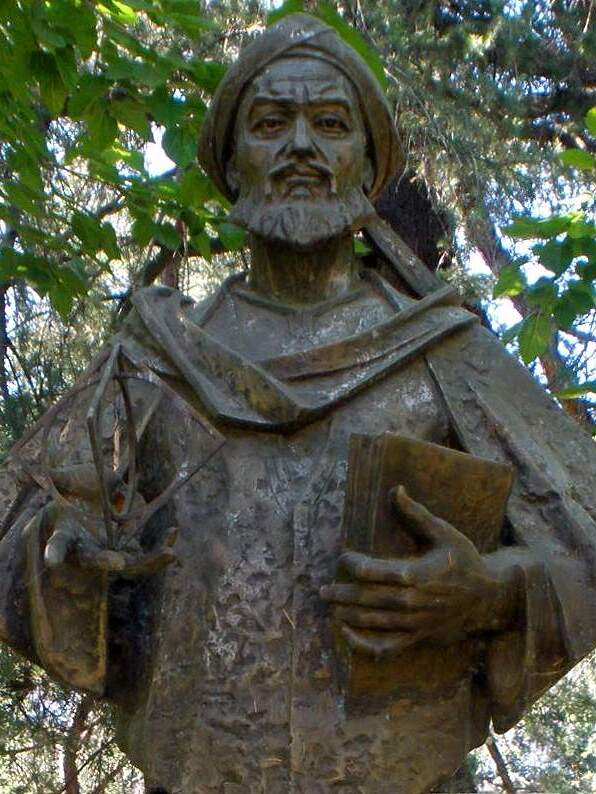
- Statue in Madrid, erected in 2020
- Born: c. 780; Khwarazm, Abbasid Caliphate
- Died: c. 850
- Occupation: House of Wisdom in Baghdad (appt. c. 820)

Academic work
- Era: Islamic Golden Age
- Main interests: Mathematics; astronomy; geography
- Notable works: Al-Jabr (820); Zij as-Sindhind (820); Kitab Surat al-Ard (833)
- Notable ideas: Treatises on algebra and the Hindu–Arabic numeral system
- Influenced: Abu Kamil of Egypt, Nicolo Tartaglia

Muhammad ibn Musa al-Khwarizmi, (Note: There is some confusion in the literature on whether al-Khwārizmī's full name is ابو عبدالله محمد بن موسى خوارزمی Abū ʿAbdallāh Muḥammad ibn Mūsā al-Khwārizmī or ابوجعفر محمد بن موسی خوارزمی Abū Ja'far Muḥammad ibn Mūsā al-Khwārizmī. Ibn Khaldun notes in his Prolegomena: "The first to write on this discipline [algebra] was Abu 'Abdallah al-Khuwarizmi. After him, there was Abu Kamil Shuja' b. Aslam. People followed in his steps." In the introduction to his critical commentary on Robert of Chester's Latin translation of al-Khwārizmī's Algebra, L. C. Karpinski notes that Abū Ja'far Muḥammad ibn Mūsā refers to the eldest of the Banū Mūsā brothers. Karpinski notes in his review on (Ruska 1917) that in (Ruska 1918): "Ruska here inadvertently speaks of the author as Abū Ga'far M. b. M., instead of Abū Abdallah M. b. M." Donald Knuth writes it as Abū 'Abd Allāh Muḥammad ibn Mūsā al-Khwārizmī and quotes it as meaning "literally, 'Father of Abdullah, Mohammed, son of Moses, native of Khwārizm,'" citing previous work by Heinz Zemanek.) or simply al-Khwarizmi (c. 780 – c. 850) was a mathematician active during the Islamic Golden Age, who produced Arabic-language works in mathematics, astronomy, and geography. Around 820, he worked at the House of Wisdom in Baghdad, the contemporary capital city of the Abbasid Caliphate. One of the most prominent scholars of the period, his works were widely influential on later authors, both in the Islamic world and Europe.

Few biographical details are known about al-Khwarizmi's life. His popularizing treatise on algebra, compiled between 813 and 833 as Al-Jabr (The Compendious Book on Calculation by Completion and Balancing), presented the first systematic solution of linear and quadratic equations. One of his achievements in algebra was his demonstration of how to solve quadratic equations by completing the square, for which he provided geometric justifications. Because al-Khwarizmi was the first person to treat algebra as an independent discipline and introduced the methods of "reduction" and "balancing" (the transposition of subtracted terms to the other side of an equation, that is, the cancellation of like terms on opposite sides of the equation), he has been described as the father or founder of algebra. The English term algebra comes from the short-hand title of his aforementioned treatise (الجبر Al-Jabr, transl. "completion" or "rejoining").

In the 12th century, Latin translations of al-Khwarizmi's textbook on Indian arithmetic (Algorithmo de Numero Indorum), which codified the various Indian numerals, introduced the decimal-based positional number system to the Western world. Likewise, Al-Jabr, translated into Latin by the English scholar Robert of Chester in 1145, was used until the 16th century as the principal mathematical textbook of European universities.

Al-Khwarizmi revised Geography, the 2nd-century Greek-language treatise by Ptolemy, listing the longitudes and latitudes of cities and localities. He further produced a set of astronomical tables and wrote about calendric works, as well as the astrolabe and the sundial. Al-Khwarizmi made important contributions to trigonometry, producing accurate sine and cosine tables.

Al-Khwarizmi's name was latinized as Algoritmi, making his name the origin of the word "algorithm".

== Life ==
Few details of al-Khwārizmī's life are known with certainty. Ibn al-Nadim gives his birthplace as Khwarazm, and he is generally thought to have come from this region. He was of Persian descent; his name means 'from Khwarazm', a region that was part of Greater Iran, and is now part of Turkmenistan and Uzbekistan. Despite being of non-Arabic origin (probably Khwārezmian), he wrote his scientific works entirely in Arabic.

Al-Tabari gives his name as Muḥammad ibn Musá al-Khwārizmī al-Majūsī al-Quṭrubbullī (محمد بن موسى الخوارزميّ المجوسـيّ القطربّـليّ). The epithet al-Qutrubbulli could indicate he might instead have come from Qutrubbul (Qatrabbul), near Baghdad. However, Roshdi Rashed denies this:

There is no need to be an expert on the period or a philologist to see that al-Tabari's second citation should read "Muhammad ibn Mūsa al-Khwārizmī and al-Majūsi al-Qutrubbulli," and that there are two people (al-Khwārizmī and al-Majūsi al-Qutrubbulli) between whom the letter wa [Arabic 'و' for the conjunction 'and'] has been omitted in an early copy. This would not be worth mentioning if a series of errors concerning the personality of al-Khwārizmī, occasionally even the origins of his knowledge, had not been made. Recently, G.J. Toomer ... with naive confidence constructed an entire fantasy on the error which cannot be denied the merit of amusing the reader.

On the other hand, David A. King affirms his nisba to Qutrubul, noting that he was called al-Khwārizmī al-Qutrubbulli because he was born just outside of Baghdad.

Regarding al-Khwārizmī's religion, Toomer writes:

Another epithet given to him by al-Ṭabarī, "al-Majūsī," would seem to indicate that he was an adherent of the old Zoroastrian religion. This would still have been possible at that time for a man of Iranian origin, but the pious preface to al-Khwārizmī's Algebra shows that he was an orthodox Muslim, so al-Ṭabarī's epithet could mean no more than that his forebears, and perhaps he in his youth, had been Zoroastrians.

Ibn al-Nadīm's Al-Fihrist includes a short biography on al-Khwārizmī together with a list of his books. Al-Khwārizmī accomplished most of his work between 813 and 833. After the Muslim conquest of Persia, Baghdad had become the centre of scientific studies and trade. Around 820 CE, he was appointed as the astronomer and head of the library of the House of Wisdom. The House of Wisdom was established by the Abbasid Caliph al-Ma'mūn. Al-Khwārizmī studied sciences and mathematics, including the translation of Greek and Sanskrit scientific manuscripts. He was also a historian who is cited by figures such as al-Tabari and Ibn Abi Tahir.

During the reign of al-Wathiq, he is said to have been involved in the first of two embassies to the Khazars. Douglas Morton Dunlop suggests that Muḥammad ibn Mūsā al-Khwārizmī might have been the same person as Muḥammad ibn Mūsā ibn Shākir, the eldest of the three Banū Mūsā brothers.

== Contributions ==
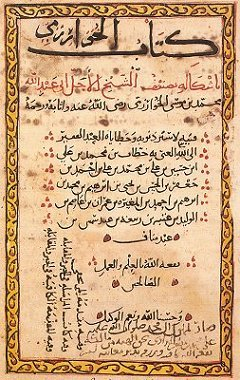
A page from al-Khwārizmī's Algebra

Al-Khwārizmī's contributions to mathematics, geography, astronomy, and cartography established the basis for innovation in algebra and trigonometry. His systematic approach to solving linear and quadratic equations led to algebra, a word derived from the title of his book on the subject, Al-Jabr.

On the Calculation with Hindu Numerals, written about 825, was principally responsible for spreading the Hindu–Arabic numeral system throughout the Middle East and Europe. When the work was translated into Latin in the 12th century as Algoritmi de numero Indorum (Al-Khwarizmi on the Hindu art of reckoning), the term "algorithm" was introduced to the Western world.

Some of his work was based on Persian and Babylonian astronomy, Indian numbers, and Greek mathematics.

Al-Khwārizmī systematized and corrected Ptolemy's data for Africa and the Middle East. Another major book was Kitab surat al-ard ("The Image of the Earth"; translated as Geography), presenting the coordinates of places based on those in the Geography of Ptolemy, but with improved values for the Mediterranean Sea, Asia, and Africa.

He wrote on mechanical devices like the astrolabe and sundial. He assisted a project to determine the circumference of the Earth and in making a world map for al-Ma'mun, the caliph, overseeing 70 geographers. When, in the 12th century, his works spread to Europe through Latin translations, it had a profound impact on the advance of mathematics in Europe.

Al-Khwarizmi's contributions to astronomy, which mixed theory and practice, were directly impactful upon astronomers of his epoch and the field as a whole. His meticulous methodological approach and scientific developments in this field directly influenced modern astronomy: "Al-Khwarizmi's astronomical tables, known as Zij, became essential tools for subsequent generations of astronomers. These tables enabled precise calculations for predicting astronomical events, such as eclipses and the positions of celestial bodies, which were crucial for navigation and timekeeping."

=== Algebra ===
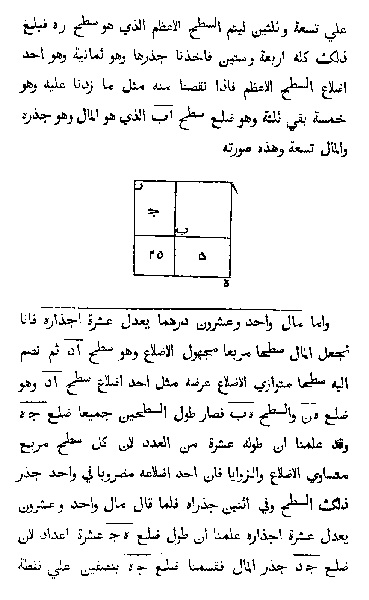
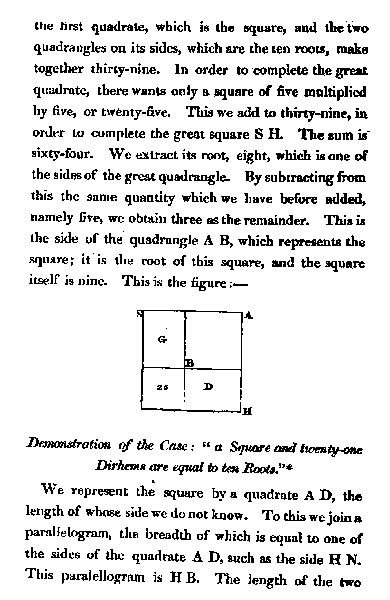
Left: The original Arabic print manuscript of the Book of Algebra by Al-Khwārizmī. Right: A page from The Algebra of Al-Khwarizmi by Fredrick Rosen, in English.

Al-Jabr (The Compendious Book on Calculation by Completion and Balancing, Arabic: الكتاب المختصر في حساب الجبر والمقابلة al-Kitāb al-mukhtaṣar fī ḥisāb al-jabr wal-muqābala) is a mathematical book written approximately 820 CE. It was written with the encouragement of Caliph al-Ma'mun as a popular work on calculation and is replete with examples and applications to a range of problems in trade, surveying and legal inheritance. The term "algebra" is derived from the name of one of the basic operations with equations (al-jabr, meaning "restoration", referring to adding a number to both sides of the equation to consolidate or cancel terms) described in this book. The book was translated in Latin as Liber algebrae et almucabala by Robert of Chester (Segovia, 1145) hence "algebra", and by Gerard of Cremona. A unique Arabic copy is kept at Oxford and was translated in 1831 by F. Rosen. A Latin translation is kept in Cambridge.

It provided an exhaustive account of solving polynomial equations up to the second degree, and discussed the fundamental method of "reduction" and "balancing", referring to the transposition of terms to the other side of an equation, that is, the cancellation of like terms on opposite sides of the equation.

Al-Khwārizmī's method of solving linear and quadratic equations worked by first reducing the equation to one of six standard forms (where b and c are positive integers)

- squares equal roots (ax^{2} = bx)
- squares equal number (ax^{2} = c)
- roots equal number (bx = c)
- squares and roots equal number (ax^{2} + bx = c)
- squares and number equal roots (ax^{2} + c = bx)
- roots and number equal squares (bx + c = ax^{2})

by dividing out the coefficient of the square and using the two operations al-jabr (Arabic: الجبر "restoring" or "completion") and al-muqābala ("balancing"). Al-jabr is the process of removing negative units, roots and squares from the equation by adding the same quantity to each side. For example, x^{2} = 40x − 4x^{2} is reduced to 5x^{2} = 40x. Al-muqābala is the process of bringing quantities of the same type to the same side of the equation. For example, x^{2} + 14 = x + 5 is reduced to x^{2} + 9 = x.

The above discussion uses modern mathematical notation for the types of problems that the book discusses. However, in al-Khwārizmī's day, most of this notation had not yet been invented, so he had to use ordinary text to present problems and their solutions. For example, for one problem he writes, (from the 1831 "Rosen" translation)

If some one say: “You divide ten into two parts: multiply the one by itself; it will be equal to the other taken eighty-one times.” Computation: You say, ten less thing, multiplied by itself, is a hundred plus a square less twenty things, and this is equal to eighty-one things. Separate the twenty things from a hundred and a square, and add them to eighty-one. It will then be a hundred plus a square, which is equal to a hundred and one roots. Halve the roots; the moiety is fifty and a half. Multiply this by itself, it is two thousand five hundred and fifty and a quarter. Subtract from this one hundred; the remainder is two thousand four hundred and fifty and a quarter. Extract the root from this; it is forty-nine and a half. Subtract this from the moiety of the roots, which is fifty and a half. There remains one, and this is one of the two parts.

— Al-Khwārizmī, Al-Khwārizmī 1831, pp. 47–48

In modern notation this process, with x the "thing" (شيء shayʾ) or "root", is given by the steps,

$$(10-x)^2=81 x$$
$$100 + x^2 - 20 x = 81 x$$
$$x^2+100=101 x$$

Let the roots of the equation be x = p and x = q. Then $\tfrac{p+q}{2}=50\tfrac{1}{2}$, $pq =100$ and

$$\frac{p-q}{2} = \sqrt{\left(\frac{p+q}{2}\right)^2 - pq}=\sqrt{2550\tfrac{1}{4} - 100}=49\tfrac{1}{2}$$

So a root is given by

$$x=50\tfrac{1}{2}-49\tfrac{1}{2}=1$$

Several authors have published texts under the name of Kitāb al-jabr wal-muqābala, including Abū Ḥanīfa Dīnawarī, Abū Kāmil, Abū Muḥammad al-'Adlī, Abū Yūsuf al-Miṣṣīṣī, 'Abd al-Hamīd ibn Turk, Sind ibn 'Alī, Sahl ibn Bišr, and Sharaf al-Dīn al-Ṭūsī.

Solomon Gandz has described Al-Khwarizmi as the father of Algebra:

Al-Khwarizmi's algebra is regarded as the foundation and cornerstone of the sciences. In a sense, al-Khwarizmi is more entitled to be called "the father of algebra" than Diophantus because al-Khwarizmi is the first to teach algebra in an elementary form and for its own sake, Diophantus is primarily concerned with the theory of numbers.

Victor J. Katz adds :

The first true algebra text which is still extant is the work on al-jabr and al-muqabala by Mohammad ibn Musa al-Khwarizmi, written in Baghdad around 825.

John J. O'Connor and Edmund F. Robertson wrote in the MacTutor History of Mathematics Archive:

Perhaps one of the most significant advances made by Arabic mathematics began at this time with the work of al-Khwarizmi, namely the beginnings of algebra. It is important to understand just how significant this new idea was. It was a revolutionary move away from the Greek concept of mathematics which was essentially geometry. Algebra was a unifying theory which allowed rational numbers, irrational numbers, geometrical magnitudes, etc., to all be treated as "algebraic objects". It gave mathematics a whole new development path so much broader in concept to that which had existed before, and provided a vehicle for future development of the subject. Another important aspect of the introduction of algebraic ideas was that it allowed mathematics to be applied to itself in a way which had not happened before.

Roshdi Rashed and Angela Armstrong write:

Al-Khwarizmi's text can be seen to be distinct not only from the Babylonian tablets, but also from Diophantus' Arithmetica. It no longer concerns a series of problems to be solved, but an exposition which starts with primitive terms in which the combinations must give all possible prototypes for equations, which henceforward explicitly constitute the true object of study. On the other hand, the idea of an equation for its own sake appears from the beginning and, one could say, in a generic manner, insofar as it does not simply emerge in the course of solving a problem, but is specifically called on to define an infinite class of problems.

According to Swiss-American historian of mathematics, Florian Cajori, Al-Khwarizmi's algebra was different from the work of Indian mathematicians, for Indians had no rules like the restoration and reduction. Regarding the dissimilarity and significance of Al-Khwarizmi's algebraic work from that of Indian Mathematician Brahmagupta, Carl B. Boyer wrote:

It is true that in two respects the work of al-Khowarizmi represented a retrogression from that of Diophantus. First, it is on a far more elementary level than that found in the Diophantine problems and, second, the algebra of al-Khowarizmi is thoroughly rhetorical, with none of the syncopation found in the Greek Arithmetica or in Brahmagupta's work. Even numbers were written out in words rather than symbols! It is quite unlikely that al-Khwarizmi knew of the work of Diophantus, but he must have been familiar with at least the astronomical and computational portions of Brahmagupta; yet neither al-Khwarizmi nor other Arabic scholars made use of syncopation or of negative numbers. Nevertheless, the Al-jabr comes closer to the elementary algebra of today than the works of either Diophantus or Brahmagupta, because the book is not concerned with difficult problems in indeterminant analysis but with a straight forward and elementary exposition of the solution of equations, especially that of second degree. The Arabs in general loved a good clear argument from premise to conclusion, as well as systematic organization – respects in which neither Diophantus nor the Hindus excelled.

=== Arithmetic ===
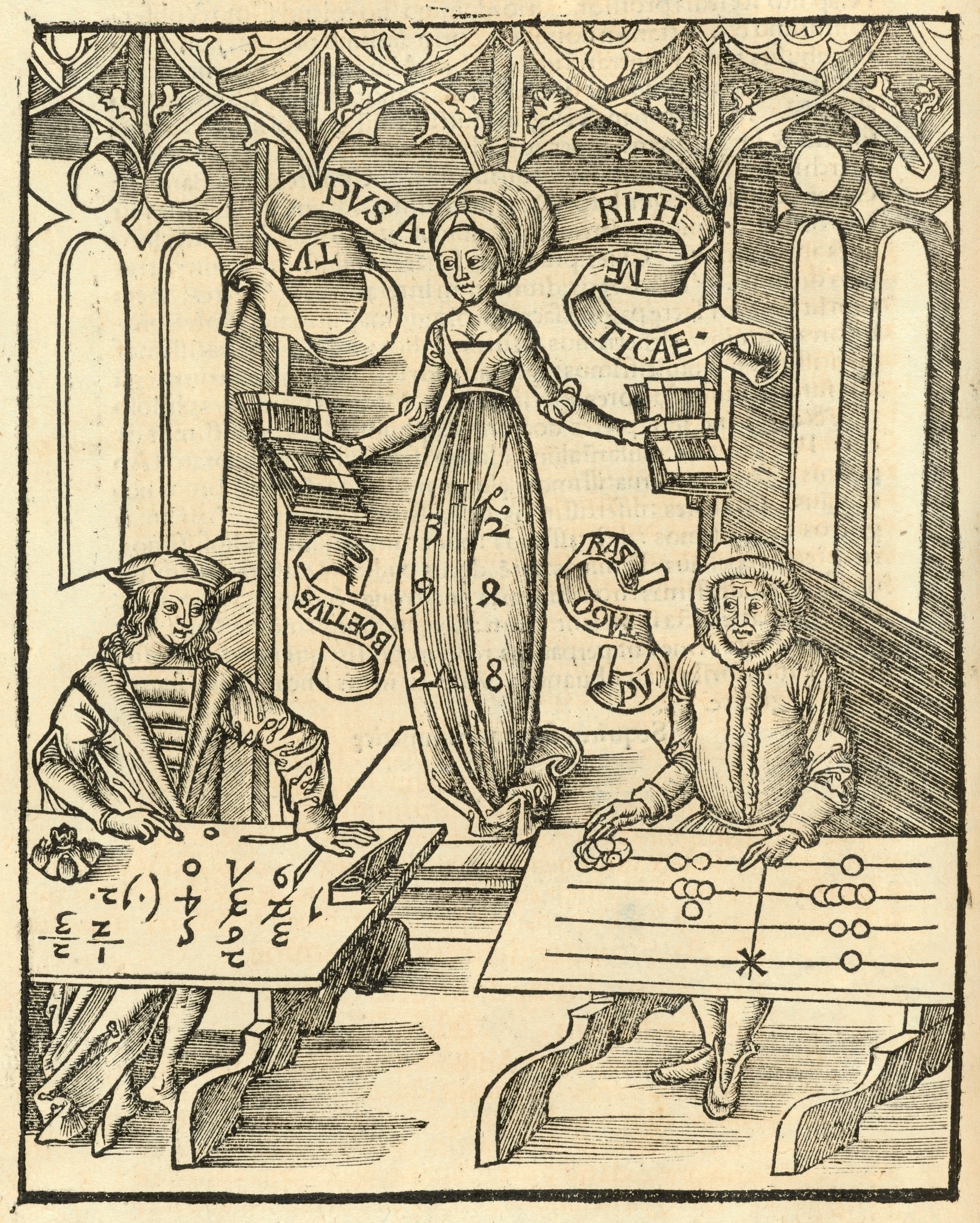
Algorists vs. abacists, depicted in an etching from 1503 CE

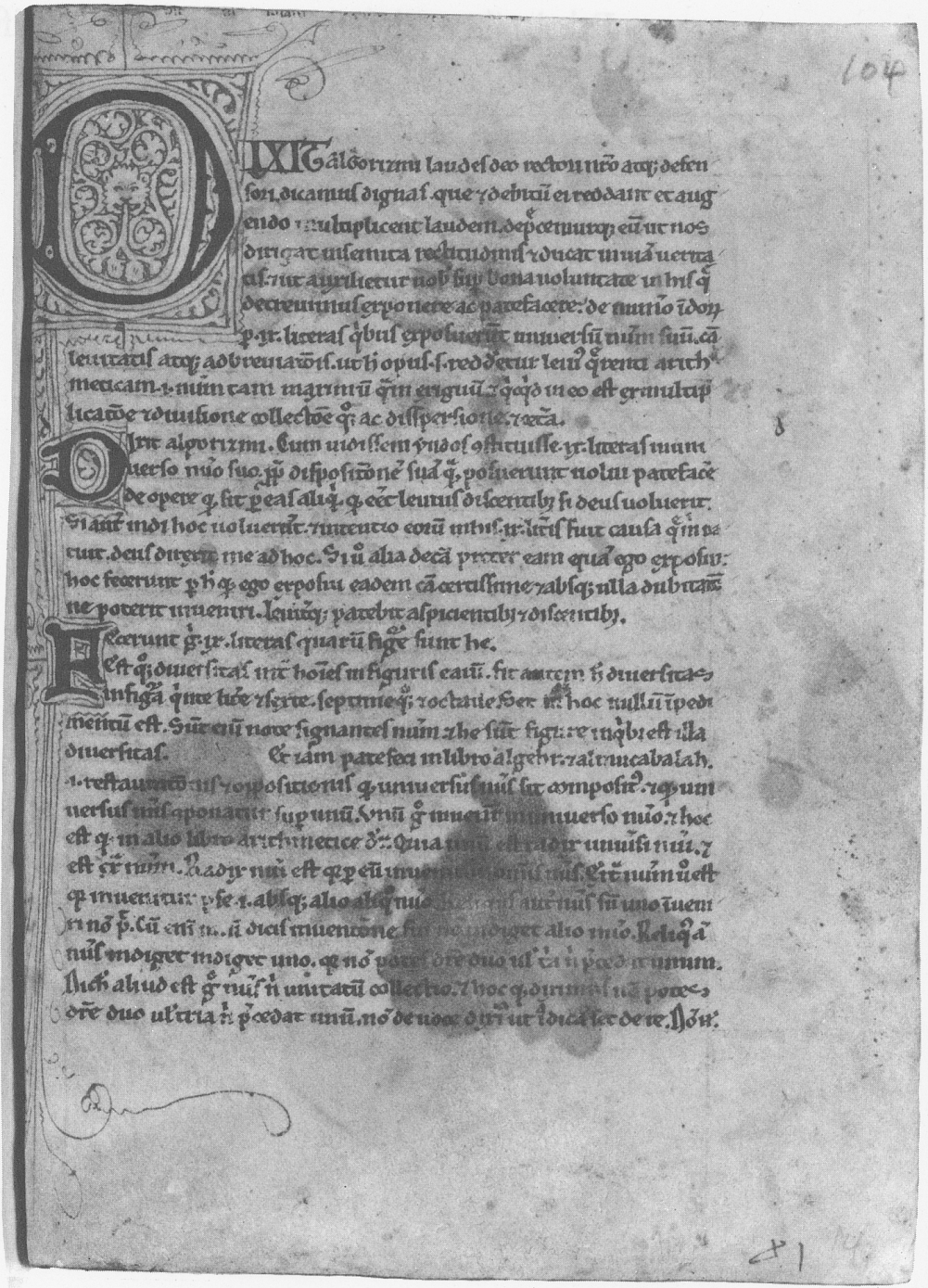
Page from a Latin translation, beginning with "Dixit algorizmi"

Al-Khwārizmī's second most influential work was on the subject of arithmetic, which survived in Latin translations but is lost in the original Arabic. His writings include the text kitāb al-ḥisāb al-hindī ('Book of Indian computation' (Note: Some scholars translate the title al-ḥisāb al-hindī as "computation with Hindu numerals", but Arabic Hindī means 'Indian' rather than 'Hindu'. A. S. Saidan states that it should be understood as arithmetic done "in the Indian way", with Hindu-Arabic numerals, rather than as simply "Indian arithmetic". The Arab mathematicians incorporated their own innovations in their texts.)), and perhaps a more elementary text, kitab al-jam' wa'l-tafriq al-ḥisāb al-hindī ('Addition and subtraction in Indian arithmetic'). These texts described algorithms on decimal numbers (Hindu–Arabic numerals) that could be carried out on a dust board. Called takht in Arabic (Latin: tabula), a board covered with a thin layer of dust or sand was employed for calculations, on which figures could be written with a stylus and easily erased and replaced when necessary. Al-Khwarizmi's algorithms were used for almost three centuries, until replaced by Al-Uqlidisi's algorithms that could be carried out with pen and paper.

As part of 12th century wave of Arabic science flowing into Europe via translations, these texts proved to be revolutionary in Europe. Al-Khwarizmi's Latinized name, Algorismus, turned into the name of method used for computations, and survives in the term "algorithm". It gradually replaced the previous abacus-based methods used in Europe.

Four Latin texts providing adaptions of Al-Khwarizmi's methods have survived, even though none of them is believed to be a literal translation:

- Dixit Algorizmi (published in 1857 under the title Algoritmi de Numero Indorum)
- Liber Alchoarismi de Practica Arismetice
- Liber Ysagogarum Alchorismi
- Liber Pulveris

Dixit Algorizmi ('Thus spake Al-Khwarizmi') is the starting phrase of a manuscript in the University of Cambridge library, which is generally referred to by its 1857 title Algoritmi de Numero Indorum. It is attributed to the Adelard of Bath, who had translated the astronomical tables in 1126. It is perhaps the closest to Al-Khwarizmi's own writings.

Al-Khwarizmi's work on arithmetic was responsible for introducing the Arabic numerals, based on the Hindu–Arabic numeral system developed in Indian mathematics, to the Western world. The term "algorithm" is derived from the algorism, the technique of performing arithmetic with Hindu-Arabic numerals developed by al-Khwārizmī. Both "algorithm" and "algorism" are derived from the Latinized forms of al-Khwārizmī's name, Algoritmi and Algorismi, respectively.

=== Astronomy ===
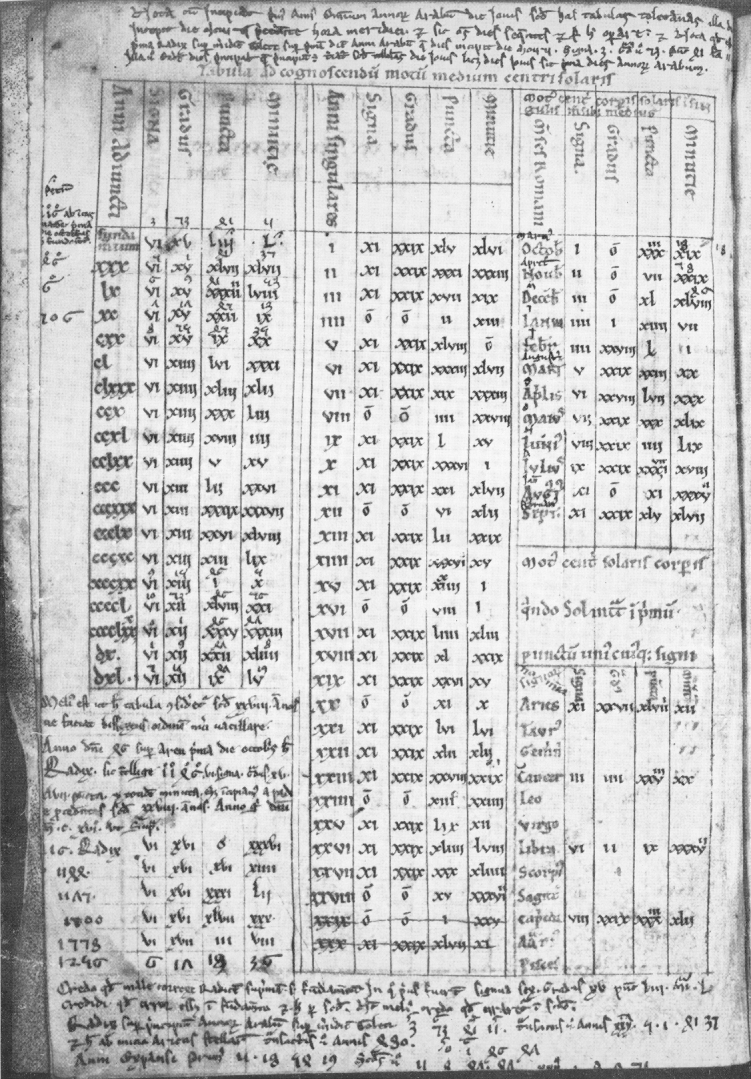
Page from Corpus Christi College MS 283, a Latin translation of al-Khwārizmī's Zīj

Al-Khwārizmī's Zīj as-Sindhind (Arabic: زيج السند هند, "astronomical tables of Siddhanta") is a work consisting of approximately 37 chapters on calendrical and astronomical calculations and 116 tables with calendrical, astronomical and astrological data, as well as a table of sine values. This is the first of many Arabic Zijes based on the Indian astronomical methods known as the sindhind. The word Sindhind is a corruption of the Sanskrit Siddhānta, which is the usual designation of an astronomical textbook. In fact, the mean motions in the tables of al-Khwarizmi are derived from those in the "corrected Brahmasiddhanta" (Brahmasphutasiddhanta) of Brahmagupta.

The work contains tables for the movements of the Sun, Moon and the five planets known at the time. This work marked the turning point in Islamic astronomy. Hitherto, Muslim astronomers had adopted a primarily research approach to the field, translating works of others and learning already discovered knowledge.

The original Arabic version (written c. 820) is lost, but a version by the Spanish astronomer Maslama al-Majriti (c. 1000) has survived in a Latin translation, presumably by Adelard of Bath (26 January 1126). The four surviving manuscripts of the Latin translation are kept at the Bibliothèque publique (Chartres), the Bibliothèque Mazarine (Paris), the Biblioteca Nacional (Madrid) and the Bodleian Library (Oxford).

Al-Khwarizmi's contributions to astronomy were both practical and theoretical, impacting the ways that astrolonomical phenomena were understood and applied during his epoch. His meticulous methodological approach and scientific developments in this field directly influenced modern astronomy: "Al-Khwarizmi's astronomical tables, known as Zij, became essential tools for subsequent generations of astronomers. These tables enabled precise calculations for predicting astronomical events, such as eclipses and the positions of celestial bodies, which were crucial for navigation and timekeeping."

=== Trigonometry ===
Al-Khwārizmī's Zīj as-Sindhind contained tables for the trigonometric functions of sines and cosine. A related treatise on spherical trigonometry is attributed to him.

Al-Khwārizmī produced accurate sine and cosine tables.

=== Geography ===
Gianluca Gorni's reconstruction of the section of al-Khwārizmī's world map concerning the Indian Ocean. The majority of the placenames used by al-Khwārizmī match those of Ptolemy, Martellus and Behaim. The general shape of the coastline is the same between Taprobane and Cattigara. The Dragon's Tail, or the eastern opening of the Indian Ocean, which does not exist in Ptolemy's description, is traced in very little detail on al-Khwārizmī's map, although is clear and precise on the Martellus map and on the later Behaim version.

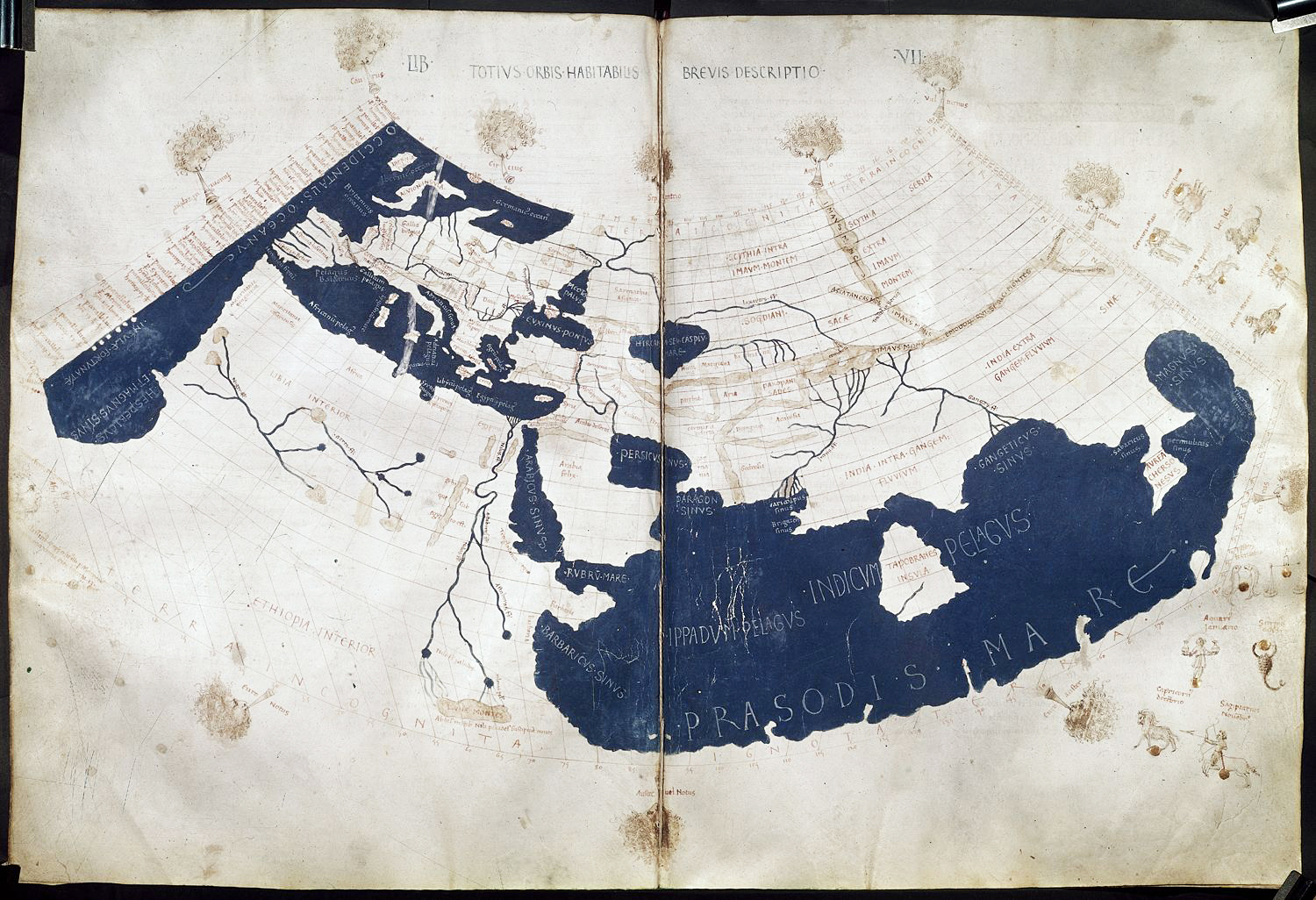
A 15th-century version of Ptolemy's Geography for comparison

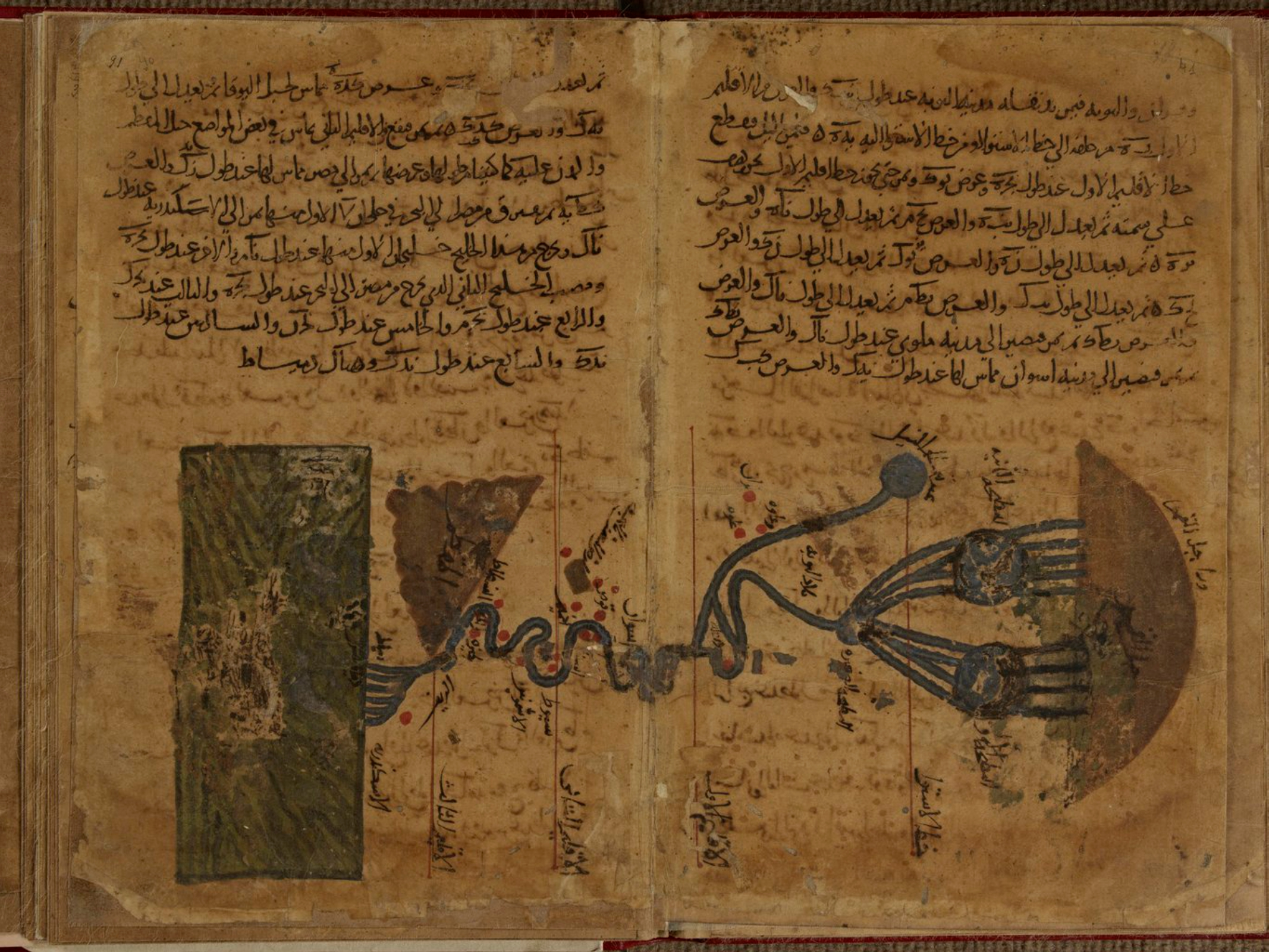
Earliest extant map of the Nile, in Al-Khwārazmī’s Kitāb ṣūrat al- arḍ.

Al-Khwārizmī's third major work is his Kitāb Ṣūrat al-Arḍ (Arabic: كتاب صورة الأرض, "Book of the Description of the Earth"), (Note: The full title is "The Book of the Description of the Earth, with its Cities, Mountains, Seas, All the Islands and the Rivers, written by Abu Ja'far Muhammad ibn Musa al-Khwārizmī, according to the Geographical Treatise written by Ptolemy the Claudian", although due to ambiguity in the word surah it could also be understood as meaning "The Book of the Image of the Earth" or even "The Book of the Map of the World".) also known as his Geography, which was finished in 833. It is a major reworking of Ptolemy's second-century Geography, consisting of a list of 2402 coordinates of cities and other geographical features following a general introduction.

There is one surviving copy of Kitāb Ṣūrat al-Arḍ, which is kept at the Strasbourg University Library. A Latin translation is at the Biblioteca Nacional de España in Madrid. The book opens with the list of latitudes and longitudes, in order of "weather zones", that is to say in blocks of latitudes and, in each weather zone, by order of longitude. As Paul Gallez notes, this system allows the deduction of many latitudes and longitudes where the only extant document is in such a bad condition, as to make it practically illegible. Neither the Arabic copy nor the Latin translation include the map of the world; however, Hubert Daunicht was able to reconstruct the missing map from the list of coordinates. Daunicht read the latitudes and longitudes of the coastal points in the manuscript, or deduced them from the context where they were not legible. He transferred the points onto graph paper and connected them with straight lines, obtaining an approximation of the coastline as it was on the original map. He did the same for the rivers and towns.

Al-Khwārizmī corrected Ptolemy's gross overestimate for the length of the Mediterranean Sea from the Canary Islands to the eastern shores of the Mediterranean; Ptolemy overestimated it at 63 degrees of longitude, while al-Khwārizmī almost correctly estimated it at nearly 50 degrees of longitude. He "depicted the Atlantic and Indian Oceans as open bodies of water, not land-locked seas as Ptolemy had done." Al-Khwārizmī's prime meridian at the Fortunate Isles was thus around 10° east of the line used by Marinus and Ptolemy. Most medieval Muslim gazetteers continued to use al-Khwārizmī's prime meridian.

=== Jewish calendar ===
Al-Khwārizmī wrote several other works including a treatise on the Hebrew calendar, titled Risāla fi istikhrāj ta'rīkh al-yahūd (Arabic: رسالة في إستخراج تأريخ اليهود, "Extraction of the Jewish Era"). It describes the Metonic cycle, a 19-year intercalation cycle; the rules for determining on what day of the week the first day of the month Tishrei shall fall; calculates the interval between the Anno Mundi or Jewish year and the Seleucid era; and gives rules for determining the mean longitude of the sun and the moon using the Hebrew calendar. Similar material is found in the works of Al-Bīrūnī and Maimonides.

=== Other works ===
Ibn al-Nadim's Al-Fihrist, an index of Arabic books, mentions al-Khwārizmī's Kitāb al-Taʾrīkh (Arabic: كتاب التأريخ), a book of annals. No direct manuscript survives; however, a copy had reached Nusaybin by the 11th century, where its metropolitan bishop, Mar Elias bar Shinaya, found it. Elias's chronicle quotes it from "the death of the Prophet" through to 169 AH, at which point Elias's text itself hits a lacuna.

Several Arabic manuscripts in Berlin, Istanbul, Tashkent, Cairo and Paris contain further material that surely or with some probability comes from al-Khwārizmī. The Istanbul manuscript contains a paper on sundials; the Fihrist credits al-Khwārizmī with Kitāb ar-Rukhāma(t) (Arabic: كتاب الرخامة). Other papers, such as one on the determination of the direction of Mecca, are on the spherical astronomy.

Two texts deserve special interest on the morning width (Ma'rifat sa'at al-mashriq fī kull balad) and the determination of the azimuth from a height (Ma'rifat al-samt min qibal al-irtifā'). He wrote two books on using and constructing astrolabes.

== Honours ==
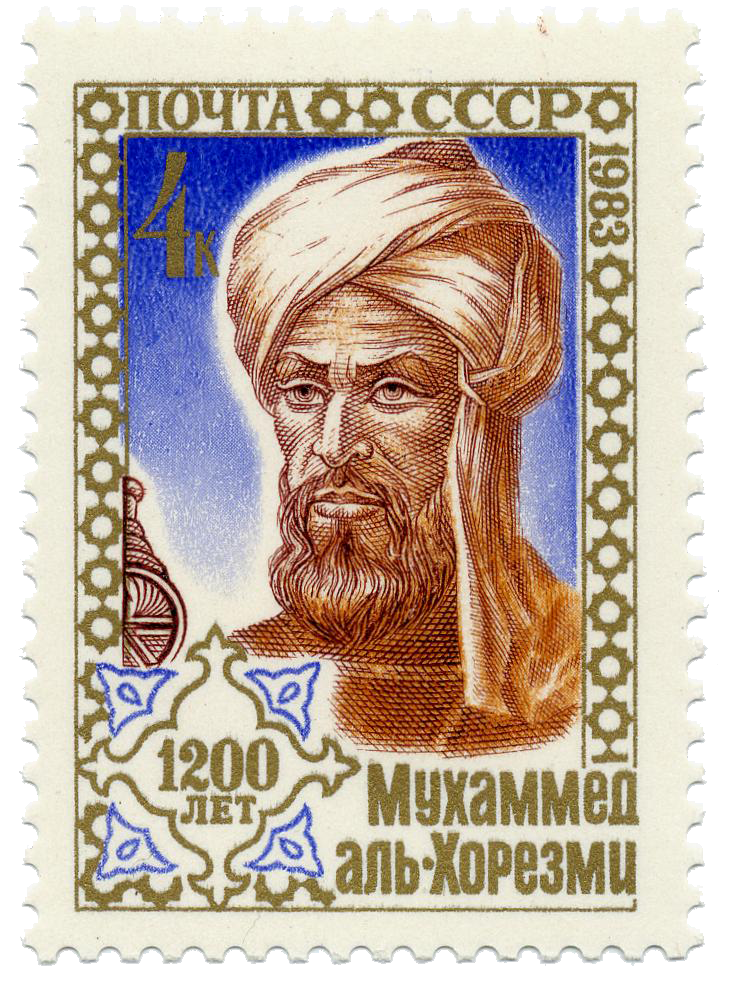
A Soviet postage stamp issued 6 September 1983, commemorating al-Khwārizmī's (approximate) 1200th birthday

- Al-Khwarizmi (crater) — A crater on the far side of the Moon.
- 13498 Al Chwarizmi — Main-belt Asteroid, Discovered 1986 Aug 6 by E. W. Elst and V. G. Ivanova at Smolyan.
- 11156 Al-Khwarismi — Main-belt Asteroid, Discovered 1997 Dec 31 by P. G. Comba at Prescott.
