= Thinae =

Names, routes and locations in connection with Thinae, shown according to the account in the Periplus of the Erythraean Sea (1st-century AD)

Thinae (Greek: Θῖναι, or Σῖναι), or Thina (Θῖνα), was a capital city of the Sinae (modern China), who carried on there a large commerce in silk and woollen stuffs.

== History ==
There appears to have been an ancient tradition that the city was surrounded with brazen walls; but Ptolemy remarks that these did not exist there, nor anything else worthy of remark. The ancient writers vary considerably as to its situation. According to the most probable accounts it was either Nanjing, or rather perhaps Thsin, Tin, or Tein, in the province of Shaanxi, where, according to the accounts of the Chinese themselves, the first kingdom of Sin, or China, was founded.

== See also ==
- Sino-Roman relations
- Names of China
- Silk Road
- Tenduc
- Luoyang

== Sources ==
- Dyer, Thomas H. (1857). "Thinae". In Smith, William (ed.). Dictionary of Greek and Roman Geography. Vol. 2: Iabadius–Zymethus. London: Walton and Maberly. p. 1174.
- Karttunen, Klaus (2006). "Sinae". In Salazar, Christine F. (ed.). Brill's New Pauly. Brill Publishers. Retrieved 16 May 2022.
- Ritter, Carl (1833). Die Erdkunde im Verhältniß zur Natur und zur Geschichte des Menschen, oder allgemeine vergleichende Geographie, als sichere Grundlage des Studiums und Unterrichts in physicalischen und historischen Wissenschaften. Band 2: Der Nord-Osten und der Süden von Hoch-Asien. Berlin: G. Reimer. p. 199. [Boston: De Gruyter, 2018].
- Schoff, Wilfred H. (1912). The Periplus of the Erythraean Sea: Travel and Trade in the Indian Ocean by a Merchant of the First Century. London, Bombay and Calcutta: Longmans, Green, and Co. p. 48.
