= Phryni =

Ancient people of eastern Central Asia

The Phryni (Ancient Greek: Φρύνοι) were an ancient people of eastern Central Asia, probably located in the eastern part of the Tarim Basin, in an area connected to that of the Seres and the Tocharians.

They are mentioned several times in Classical sources.

Strabo, speaking of the Greco-Bactrian kingdom explains that "they extended their empire even as far as the Seres and the Phryni".

Later, Pliny the Elder includes the Phryni (whom he names "Phruri") in his description of the people of the Far East:

...After leaving these, we again come to a nation of the Scythians, and then again to desert tracts tenanted by wild beasts, until we reach a chain of mountains which runs up to the sea, and bears the name of Tabis (ie. Tibet). It is not, however, before we have traversed very nearly one half of the coast that looks towards the north-east, that we find it occupied by inhabitants. The first people that are known of here are the Seres, so famous for the wool that is found in their forests (...) and the nation of the Attacori on the gulf of that name, a people protected by their sunny hills from all noxious blasts (...) After the Attacori, we find the nations of the Phruri and the Tochari, and, in the interior, the Casiri, a people of India, who look toward the Scythians, and feed on human flesh.
