= Serica =

One of the easternmost countries of Asia known to the ancient Greeks and Romans

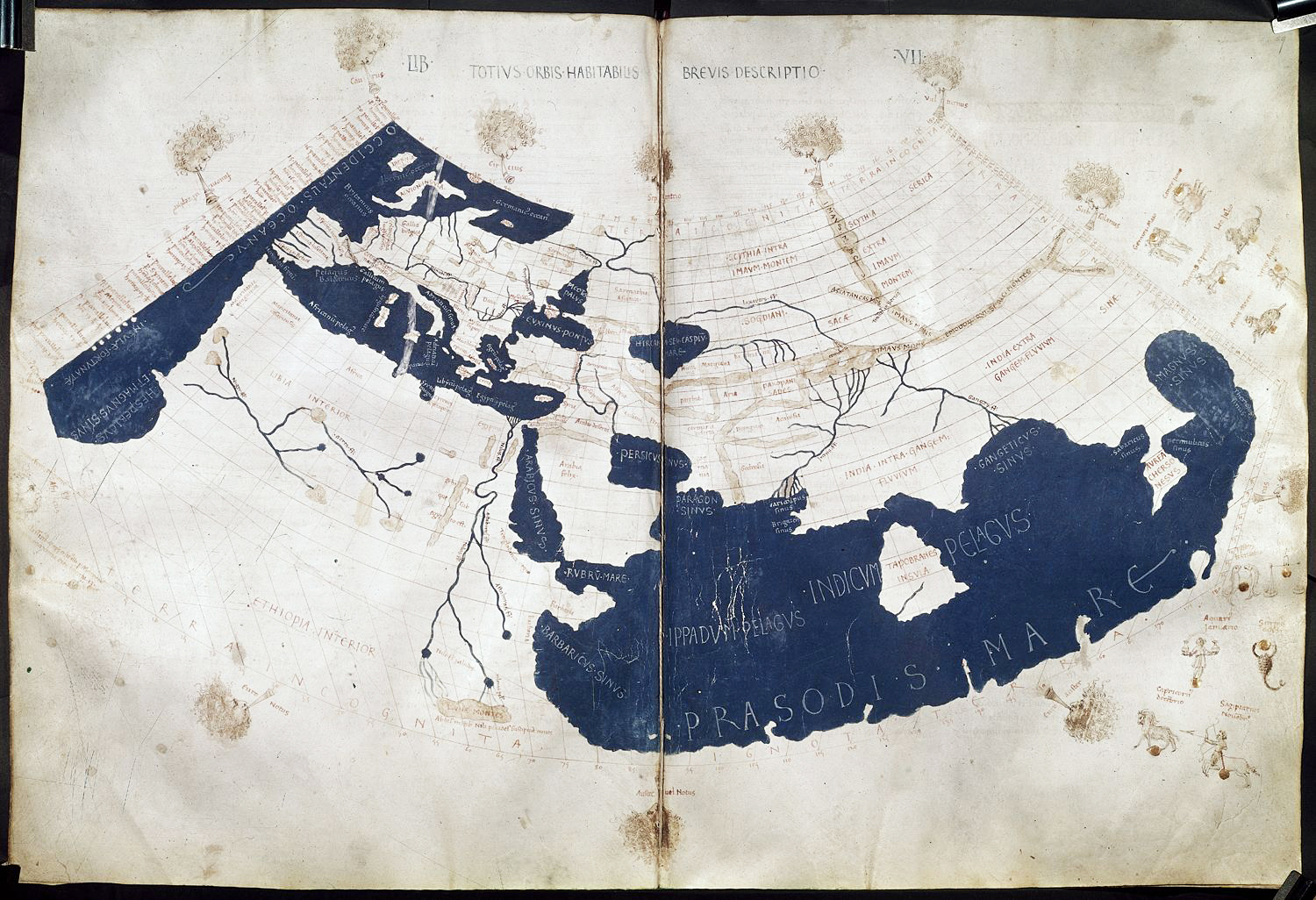
A mid-15th century Florentine world map based on the 1st (modified conic) projection in Jacobus Angelus's 1406 Latin translation of Maximus Planudes's late-13th century rediscovered Greek manuscripts of Ptolemy's 2nd-century Geography. Serica is shown in the far northeast of the world.

Serica (/ˈsɛrɪkə/, Ancient Greek: Σηρική) was one of the easternmost countries of Asia known to the Ancient Greek and Roman geographers. It is generally taken as referring to North China during its Zhou, Qin, and Han dynasties, as it was reached via the overland Silk Road in contrast to the Sinae, who were reached via the maritime routes. A similar distinction was later observed during the Middle Ages between "Cathay" (north) and "Mangi" or "China" (south). The people of Serica were the Seres (Ancient Greek: Σῆρες), whose name was also used for their region. Access to Serica was eased following the Han conquest of the Tarim Basin (modern Xinjiang) but largely blocked when the Parthian Empire fell to the Sassanids. Henry Yule summarized the classical geographers:

If we fuse into one the ancient notices of the Seres and their country, omitting anomalous statements and manifest fables, the result will be something like the following:—"The region of the Seres is a vast and populous country, touching on the east the Ocean and the limits of the habitable world, and extending west to Imaus and the confines of Bactria. The people are civilized, mild, just, and frugal, eschewing collisions with their neighbours, and even shy of close intercourse, but not averse to dispose of their own products, of which raw silk is the staple, but which include also silk-stuffs, fine furs, and iron of remarkable quality." That is manifestly a definition of the Chinese.

Some scholars, however, contend the Seres were not the Chinese themselves but tribes speaking Indo-European languages on the western edges of the Chinese dynasties and empires who traded with the ancient Indians, such as the Yuezhi, Saka, and Tocharians.

== Name ==
The Latin forms Serica and Seres derive from the Greek Sērikḗ (Σηρική) and Sḗres (Σῆρες). This seems to derive from their words for silk (Ancient Greek: σηρικός, sērikós; Latin: sericum), which since Klaproth has often been linked to the Chinese 絲, whose Old Chinese pronunciation has been reconstructed as /*[s]ə/. (Note: The rhotic final of the Greek and Roman term may have been dialectical or a Central Asian addition. Yule notes the Korean, Mongolian, and Manchu forms of the word as sir, sirkek, and sirghé respectively.) The Greeks and Romans knew of silk long before they understood its origin from silkworms, making sēr (σὴρ) a backformation. Other forms of the name include Serica Regio. Flavius Josephus, in his book Antiquities of the Jews, book 1, paragraph 147, calls that region "Σηρια", that in Latin letters is "Seria".

Some classicists have argued that it was extremely improbable that a nation would be named after an insect. Christian Lassen claimed to have identified references to the Seres in Hinduism's Vedas, as the "Çaka [Sakas], Tukhâra [Bactria], and Kanka [Kangju]".

== Accounts ==
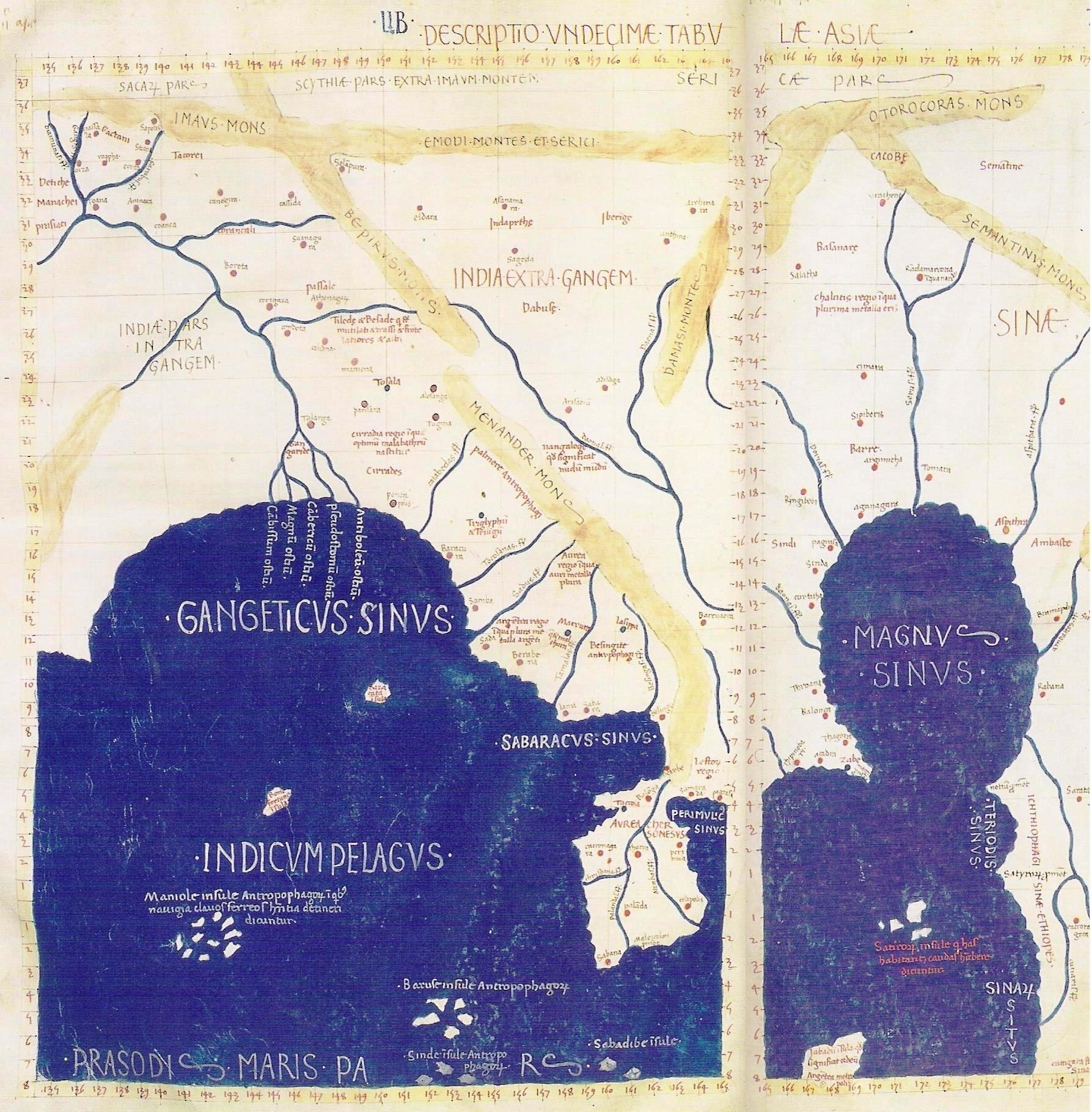
A Latin inset map derived from Ptolemy's Geography. Serica (Sericae Pars) lies to the north of the Sinae, who lie on the Great Gulf (Magnus Sinus) at the eastern end of a land-locked Indian Ocean (Indicum Pelagus).

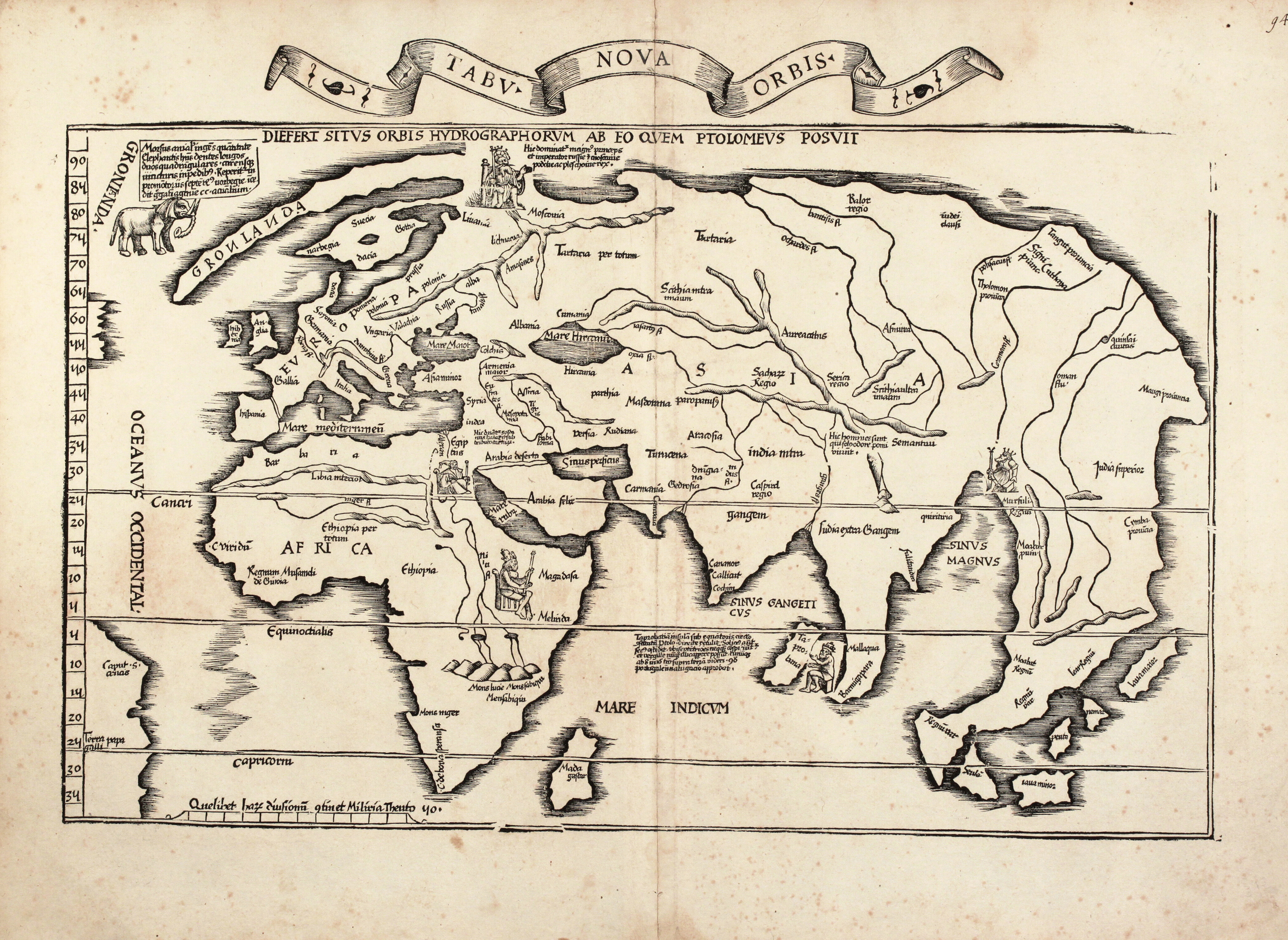
Laurent Fries's 1522 world map, including both Serica (Serica Regio) north of the Himalayas and Cathay (Cathaya) in far northeastern Asia.

=== Overview ===
Beginning in the 1st century BC with Virgil, Horace, and Strabo, Roman histories offer only vague accounts of China and the silk-producing Seres of the Far East. Florus seems to have confused the Seres with peoples of India, or at least noted that their skin complexions proved that they both lived "beneath another sky" than the Romans. The 1st-century geographer Pomponius Mela asserted that the lands of the Seres formed the center of the coast of an eastern ocean, flanked to the south by India and to the north by the Scythians of the Eurasian Steppe. The historian Ammianus Marcellinus (c. 330 – c. 400) wrote that the land of the Seres was enclosed by great natural walls around a river called Bautis, possibly a description of the Yellow River. From Turkic peoples of Central Asia the later Eastern Romans (i.e. Byzantines) derived a new name for China, Taugast (Turkic: Tabghach), during its Northern Wei (386–535) period. By the time of the Eastern Roman ruler Justinian I (r. 527–565), the Byzantines purchased Chinese silk from Sogdian intermediaries. However, they also smuggled silkworms out of China with the help of Nestorian monks, who claimed that the land of "Serinda" was located north of India and produced the finest silk.

=== Ctesias ===
The first surviving European accounts of the Seres are those in Ctesias's 5th-century BC Indica, where he calls them "a people of portentous stature and longevity". The authenticity of the account is, however, disputed.

=== Strabo ===
Strabo's 1st-century Geography mentions the Seres in two asides. In the first passage, he mentions that "some writers" claim the Seres to be longer lived than the Indians of Musicanus, whom Onesicritus claimed lived to the age of 130. In the second, a passage discussing the Greco-Bactrian Kingdom, he mentions that Apollodorus of Artemita claimed the Bactrians' borders stretched "even as far as the Seres and the Phryni".

=== Pomponius Mela ===
Pomponius Mela's De situ orbis names the Seres as one of three peoples inhabiting the eastern extremity of Asia. He places the Seres between the Indians to the south and the Scythians to the north. (Note: "In the furthest east of Asia are the Indians, Seres, and Scythians. The Indians and Scythians occupy the two extremities, the Seres are in the middle.) In a later passage, he notes:

From these the course [of the Caspian shore] makes a bend and trends to the coast line which faces the east. That part which adjoins the Scythian promontory is first all impassable from snow; then an uncultivated tract occupied by savages. These tribes are the Cannibal Scythians and the Sakas, severed from one another by a region where none can dwell because of the number of wild animals. Another vast wilderness follows, occupied also by wild beasts, reaching to a mountain called Thabis which overhangs the sea. A long way from that the ridge of Taurus rises. The Seres come between the two; a race eminent for integrity and well known for the trade which they allow to be transacted behind their backs, leaving their wares in a desert spot.

=== Pliny ===
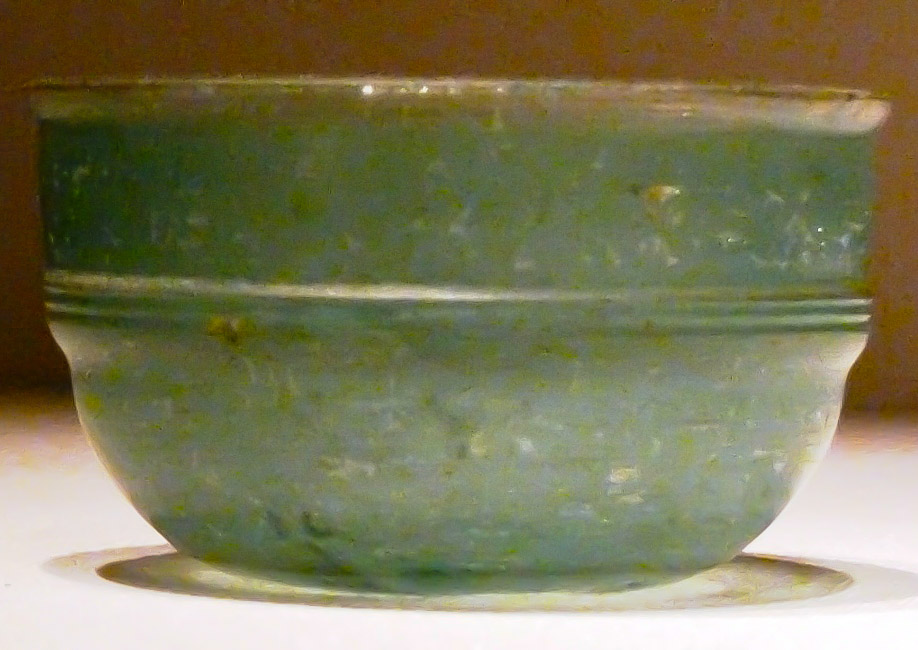
Green Roman glass cup unearthed from an Eastern Han dynasty (25–220 AD) tomb, Guangxi, China

Pliny the Elder discussed the Seres in his Natural History, Book VI, chapter xx. He similarly placed the Seres beyond a wasteland on the other side of Scythia; like Vergil before him, he patently misunderstands sericulture, believing the silk to be a product of certain trees:

Then [sc. east of the Caspian], we again find tribes of Scythians and again desert tracts occupied only by wild animals, till we come to that mountain chain overhanging the sea which is called Tabis. Not till nearly half the length of the coast which looks north-east has been past do you find inhabited country. The first race then encountered are the Seres, so famous for the fleecy product of their forests ... The Seres are famous for the woolen substance obtained from their forests; after a soaking in water they comb off the white down of the leaves ... So manifold is the labour employed, and so distant is the region of the globe drawn upon, to enable the Roman maiden to flaunt transparent clothing in public ...

Ammianus also reports this version, although Pausanias knew that silk came from insects specially cultivated by the Seres for the purpose, suggesting closer attention to Roman diplomats and traders who had visited China.

Elsewhere, Pliny mentions that their iron—which they "send to us with their tissues and skins"—is the highest quality in the world, surpassing even Parthian iron.

Pliny also reports a curious description of the Seres made by an embassy from Taprobane to Emperor Claudius, suggesting they may be referring to the Indo-European populations of the Tarim Basin, such as the Tocharians:

They also informed us that the side of their island which lies opposite to India is ten thousand stadia in length, and runs in a south-easterly direction—that beyond the Emodian Mountains (Himalayas) they look towards the Serve (Seres), whose acquaintance they had also made in the pursuits of commerce; that the father of Rachias (the ambassador) had frequently visited their country, and that the Serae always came to meet them on their arrival. These people, they said, exceeded the ordinary human height, had flaxen hair, and blue eyes, and made an uncouth sort of noise by way of talking, having no language of their own for the purpose of communicating their thoughts. The rest of their information (on the Serae) was of a similar nature to that communicated by our merchants. It was to the effect that the merchandize on sale was left by them upon the opposite bank of a river on their coast, and it was then removed by the natives, if they thought proper to deal on terms of exchange. On no grounds ought luxury with greater reason to be detested by us, than if we only transport our thoughts to these scenes, and then reflect, what are its demands, to what distant spots it sends in order to satisfy them, and for how mean and how unworthy an end!

=== Ptolemy ===
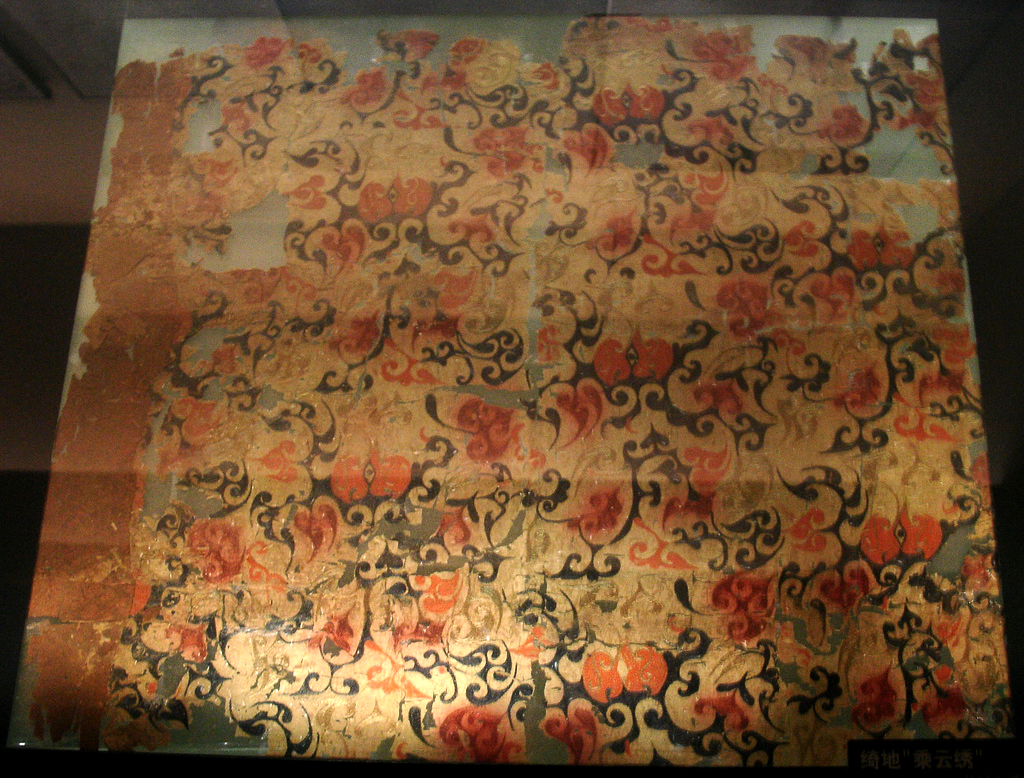
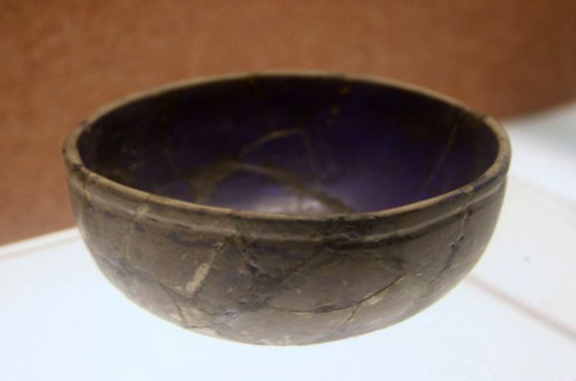
Left image: Woven silk textile from Mawangdui, Changsha, Hunan province, China, Western Han period, 2nd century BC
Right image: A Western Han (202 BC – 9 AD) blue-glass bowl; although the Chinese had been making glass beads based on imports from West Asia since the Spring and Autumn period (722–481 BC), the first Chinese glasswares appeared during the Western Han era.

The country of "Serica" is positioned in the 150 AD Ptolemy world map in the area beyond the "Imaus" (Pamir Mountains). This shows that he considered Serica to either incorporate or consist of what is now Xinjiang.

The inhabited part of our earth is bounded on the east by the Unknown Land which lies along the region occupied by the easternmost nations of Asia Major, the Sinae and the nations of Serice

— Ptolemy, Geographia, ca 150 AD

Ptolemy also positions the Sinae quite precisely:

The eastern extremity of the known earth is limited by the meridian drawn through the metropolis of the Sinae, at a distance from Alexandria of 119.5 degrees, reckoned upon the equator, or about eight equinoctial hours.

— Book vii, ch. 5

Ptolemy also speaks of "Sera, the Capital of the Seres". Henry Yule argued that Ptolemy's misrendering of the Indian Sea as a closed basin meant that Ptolemy must also have misplaced the Chinese coast, and therefore the idea that Sinae is a separate country from Serica would be a misconception.

In his Geography, Ptolemy wrote of lands in and around the Indian Ocean. He explained that a port city called Kattigara lay beyond the Golden Chersonese (i.e. the Malay Peninsula) and was visited by a Greek sailor named Alexander, most likely a merchant. In an 1877 publication Ferdinand von Richthofen offered the idea that Kattigara was located near modern Hanoi, within the ancient Chinese province of Jiaozhi that existed in northern Vietnam. However, archaeological finds of Roman and Mediterranean artefacts at Óc Eo (near Ho Chi Minh City) in the Mekong Delta of southern Vietnam hint that this was the location of the port city related by Ptolemy. Roman golden medallions dating to the reign of Antoninus Pius and Marcus Aurelius were uncovered there, seeming to suggest Roman commercial activity in Southeast Asia during at least the Antonine period (supported by other finds in Thailand, Indonesia, and Malaysia). Chinese histories affirmed that merchants of "Daqin" (i.e. the Roman Empire) were active in Cambodia and Vietnam. The archaeological evidence seems to correspond with the Chinese claim that a Roman embassy sent by a ruler named "Andun" (安敦; either Antoninus Pius or Marcus Aurelius) in 166 AD first arrived in Jiaozhi, the same region as other Chinese-recorded Roman embassies to follow.

== Geography and economy ==
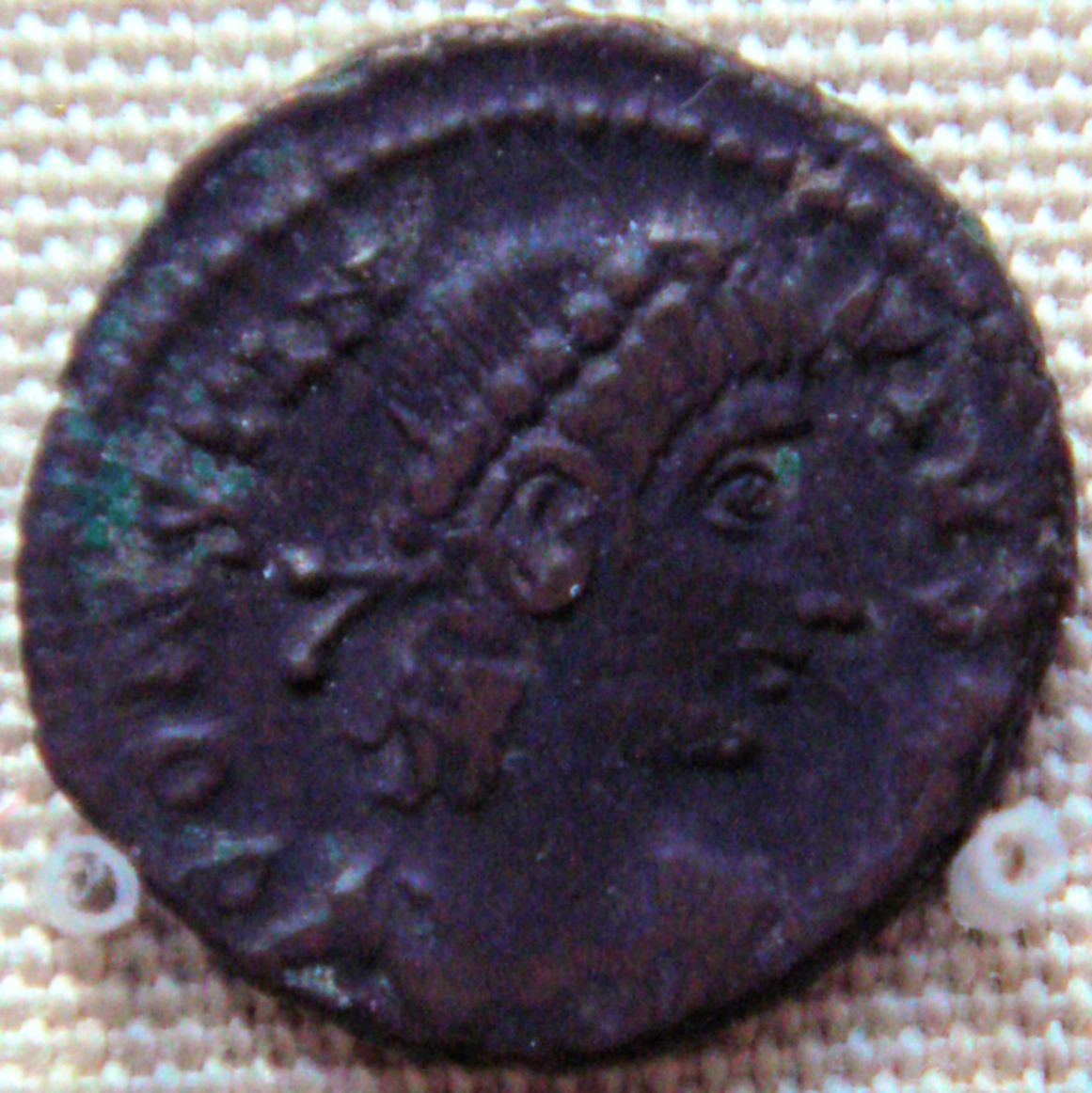
Bronze coin of Constantius II (337–361), found in Karghalik, modern China

As Ptolemy describes it, Serica was bordered in the north by the Annibi and Auxacii Montes, identified as the Altai Mountains. The Montes Asmiraei, a Serican district, are the Da-Uri Chain while the Cassi Montes are believed to be the mountains of the Gobi Desert. Ptolemy names the principal river of the Seres as the Bautisus, identified as the Yellow River.

The Greco-Roman writers name over a dozen tribes and fifteen cities of the Seres. It is evident from their portrayals that they are not all of the same ethnicity but share a common national appellation. Their capital is named as Sera. Possible candidates include Kashgar and Yarkand. Issedon, the capital of the Serican Issedones, is thought to have been situated on the eastern slopes of the Pamirs or even the Altai Mountains, while the third notable city, Aspacara, was described as located near the source of the Yellow River.

The ancient fathers also describe the pleasant climate of Serica and its plenitude in natural resources. Among these are iron, furs and skins, and precious stones.

== See also ==
- Xiongnu
- Golden Chersonese, the Malay Peninsula described by Ptolemy
- Kattigara, the Vietnamese port of Chinese-controlled Jiaozhou (region) described by Ptolemy
- Sino-Roman relations
- History of the Han dynasty
- Daqin, Rome as understood by the Chinese
- Zhang Qian, an explorer of the overland Silk Road from the Chinese end
