= Monetary history of Iran =

Coinage of Iran covers the history of coins and monetary systems used across the Iranian world from antiquity to the modern era. The tradition of Iranian coinage spans several major historical periods, beginning with the Achaemenid, continuing through successive empires including the Parthian and Sasanian dynasties, and extending into the Islamic period under the Arab–Sasanian rulers, the Safavids, Afsharids, Zands, and Qajars.

== Ancient period ==
- Achaemenid coinage
- Drachma
- Seleucid coinage
- Parthian coinage
- Sasanian coinage

== Islamic period ==
- Arab–Sasanian coinage
- Safavid period (1502–1722)
- Afsharid and Zand period (1722–1794)
- Qajar period (1779–1925)
