= Names of Java =

The island of Java has been referred to by a variety of names throughout its history. These names reflect the changing knowledge about Java of peoples throughout Eurasia, sometimes drawing on legendary or secondhand information, rather than direct experience. The earliest references to Java in written texts date to around the beginning of the Common Era, or possibly slightly earlier, all found in foreign sources. It is only from around the middle of the second millennium CE, as Chinese and Europeans established close, regular and permanent contact with the Javanese, that the global nomenclature of Java stabilised.

== Southeast Asian ==
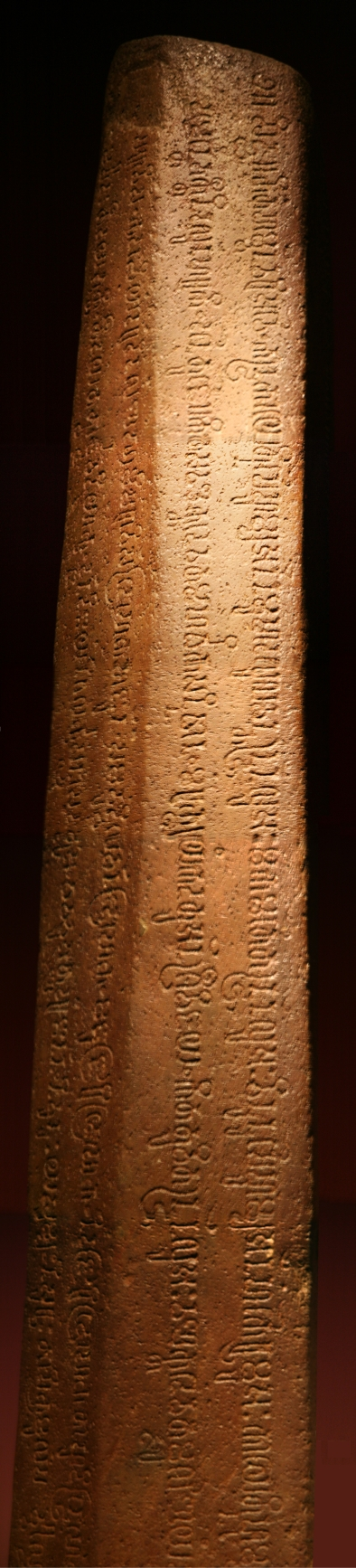
Kota Kapur inscription, issued in 686 AD, contains an early attestation of the toponym Jawa.

Inhabitants of Java and neighboring islands refer to the island as Jawa [d͡ʒa wa], and there are several theories about the ultimate etymology of the word. The linguist Robert Blust argued that the toponym is based on the reflex of jawa "foxtail millet" (jawawut in modern Indonesian), which derives from the Proto-Austronesian root *zawa. (Note: It has been suggested that the term java/jawa itself was borrowed from Sanskrit yava/yawa. But Blust doubted this etymology and identified *zawa as a Proto-Austronesian word that would derive jawa in the Old Javanese language. The Sanskrit reference to barley is problematic, since it is not a crop native to Southeast Asia, so Blust offered alternative glosses of "millet" and generic "grain" for *zawa. Griffiths agreed with the priority of jawa over yava) The historian Michael Laffan however argued that the vernacular form Jawa was derived from an older form *yaba, based on the directionality of sound changes in Malay and Javanese. (Note: Laffan concludes: "we must be open to the strong possibility that ‘Yava’ was known in the vernacular of its inhabitants as Yaba during the earliest period of Indianization. At the very least I would maintain that this form best explains Ptolemy’s Iabadiou without any need for Indian mediation." Laffan's argument draws on the work of Waruno Mahdi, who suggests that the toponym Jawa/Yava may have originally referred to a place in Sumatra, before becoming definitely identified with present-day Java only in the ninth century, although this idea is heavily criticized by Arlo Griffiths.)

An early attestation of the toponym Jawa from Southeast Asian sources is found in the Kota Kapur inscription. Issued in 686 AD in the Old Malay language and found on the island of Bangka, the inscription mentions a military conflict that arose due to the refusal of Java to pay homage to Srivijaya:

tātkālāña yaṁ maṁmaṁ sumpaḥ ini nipāhat di velāña yaṁ vala śrīvijaya kalivat manāpik yaṁ bhūmi jāva tida bhakti ka śrīvijaya

this imprecation formula was chiselled at the time when the army of Srivijaya had just returned from an expedition from the land of Java, which was not submissive to Srivijaya

— Kota Kapur inscription, lines 9–10

In the epigraphic record from the island of Java itself, both Old Javanese phrases (bhūmi Jawa "land of Java" or nusa Jawa "island of Java") and Sanskrit equivalent (Yavadvīpa) are used to refer to the island. The first known use of Yava in a text originating from Java is in the Canggal inscription, a Sanskrit panegyric issued in 732 AD by a king in Central Java. (Note: Stanza VII: āsīd dvīpavaraṃ yavākhyam atulan (dhā)[nyā]divījādhikaṃ 'There once was this excellent island called Yava') Here the Sanskrit name is followed by description of the island which draws heavily on Sanskrit poetic models, quite possibly including passage of the Ramayana. An early attestation of Jawa in Javanese source can be found in the Shivagrha inscription (856 AD). (Note: Stanza VI: 𑼪𑼖𑽂𑼬𑼒𑽂𑼰𑼩𑼹𑼪𑼶𑼬𑼶𑼙𑼮 maṅrakṣa bhūmi ri java 'protecting the land of Java.')

Both toponyms Jawa/Java and Yawa/Yava (Note: Different scholarly conventions apply to the romanisation of the bilabial approximant phoneme /ʋ/. In phonemic transcription of Austronesian languages such as Javanese and Malay, the phoneme is romanised as ⟨w⟩, while in the transcription of Indo-Aryan languages like Sanskrit and Pali, it is romanised as ⟨v⟩. Thus the toponym Java is spelled ⟨Jawa⟩ when it appears in Austronesian languages and as ⟨Java⟩ when it appears in Indo-Aryan languages, with the understanding that no phonemic difference between ⟨w⟩ and ⟨v⟩ is implied by this choice of convention. For strict transliteration from primary sources written in Brahmic scripts, the ⟨v⟩ is used even in Austronesian-language words.) appear in mainland Southeast Asian inscriptions of a similar period. While some scholars such as Michel Ferlus have suggested these names may refer to localities on the mainland, Arlo Griffiths argues that they most likely refer to the island of Java as known today. A famous Cambodian source mentioning Java is the 11th-century Sdok Kok Thom inscription (K. 235), which recounts a legend of the Jayavarman II's declaration of Cambodia's independence from Java in 802 CE. Other references to Java, both as Java and Yavadvīpa, are found in a number of Cambodian inscriptions dating from the ninth to twelfth century, plus one possible example dating as early as in 626 AD (inscription K. 60). Inscriptions from Champa spanning the ninth to fifteenth centuries describe diplomatic relations with Java, as well as the presence of Javanese amongst the ethnically diverse slave population of Champa.

== South Asian ==
Java first appears in South Asian literary works around the turn of the Common Era. In Sanskrit texts, Java was referred to as Yavadvīpa, with dvīpa meaning "island" and yava meaning "barley". As barley is not a native crop of Southeast Asia, it has been argued that the word yava may have been chosen by Sanskrit writers simply as a phonetic approximation to a pre-existing Southeast Asian term jawa (or something similar), without the meaning "barley" having any real significance.

In the famous South Asian epic Ramayana, king Sugriva of the vanara (monkeys), as the chief ally of the eponymous hero Rama, instructs his troops to go to Yavadvīpa in search of Rama's kidnapped consort Sita:

"And you must go to those islands that can be reached from mountains, by swimming or by boat: to Yavadvīpa rich in jewels, splendid with its seven kingdoms, and to Suvarṇarūpyaka [or, abounding in gold and silver] ornamented with gold mines. Beyond Yavadvīpa, there is a mountain named Śiśira. Touching the sky with its peaks, it is frequented by gods and dānavas." (Note: Lefeber gives an explanatory note of the ambiguous wording of this passage: "In his Introduction, Mankad (1965, pp. xxxviii, xl, and xli) has an extensive but confused discussion of Yavadvīpa, which he says is a corruption of Jambūdvīpa, the island named here by all N manuscripts but B4. The compound suvarṇarūpyakam means literally ‘gold and silver’. This may be one island (Cm, Cg) or two (Ck, Ct) and may be either a description or a proper name.”)

— Sugriva, in Rosalind Lefeber (trans.), Kiṣkindhākāṇḍa, stanzas 28–30

Java is mentioned in the ancient Tamil epic Maṇimēkalai by the poet Satthanar, which states that Java (rendered as சாவகம் cāvakam) had a kingdom with a capital called "Nagapuram". The toponym Java also appears in the Pāli scripture Mahāniddesa (likely pre-1st century BCE) as a place to be reached by boats. (Note: Sloka VII (Tissametteyyasuttaniddesa): atha vā kāmataṇhāya abhibhūto pariyāḍinnacitto bhoge pariyesanto nāvāya mahāsamuddaṁ pakkhandat, sītassa purakkhato, uṇhassa purakkhato, ḍaṁsamakasavātāta pasiriṁsapasamphassehi rissamāno khuppipāsāya pīḷiyamāno Gumbaṁ gacchati, Takkolaṁ gacchati, Takkasilaṁ gacchati, Kālamukhaṁ gacchati, Maraṇapāraṁ gacchati, Vesuṅgaṁ gacchati, Verāpathaṁ gacchati, Javaṃ gacchati, Tamaliṁ gacchati, Vaṅgaṁ gacchati, Eḷavaddanaṁ gacchati. English translation by Wheatley, based on Sylvain Lévi's French: "he puts forth on to the high seas, and enduring frost and heat, mosquitoes and stingin insects, wind and sun, and hunger and thirst, he voyages on to Gumba, Takkola, Takkasila, Kalamukha, Maraṇapāra, Vesuṅga, Verāpatha, Java, Tamali, Vaṅga, Eḷavaddana")

== Ancient European ==
It is probably through Indian intermediaries that Java first became known to the West. An island called Ἰαβαδίου (Iabadiu), which apparently refers to Java, is mentioned in Claudius Ptolemy's Geographia (c. 150 CE), composed during the height of the Roman Empire. The Greek term Iabadiu possibly derives from a Middle Indo-Aryan language and seems to be a synonym of the Sanskrit Yāvadvīpa. In this text, Iabadiu is described as being rich in gold and "having a city called Silver" (ἔχειν τε μητρόπολιν ὀνοματι Ἀργυρῆν) located at its western end.

Ptolemy mentions two other relevant toponyms in the vicinity of the Indonesian archipelago: Σαβαδιβαὶ (Sabadibai) and Ζάβαι (Zabai). While some scholars have attempted to identify these names with precise modern locations, it may well be that they all represent variants of the same toponym based on a word for Java. (Note: Willem van der Meulen suggests that the element Saba, as reflected in the Greek terms Zabai, Sabadibai (? < Prakrit languages: *Sabadīpa "island of Saba"), and Sabana/Sabara (? < Sanskrit: *Sabārṇa "strait of Saba"), may ultimately come from a word for Java. This argument applies only to the etymology of these words, as their geographical locations given by Ptolemy do not accord with each other or with present-day Java.)

Ptolemy was one of a number of Roman writers that describe cities of gold and silver (Chryse and Argyre) in the far east; others included Pomponius Mela (d. 45 BC), Pliny the Elder (b. 23 or 24 – d. 79 AD) and Gaius Julius Solinus (fl. 3rd century AD). The similarities to the Rāmāyaṇa's description of Yavadvīpa as a land of gold and silver (Sanskrit: suvarṇarūpyaka) suggest the possibility that Indian stories may have been the source of these legendary images.

== East Asian ==
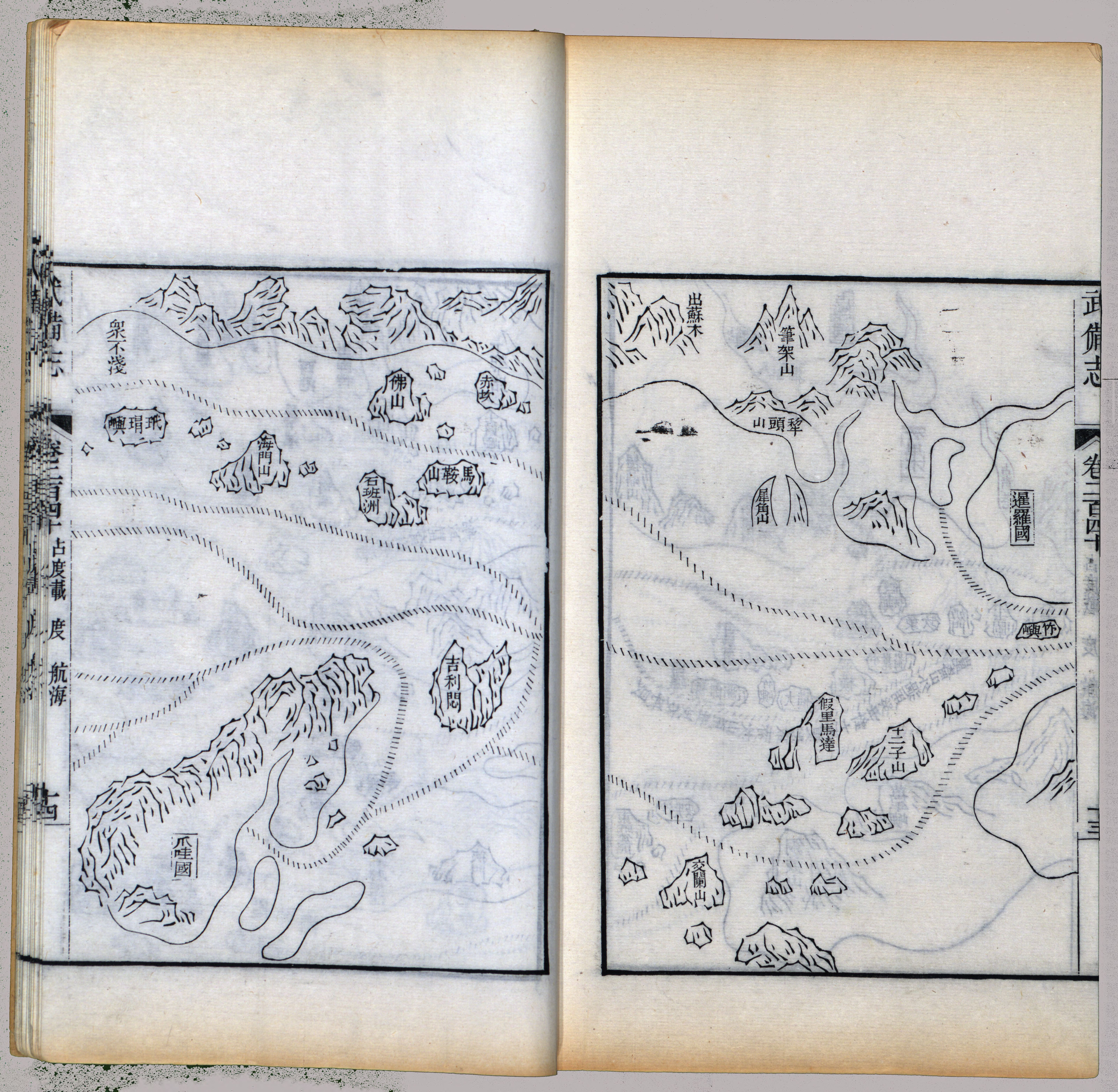
Java rendered as 爪哇 Zhǎowā (bottom left) in Ma Huan's 15th century The Overall Survey of the Ocean's Shores

Chinese sources provide another body of data about the toponym Java, though not fully independent of Indian influence. The oldest source to mention Java is the Han Records of the Eastern Lodge (東觀漢記 Dōngguān Hànjì), compiled in the first or second century CE, which uses the term 葉調 Yèdiào (Late Middle Chinese pronunciation: [jiap dɛwh]). The Chinese Buddhist pilgrim Faxian mentions a brief visit to an island he calls 耶婆提 Yépótí (Late Middle Chinese pronunciation: [jia ba dɛj]). The similarity of the pronunciation of these toponyms to the Greek Iabadiu suggests a common Middle Indo-Aryan source word.

In the 5th century, there emerged a new Chinese toponym 闍婆 Shépó (Late Middle Chinese pronunciation: [d͡ʑia bwa]), as found in the court chronicles Book of Song (late 5th century) and Book of Liang (7th century). (Note: The Chinese toponyms 諸薄 Zhūbó (Late Middle Chinese pronunciation: [t͡ɕia bwak̚] and 杜薄 Dùbó (Late Middle Chinese pronunciation: [dɔ^{X} bwak̚]), which survive in later quotations from the 3rd-century traveller Kang Tai, have been tentatively identified as Java, though Borneo may be another possible identification.) The Middle Chinese pronunciation of this word much more closely matches the Old Javanese jawa (Kawi pronunciation: [d͡ʒa wa]), which may indicate that the Chinese were beginning to have direct knowledge of the island. Chinese texts also reference a kingdom on Java's northern coast known as 訶陵 Hēlíng (Late Middle Chinese pronunciation: [ha liŋ]) from 640–818 AD. The island was referred to as 闍婆 (Shépó) until the Yuan Dynasty (1271–1368), whereupon it began to be called 爪哇 (Zhǎowā), the present-day name in Mandarin Chinese. In his 1451 book The Overall Survey of the Ocean's Shores, Chinese explorer Ma Huan, who accompanied the famous Admiral Zheng He on three of his Ming treasure voyages, noted that the Chinese referred to Java as 爪哇 (Zhǎowā), and that it had previously been called 闍婆 (Shépó).

The Chinese names for Java were borrowed by neighbouring peoples who shared Sinitic cultural traditions. The Complete Annals of Đại Việt, a Vietnamese imperial chronicle, records a military incursion in 767 CE of people from 阇婆 Đồ bà, while other entries in the same text use the later term 爪哇 Trào-oa. Both these Vietnamese names for Java share the same logographic characters and similar pronunciation as the Middle Chinese 闍婆 (Shépó) and Early Modern Chinese 爪哇 (Zhǎowā).

== West Asian ==
World map from Al-Idrisi's Tabula Rogeriana orientated towards the south. Several islands in the upper left corner that loosely correspond to maritime Southeast Asia are labelled as Waqwaq واق واق.

Historians have proposed a number of terms that could refer to Java in works by medieval Arabic geographers. Many of these terms however are used inconsistently between sources and difficult to verify; the same term could refer to Java, islands adjacent to Java, or entirely fictitious locations as writers frequently adopt terms from earlier accounts without personal experience of visiting the region.

In the Middle Ages, Muslim writers began to refer to the islands of Indonesia by the term Zābaj (Arabic: زابج), found in works such as Buzurg ibn Shahriyar's 10th century The Book of the Wonders of India (Kitāb Aja'ib al-Hind Barrihi). One of the earliest mentions of the term Zābaj is in the first part of the travelogue Accounts of China and India (Akhbār al-Ṣīn wa’l-Hind), written in 237 AH/851–852 AD. (Note: This first part is sometimes credited to the 9th-century Persian merchant Sulayman the Merchant of Siraf, but this authorship is uncertain. Irawan Djoko Nugroho incorrectly attributes the second part of the text to Sulayman, though it states explicitly that it was written by Abu Zayd al-Sirafi.) The second part of the same work, written by Abu Zayd al-Sirafi in the late 9th or early 10th century, gives a more detailed account of Zābaj as a large political entity spanning multiple islands in Southeast Asia. Some historians identify Zābaj as Java, although other identifications such as Srivijaya have also been proposed.

Ibn Khordadbeh in his Book of Roads and Kingdoms (9th century), uniquely among the early Muslim geographers, used the term Jāba (Arabic: جابة). This may be an alternative spelling of Zābaj or possibly conceived as a separate entity. (Note: Tibbetts noted that the Jāba spelling is unique to Ibn Khordadbeh and the summary of his work given by Muhammad al-Idrisi, making it difficult to determine whether Jāba had a separate identity from Zābag: "The awkward part however is that in both places where the Akhbār al-Ṣīn mentiones Zābaj, Ibn Khurdādhbih uses Jāba. Thus the Akhbār al-Ṣīn states that Kālah is a kingdom of Zābaj and Ibn Khurdādbhih says it belongs to the kingdom of Jābat al-Hindī; and when the former mentions the volcano near Zābaj, the latter puts it near Jāba. [...] Whenever Jāba is spelt in this manner, it must be derived from Ibn Khurdādhbih or some contemporary source.") The Jāba usage was not widely adopted by other Arabic writers; after Ibn Khordadbeh, "no more is heard of Jāba, unless the name is echoed in the later name of Jāwa".

Another name used in Arabic sources is Wāqwāq (Arabic: واق واق), which was used as a label for certain islands of maritime southeast Asia in maps such as Tabula Rogeriana by Al-Idrisi. Like Zābaj, however, the toponym Wāqwāq tend to be used very broadly and more often used for imagined places.

Around the 13th century, Middle Eastern vessels began to visit Javanese ports more regularly and the term Jāwa (Arabic: جاوة), more in line with local pronunciation, began to displace Zābaj in Arabic sources such as Dictionary of Countries (Kitāb Mu'jam al-Buldān) compiled by Yaqut al-Hamawi. But rather than being solely a term for the island of Java, the Arabic term Jāwa "seems to have functioned both as a regional toponym and as a collective noun in the 14th century." The famous Travels of Ibn Battuta refers to al-Jāwa and Mul Jāwa as separate islands, indicating that the term Jāwa had become a generic Arabic term for the Indonesian archipelago by this time. (Note: In Ibn Battuta's account, the king of al-Jāwa is a Shafi'i Muslim called Sultan Malik al-Zahir and resides in a city called Sumutrah. These details make it certain that the polity referred to is Samudra Pasai on the far north coast of Sumatra. The other kingdom mentioned is Mul Jāwa (Arabic: مُلْ جاوة), which said to be a centre of a Hindu polity, where he met the ruler and stayed as a guest for three days. Another kingdom mentioned by Ibn Battuta, which some present-day scholars identify with the island of Java, is Tawalisi (Arabic: طواليسي), where he met a local princess named Urduja.)

== Medieval European ==
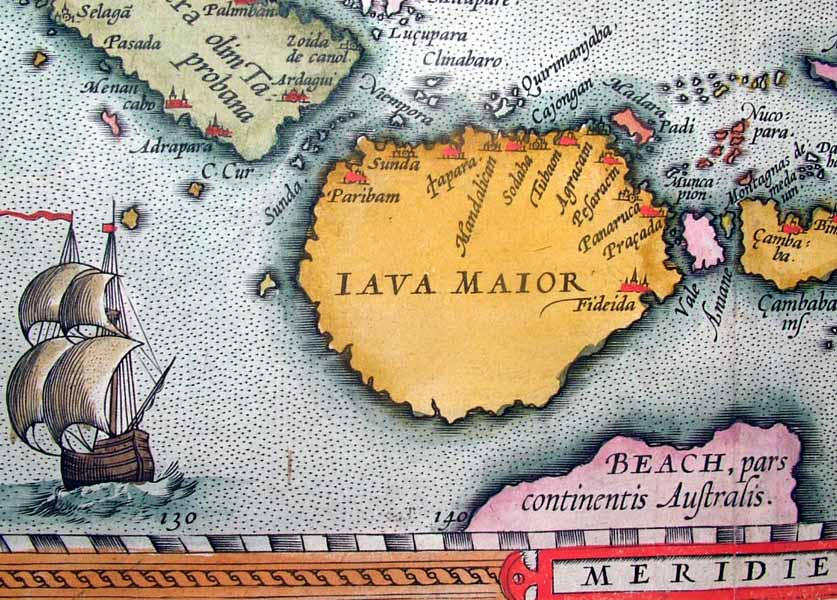
Java rendered as Iava Maior in Abraham Ortelius' Theatrum Orbis Terrarum, 1603 Latin edition.

Late medieval Europeans used the term Iava/Iaua (Note: The letter ⟨u⟩ and ⟨v⟩ were not always considered distinct at this time period.) (sometimes misspelled Iana) in Latin and their vernacular languages to refer to Java and its neighbouring islands. In the famous Travels of Marco Polo, a distinction is made between the "great island of Iaua" (Old French: grant ille de iaua), referring to Java as understood today, and the "lesser island of Iaua" (Old French: menour ille de iana), identified with Sumatra. This practice seems to reflect Islamic influence, as seen by Ibn Battuta's similar handling of the Jāwa toponym in Arabic. One of the few European travellers who actually visited Java during this time, Odoric of Pordenone, uses the term Iaua only to refer to Java proper. The "two Iauas" schema continued to influence European geographical thinking well into the 16th century, with the labels "great Java" and "lesser Java" being applied vaguely and inconsistently by travellers such as Niccolò de' Conti, writers like Duarte Barbosa, and map-makers such as Johne Rotz.

Some Europeans used the names Saba and Shabait instead of Iaua, which may reflect the persistent influence of the older Arabic term Zābaj. When 14th-century Italian traveler Giovanni de' Marignolli returned to Europe from Asia, he claimed to have stopped at a land called "Saba" for several months, which he said had many elephants and was led by a queen. (Note: The Queen of Saba mentioned here, echoing Odoric of Pordenone's account of Java a century earlier, is perhaps identifiable with the historical Javanese Queen Gitarja (r. 1328–ca. 1350s), though Marignolli's account is possibly also drawing on the legend of the Queen of Sheba.) The 15th-century Russian merchant Afanasy Nikitin traveled to India in 1466 and described a land which he called шабайте (šabajte) in his A Journey Beyond the Three Seas.

== Summary ==
The table below summarizes attested forms and excludes putative reconstructed forms.

Names of Java
Name	Related forms	Source	Example of use	Note
Cāvakam சாவகம்	Shavakam	Tamil	Maṇimēkalai	
Iabadiu Ἰαβαδίου		Greek	Geographia	Possibly derived from Sanskrit Yavadvīpa
Iava	Iaua, Iana	European	The Travels of Marco Polo, Theatrum Orbis Terrarum	Distinction are often made between Iava Major and Iava Minor, possibly due to influence of Arabic Jāwa.
Jāba جابة		Arabic	Kitāb al-masālik wa-l-Mamālik	Presumably derived from some archaic version of indigenous Jawa.
Java		Pali	Mahāniddesa	
Jawa 𑼙𑼮		Indigenous	Kota Kapur inscription, Shivagrha inscription	Disputed etymology. May derived from an older form *yaba, or ultimately from Proto-Austronesian *zawa "foxtail millet", among various theories.
Jāwa جاوة	Al-Jāwa, Mul Jāwa	Arabic	The Travels of Ibn Battuta, Kitāb Mu'jam al-Buldān	Derived from indigenous Jawa. But in Arabic use may refer to the island proper or collective noun of maritime Southeast Asia (resulting in accounts such as Ibn Battuta's, where al-Jāwa and Mul Jāwa are considered separate islands).
Jawi	Al-Jawi, Al-Jāwī, Al-Jazirah Al-Jawi, Al-Jāzirah Al-Jāwi	Arabic	The Travels of Ibn Battuta, Kitāb Mu'jam al-Buldān	Derived from indigenous Jawi (a variant of Jawa in high linguistic register)
Saba	Shabait	European	Travelogue of Giovanni de' Marignolli	Possibly derived from Arabic zābaj
Šabajte Шабайте		Russian	A Journey Beyond the Three Seas	Possibly derived from Arabic zābaj
Shépó 闍婆		Chinese	Book of Song, Book of Liang	Possibly derived from indigenous Jawa that underwent pronunciation shift (Late Middle Chinese pronunciation: [d͡ʑia bwa]). Used in Vietnamese chronicles as Đồ bà 阇婆.
Yava	Yavadvīpa	Sanskrit	Ramayana, Canggal inscription	
Yèdiào 葉調		Chinese	Han Records of the Eastern Lodge (東觀漢記 Dōngguān Hànjì)	Possibly derived from Sanskrit Yavadvīpa that underwent pronunciation shift (Late Middle Chinese pronunciation: [jiap dɛwh])
Yépótí 耶婆提		Chinese	Record of the Buddhist Kingdoms	Possibly derived from Sanskrit Yavadvīpa that underwent pronunciation shift (Late Middle Chinese pronunciation: [jia ba dɛj])
Zābaj زابج	Zabag	Arabic	Kitāb Aja'ib al-Hind Barrihi, Akhbār al-Ṣīn wa’l-Hind	Used broadly for maritime Southeast Asia, may also refer to adjacent islands.
Zhǎowā 爪哇		Chinese	The Overall Survey of the Ocean's Shores	Derived from indigenous Jawa. Used in Vietnamese chronicles as Trào-oa 爪哇.
