= Zabag (ancient territory) =

Former kingdom in Southeast Asia

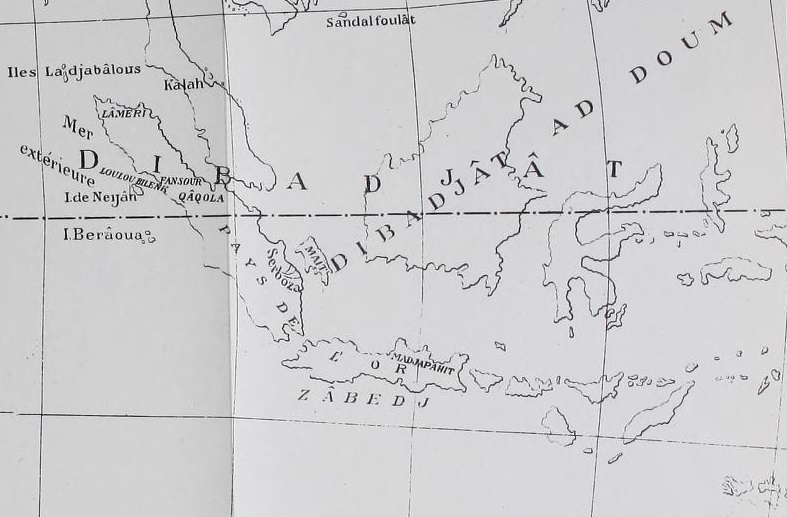
Toponym identification in Ajayib al-Hind, Zabag (Zabedj) is interpreted as Java.

Zabag (Arabic: الزابج az-Zabaj; Sanskrit: Javaka; Latin: Jabad; Chinese: 阇婆 or 闍婆 She-bó or Shepo) is thought to have been an ancient territory located south of China somewhere in Southeast Asia.

== Etymology ==
The origins of the toponym Zābaj (Arabic: زابج), with alternative spellings Jāba (Arabic: جابة) and Jāwa (Arabic: جاوة), are not very clear. Gabriel Ferrand suggested that the Zābaj form may have originated from an original word Jāwaga, consisting of the Indonesian toponym Jāwa with the suffix -ga, possibly in a Middle Indo-Aryan language. (Note: Ferrand argued that the final consonant ⟨ج⟩ represented a velar sound during ancient times, and therefore that Zābag is a more authentic transcription than Zābaj. Based on the presence of this final velar sound, he argued that a series of borrowings resulted in the chain of borrowings *Jāwaga > Zābag.) Michael Laffan questioned the plausibility of this theory, instead proposing a Sanskrit origin Yavadeśa "land of Yava", which he supposed to have been borrowed into Old Malay as Jabades, before finally being rendered as Arabic: زابج Zābaj.

== Historical sources ==
=== Abu Zayd al-Sirafi ===
The main source of the existence of the kingdom of Zabag is the travelogue Accounts of China and India (Akhbār al-Ṣīn wa-l-Hind). The term is mentioned in the first part of the work dated 237 AH/851–852 AD, which sometimes attributed to a certain Sulayman the Merchant of Siraf. While Sulayman is credited with supplying the information for this first part, it is not clear whether he is its author. The second part of the text, which is reliably attributed to the authorship of Abu Zayd al-Sirafi, gives a more complete description of Zabag:

Next we will begin an account of the city of al-Zābaj, because it is situated opposite China; the sailing time between the two lands is a month, or less than that if the winds are favorable. The king of al-Zābaj is known as al-Mihrāj (possibly an Arabic rendering of the Sanskrit term Maharaja); it is said that its extent is nine hundred farsakhs, although this king also rules over many other islands, and his entire realm is spread over a distance of a thousand farsakhs and more. His kingdom includes an island known as Sarbuzah, whose extent is reported to be four hundred farsakhs; also an island known as al-Rāmanī, extending to eight hundred farsakhs, which is home to the places where sappan wood, camphor, and other such trees grow. In addition, his kingdom includes the peninsula of Kalah (that is, Kedah), the halfway point between the lands of China and the land of the Arabs, whose extent is reported to be eighty farsakhs. [...] The authority of al-Mihrāj is obeyed throughout these islands. His island of al-Zābaj, which is his seat, is fertile in the extreme and is settled and cultivated in a most orderly manner.

Abu Zayd goes on to report fantastic anecdotes about Zabag, which have a moralistic flavor and are therefore unlikely to reflect genuine historical information. One of these is the story of the Pool of Kings, in which gold ingots were said collected upon the orders of each king, to be distributed to the populace upon his death.

Another legend reported by Abu Zayd concerns a conflict between the king of Zabag and the ruler of Al-Qamār, which scholars have interpreted as a reference to the Khmer kingdom. (Note: A summary of the story goes as follows: One day in a fit of jealousy, the Khmer ruler made the following remark in court. "I have one desire that I would like to satisfy," said the young ruler. "What is that desire, O King," inquired his faithful councillor. "I wish to see before me on a plate," remarked the monarch, "the head of the King of Zabaj." "I do not wish, O King, that my sovereign should express such a desire,” answered the minister. “The Khmer and Zabaj have never manifested hatred towards each other, either in words or in acts. Zabaj has never done us any harm. What the King has said should not be repeated." Angered by this sage advice, the Khmer ruler raised his voice and repeated his desire so that all of the generals and nobles who were present at court could hear him. Word of the young ruler's impetuous outburst passed from mouth to mouth until it finally arrived at the court of the Maharaja of Zabaj. Upon hearing the words of the Khmer ruler, the Maharaja ordered his councillor to prepare a thousand ships for departure. When the fleet was ready, the Maharaja himself went aboard and announced to the crowd on shore that he would be making a pleasure trip amongst his islands. Once at sea, however, the Maharaja orders the armada to proceed to the capital of the Khmer ruler, where his troops took the Khmers by surprise, seized the city, and surrounded the palace. After the Khmer ruler had been captured, he was brought before the Maharaja of Zabaj. "What caused you to form a desire which was not in your power to satisfy, which would not have given you happiness if you had realized it, and would not even have been justified if it had been easily realizable?" inquired the Maharaja of Zabaj. Since the Khmer king had nothing to say in return, the Maharaja of Zabaj continued. "You have manifested the desire to see before you my head on a plate. If you also had wished to seize my country and my kingdom or even only to ravage a part of it, I would have done the same to you. But since you have only expressed the first of these desires, I am going to apply to you the treatment you wished to apply to me, and I will then return to my country without taking anything belonging to the Khmer, either of great or small value." When the Maharaja returned to his own palace back home, he seated himself on the throne. Set before him was a plate upon which rested the head of the former Khmer king.)

=== Ibn Khordadbeh ===
The Kitāb al-Masālik wa'l-Mamālik (Book of Roads and Kingdoms), ascribed to Ibn Khordadbeh, was written around 870 CE, making it roughly contemporaneous with Abu Zayd's account. Ibn Khordadbeh's description of Zābag is remarkably consistent with that of Abu Zayd, including the same story of the Pool of Kings. It contains additional fantastical tales:

In the mountains of Zabag, there are enormous serpents who devour the people and the buffaloes, and there are even those who devour the elephants. The country produces great camphor trees; there are those that can extend the shade of their leaves over a hundred people [...] This island contains a multitude of wonders that one can neither enumerate nor describe.

— Kitab al-Masālik wa'l-Mamālik, based on Ferrand's French translation

=== al-Mas'udi ===
The late 10th century polymath Al-Masudi, writing in 995 AD, repeated the known facts about Zabag "in grandiloquent terms":

The kingdom of the maharaja, king of the islands of Zābag, among which are Kalah and Sribuza and other islands in the China Sea. All their kings are entitled mahārāja. This empire of the mahārāja has an enormous population and innumerable armies. Even with the fastest vessel, no one can tour these islands, all of which are inhabited, in two years. Their king possesses more kinds of perfume and aromatic substances than are possessed by any other king. His lands produce camphor, aloes, cloves, sandalwood, musk, cardamom, cubeb, etc.

— al-Mas'udi, quoted by Coedes

== Possible Locations ==
=== Srivijaya ===
Zabag could be identified with Srivijaya, an empire centered in Sumatra. The scope of the term Zabag in the various Arabic sources often covers the islands both north and west of Sumatra, which roughly corresponding with the maximum hypothesised extent Srivijaya's influence. The French scholar George Coedès noted that the Chinese references to Sanfoqi, previously interpreted as the Sanskrit term Śrībhoja, refer to the same polity as the toponym Śrīvijaya mentioned in inscriptions in Old Malay. Coedes argued that "it is certain in fact that in the tenth century Zābag corresponded to the San-fo-ch'i (Sanfoqi) of the Chinese, that is, to the Sumatran kingdom of Śrīvijaya". The phonetic resemblance of Śrīvijaya and Sarbuza (Arabic: سربزه), mentioned by Abu Zayd as a vassal of the king of Zabag, strengthens the argument that Zābag was either the same as or the overlord of Śrīvijaya in the tenth century. (Note: Coedes (1968: 320, n. 173) presents the arguments of his colleague Jean Sauvaget in support of this: "the Arabic transcription Srbza should be interpereted, according to the oldest Arabic system of transcription (in which the foreign v is rendered as b, and j as z; there are many other examples of this), as Srvja. Thus it transcribes exactly, but naturally without the notation of the vowels, Śrīvija(ya); the omission of the last syllable could be accidental, but it may also have been intentional, for the syllable -ya may have been taken for the Arabic ending -ya that had no place there."" Mackintosh-Smith (2017: 98) remains agnostic about the identification of Sarbuza: "Its location has been much discussed, especially by the editors of al-Rāmhurmuzī (ʿAjāʾib, 247–53), who identify it with Palembang, in southeastern Sumatra. Given that Sumatra is already represented in our text by the island of al-Rāmanī and that Sarbuzah is itself said to be a large island, it should perhaps be sought elsewhere. Borneo has also been suggested as a possibility. At the risk of adding to the confusion, Sulawesi, on the grounds both of its name and its size, might also be a contender.")

The Indonesian historian Slamet Muljana suggested that Zabag should be connected to the present day Muara Sabak area, the estuary of Batang Hari River in East Tanjung Jabung Regency, Jambi province. Michael Laffan acknowledges the association between Zabag and modern Sabak, but he suggests that the influence came into Malay from Middle Eastern sailors in relatively recent times.

=== Northern Borneo ===
Although Zabaj is conventionally identified with Sumatra, Java, or the Palembang-based Srivijaya empire, historian Robert Nicholl proposed an alternative location in northern Borneo. Examining medieval Arabic geographical accounts, Nicholl argued that Zabaj and its capital Sribuza (Srivijaya) were centered around Brunei Bay rather than Sumatra, suggesting that the toponym Zabaj derived from the Brunei Malay word saba ("downstream"). Furthermore, Nicholl identified Haranj—an island noted in Arabic sources as a dependency of Sumatran Zabaj (Srivijaya) and a source of high-grade camphor—with the northwestern coast of Sabah around Tuaran. In Nicholl's view, following the decline of Srivijayan influence after the 11th-century Chola raids, the designation Zabaj remained associated with this northern Bornean maritime polity.

=== Java ===
The toponym Zabag is alternatively identified with Java. Information from the first part of the Akhbār dated in 851–852 AD, possibly reported by Sulayman the Merchant, states that that Sarbuza (possibly Srivijaya) and Kalah (probably Kedah) were areas ruled by Zabag. This raises the possibility that Zabag should be identified not with Srivijaya, but instead with Java.

The writer Irawan Djoko Nugroho points out that the report by Abu Zayd in the second part of the Akhbār that the island of Zabag "is fertile in the extreme and is settled and cultivated in a most orderly manner" seems to accord better with the densely populated agrarian Java, than with the more sparsely settled and maritime-oriented Sumatra. However, another one of his arguments for identifying Zabag with Java on the basis of relative size is unreliable, as it is based on an apparent misreading of Abu Zayd's text.

The Akhbār states that "the sailing time between the two lands (namely, between China and Zabag) is a month, or less than that if the winds are favorable." This is comparable to the distance from Malacca to Majapahit as recorded by The Epic of Hang Tuah.

Other Indonesian scholars have sought to connect the toponym Zabag with the Sanskrit word sabhā, which means "meeting-place" or "assembly". However, besides the coincidental phonetic similarity there is no evidence to support this theory, as Java is not known to have been referred to by the Sanskrit name Sabhā.

== See also ==
- Sanfotsi
- Waqwaq
- Names of Java
