= Mutayyam al-Hashimiyya =

- متيم_الهشامية
- Occupation: Poet, singer
- Partner(s): Ali ibn Hisham

Mutayyam al-Hāshimiyya (fl. 9th century CE) was a singer and poet in the Abbasid Caliphate. She was ranked third by contemporaries, with only the singers Ishaq al-Mawsili and Aluya above her.

Mutayyam al-Hashimiyya was born in al-Basra. She studied under the eminent musician Ibrahim al-Mawsili and his son Ishaq al-Mawsili as well as the singer Badhl al-Kubra.

She was purchased by ʿAlī ibn Hishām, governor of Baghdad during the Fourth Fitna. (The name "al-Hāshimiyya" marked her as part of his household.) They had a daughter, Ṣafiyya, and two sons, Muḥammad and Hārūn.

She sang at the courts of both Caliphs al-Ma'mun and al-Mu'tasim. al-Ma'mun was impressed by her and engaged her in a poetry challenge. When al-Ma'mun imprisoned ʿAlī ibn Hishām, Mutayyam pled for his release in verse. al-Ma'mun did not release him, but instead executed ʿAlī ibn Hishām and made her a free woman.

Her songs were included in the anthology Kitab al-Aghani assembled by Abū al-Farāj al-Isfahānī. Zaynab Fawwaz included her in her collection of biographies of famous women, al-Durr al-manthur fi tabaqat rabbat al-khudur (The Book of Scattered Pearls Regarding Categories of Women).
