= Radhanite =

Jewish medieval merchants

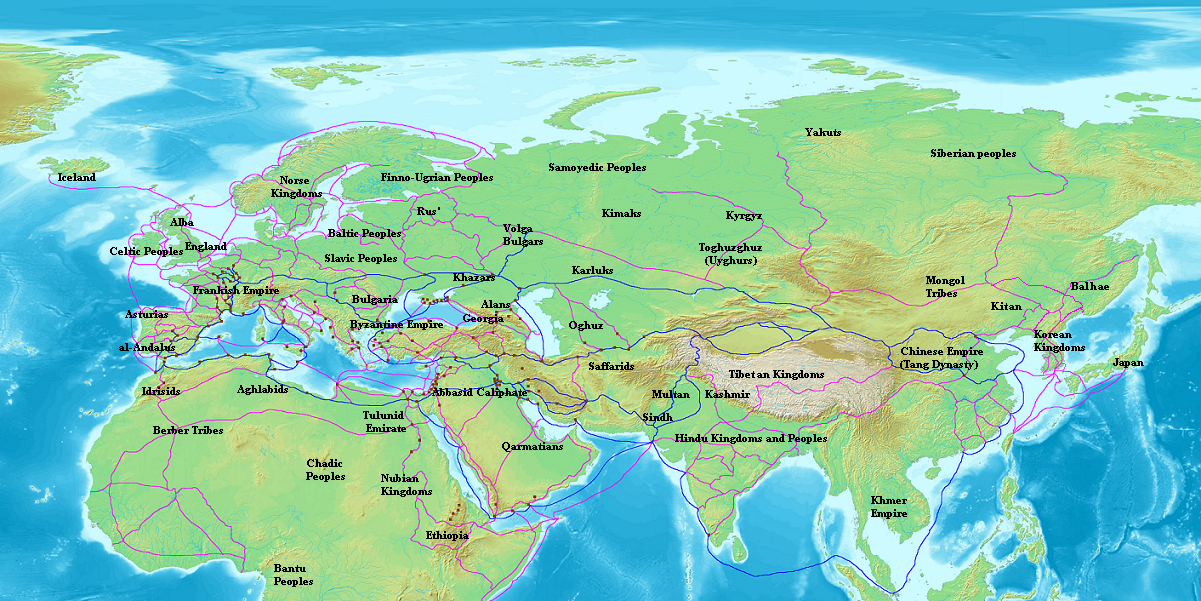
Map of Eurasia showing the trade network of the Radhanites (in blue), c. 870 AD, as reported in the account of Ibn Khordadbeh in the Book of Roads and Kingdoms; other trade routes of the period are shown in purple.

The Radhanites or Radanites (Hebrew: רדנים, romanized: Radanim; Arabic: الرذنية, romanized: ar-Raðaniyya) were early medieval Jewish merchants, active in the trade between Christendom and the Muslim world during roughly the 8th to the 10th centuries. Many trade routes previously established under the Roman Empire continued to function during that period, largely through their efforts. Their trade network covered much of Europe, North Africa, the Middle East, Central Asia, and parts of India and China.

Only a limited number of primary sources use the term, and it remains unclear whether they referred to a specific guild, to a clan, or generically to Jewish merchants in the trans-Eurasian trade network.

== Name ==
Several etymologies have been suggested for the word "Radhanite". Many scholars, including Barbier de Meynard and Moshe Gil, believe it refers to a district in Mesopotamia called "the land of Radhan" in Arabic and Hebrew texts of the period.

Another hypothesis suggests that the name might be derived from the city of Ray (Rhages) in northern Iran. Still others think the name possibly derives from the Persian terms rah "way, path" and dān "one who knows", meaning "one who knows the way".

Two western Jewish historians, Cecil Roth and Claude Cahen, have suggested a connection to the name of the Rhône River valley in France, which is Rhodanus in Latin and Rhodanos (Ῥοδανός) in Greek. They claim that the center of Radhanite activity was probably in France as all of their trade routes began there.

English-language and other Western sources added the suffix -ite to the term, as is done with ethnonyms or names derived from place names.

== Activities ==
The activities of the Radhanites are documented by Ibn Khordadbeh – the postmaster, chief of police (and spymaster) for the province of Jibal, under the Abbasid Caliph al-Mu'tamid – when he wrote Kitab al-Masalik wal-Mamalik (Book of Roads and Kingdoms), in about 870. The Radhanites are otherwise not attested. Ibn Khordadbeh described the Radhanites as sophisticated and multilingual. He outlined four main trade routes used by the Radhanites in their journeys; all four began in the Rhone Valley in southern France and terminated on China's east coast. Radhanites primarily carried commodities that combined small bulk and high demand, including spices, perfumes, jewelry, and silk. They are also described as transporting oils, incense, steel weapons, furs, and slaves.

=== Text of Ibn Khordadbeh's account ===
In his Book of Roads and Kingdoms (Arabic: كِتَاب ٱلْمَسَالِك وَٱلْمَمَالِك, Kitāb al-Masālik wa-l-Mamālik), Ibn Khordadbeh listed four routes along which Radhanites traveled in the following account.

These merchants speak Arabic, Persian, Roman, the Frank, Spanish, and Slav languages. They journey from West to East, from East to West, partly on land, partly by sea. They transport from the West eunuchs, female slaves, boys, brocade, castor, marten and other furs, and swords. They take ship from Firanja (France), on the Western Sea, and make for Farama (Pelusium). There they load their goods on camel-back and go by land to al-Kolzum (Suez), a distance of twenty-five farsakhs. They embark in the East Sea and sail from al-Kolzum to al-Jar and al-Jeddah, then they go to Sind, India, and China. On their return from China they carry back musk, aloes, camphor, cinnamon, and other products of the Eastern countries to al-Kolzum and bring them back to Farama, where they again embark on the Western Sea. Some make sail for Constantinople to sell their goods to the Romans; others go to the palace of the King of the Franks to place their goods. Sometimes these Jewish merchants, when embarking from the land of the Franks, on the Western Sea, make for Antioch (at the head of the Orontes River); thence by land to al-Jabia (al-Hanaya on the bank of the Euphrates), where they arrive after three days' march. There they embark on the Euphrates and reach Baghdad, whence they sail down the Tigris, to al-Obolla. From al-Obolla they sail for Oman, Sindh, Hind, and China.

These different journeys can also be made by land. The merchants that start from Spain or France go to Sus al-Aksa (in Morocco) and then to Tangier, whence they walk to Kairouan and the capital of Egypt. Thence they go to ar-Ramla, visit Damascus, al-Kufa, Baghdad, and al-Basra, cross Ahvaz, Fars, Kerman, Sind, Hind, and arrive in China.

Sometimes, also, they take the route behind Rome and, passing through the country of the Slavs, arrive at Khamlidj, the capital of the Khazars. They embark on the Jorjan Sea, arrive at Balkh, betake themselves from there across the Oxus, and continue their journey toward Yurt, Toghuzghuz, and from there to China.

== Historical significance ==
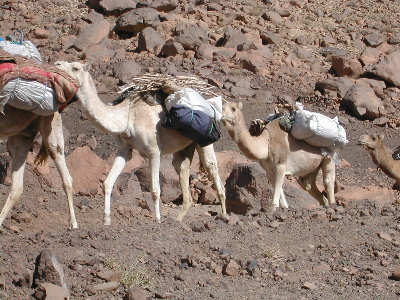
A caravan of dromedaries in Algeria. Much of the Radhanites' overland trade between Tangier and Mesopotamia was by camel.

During the Early Middle Ages, Muslim polities of the Middle East and North Africa and Christian kingdoms of Europe often banned each other's merchants from entering their ports. Privateers of both sides raided the shipping of their adversaries at will. The Radhanites functioned as neutral go-betweens, keeping open the lines of communication and trade between the lands of the old Roman Empire and the Far East. As a result of the revenue they brought, Jewish merchants enjoyed significant privileges under the early Carolingian dynasty in France and throughout the Muslim world, a fact that sometimes vexed local Church authorities.

While most trade between Europe and East Asia had historically been conducted via Persian and Central Asian intermediaries, the Radhanites were among the first to establish a trade network that stretched from Western Europe to East Asia. They engaged in this trade regularly and over an extended period of time, centuries before Marco Polo and Ibn Battuta brought their tales of travel in the Orient to the Christians and the Muslims, respectively. Ibn Battuta is believed to have traveled with the Muslim traders who traveled to the Orient on routes similar to those used by the Radhanites.

While traditionally many historians believed that the art of Chinese papermaking had been transmitted to Europe via Arab merchants who got the secret from prisoners of war taken at the Battle of Talas, some believe that Jewish merchants such as the Radhanites were instrumental in bringing paper-making west. Joseph of Spain, possibly a Radhanite, is credited by some sources with introducing the so-called Arabic numerals from India to Europe. Historically, Jewish communities used letters of credit to transport large quantities of money without the risk of theft from at least classical times. This system was developed and put into force on an unprecedented scale by medieval Jewish merchants such as the Radhanites; if so, they may be counted among the precursors to the banks that arose during the Late Middle Ages and early modern period.

Some scholars believe that the Radhanites may have played a role in the conversion of the Khazars to Judaism. In addition, they may have helped establish Jewish communities at various points along their trade routes, and were probably involved in the early Jewish settlement of Eastern Europe, Central Asia, China, and India.

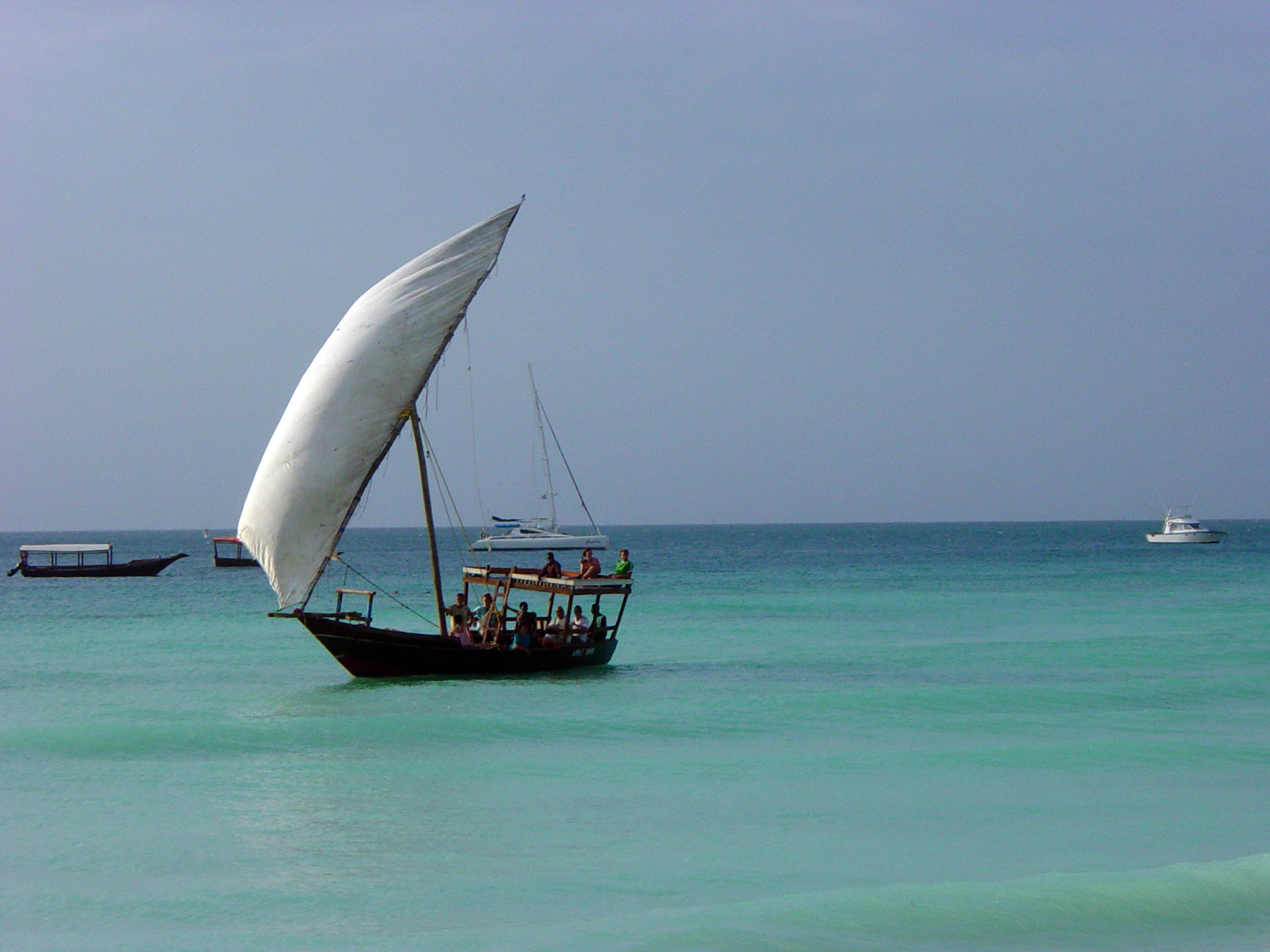
Much of the Radhanites' Indian Ocean trade was via coastal cargo ships such as this dhow.

Ibn al-Faqih's early 10th century Book of the Countries mentions them, but much of Ibn al-Faqih's information was derived from Ibn Khordadbeh's work.

== Disappearance ==
The activities of the Radhanites appear to cease during the 10th century. The causes may have been the fall of Tang China in 908, followed by the collapse of the Khazarian state at the hands of the Rus' some sixty years later (circa 968–969). Trade routes became unstable and unsafe, a situation exacerbated by the rise of expansionist Turco-Persianate states, and the Silk Road largely collapsed for centuries. This period saw the rise of the mercantile Italian city-states, especially the maritime republics, Genoa, Venice, Pisa, and Amalfi, who viewed the Radhanites as unwanted competitors.

The Radhanites had mostly disappeared by the end of the 10th century; there have been suggestions that a collection of 11th century Jewish scrolls discovered in a cave in Afghanistan's Samangan Province in 2011 may represent a remnant of Radhanites in that area.

The economy of Europe was profoundly affected by the disappearance of the Radhanites. For example, documentary evidence indicates that many spices in regular use during the early Middle Ages completely disappeared from European tables in the 10th century. Jews had previously, in large parts of Western Europe, enjoyed a virtual monopoly on the spice trade. The slave trade appears to have been continued by other agents, for example, for the year 1168, Helmold von Bosau reports that 700 enslaved Danes were offered for sale in Mecklenburg by Slavic pirates. In the Black Sea area, slave trade appears to have been taken over by the Tatars, mostly selling enslaved Slavs to the Ottoman Turks.

== See also ==
- Amber Road
- Benjamin of Tudela
- Cochin Jews
- Kaifeng Jews
- Red Jews
- Caravanserai
- Eldad ha-Dani
- History of the Jews in China (The Kaifeng Jews originated from the Tang dynasty period)
- History of the Jews in pre-18th-century Poland
- Jews of Bilad el-Sudan
- Joseph Rabban
- Petachiah of Ratisbon
- Trade route from the Varangians to the Greeks
- Trans-Saharan trade
- Volga trade route
- Gentlemen of the Road (2007 Novel by Michael Chabon)

== Notes ==
1. Gil 299–328.
2. Enc. of World Trade, "Radhanites" 763–4
3. Bareket 558–560.
4. Gil 299–310.
5. That is, the language of the Byzantine Empire, Greek.
6. It is unclear to what specific language Ibn Khordadbeh refers. The word "Firanj" can be used to mean "Frank" and thus most likely the language referred to is either the Vulgar Latin dialect that ultimately evolved into French or the Germanic language originally spoken by the Franks, called Old Frankish by linguists. However, in the Middle Ages Firanj was a generic term used by Arabs (and Eastern Christians) for Western Europeans generally. It is possible that Ibn Khordadbeh uses "Frank" as a counterpoint to "Roman" (Byzantine Greek), indicating that the Radhanites spoke the languages of both Eastern and Western Christians.
7. Though some, such as Moshe Gil, maintain that "Firanja" as used in this context refers to the Frankish-occupied areas of Italy, and not to France proper. Gil 299–310.
8. Adler 2–3; for alternative translations see, e.g., De Goeje 114; Rabinowitz 9–10; Among the minor differences between the accounts is Rabinowitz's rendering of "Khamlif" in place of "Khamlidj" and his reference to the "Yourts of the Toghozghuz" as opposed to Yurt and Toghuzghuz as separate entities. Rabinowitz's version, translated, means "Tents of the Uyghurs". See also Dunlop 138, 209, 230.
9. Bendiner 99–104.
10. See, e.g., Enc. of World Trade, "China".
11. e.g., Enc. of World Trade, "Radanites" 764.
12. Adler x.; Weissenbron 74–78; see also Encyclopedia of World Trade — From Ancient Times to the Present , "Radanites" 764.
13. Antiquities 18.6.3
14. Rabinowitz 91.
15. e.g., Enc. of World Trade, "Radanites" 764; see also Pritsak 265.
16. Brook 71; Gil 2004 625–626.
17. Rabinowitz 150–212.
18. Shefler, Gil "Scrolls raise questions as to Afghan Jewish history", The Jerusalem Post, Jerusalem, 2 January 2012.
