= Guangzhou massacre =

9th century massacre in the Tang dynasty

- Location: Guangzhou, China
- Date: 878–879
- Deaths: Tens of thousands 200,000 according to al-Mas'udi
- Perpetrator: Huang Chao's rebel army

The Guangzhou massacre or Qinzhou massacre was a massacre of the inhabitants of the prosperous port city of Guangzhou or Qinzhou in 878–879 by the rebel army of Huang Chao. Arab sources indicate that foreign victims, including Jews, Christians, and Zoroastrians, numbered in tens of thousands based on Chinese records of prior inhabitants. Two travellers from the Abbasid Caliphate, Abu Zayd al-Sirafi writing decades afterwards, and al-Masudi writing in the 10th century, estimated that 120,000 or 200,000 foreigners were killed respectively, but according to Morris Rossabi, the numbers were inflated.

In the early 870s, drought and famine in Henan led to widespread banditry. In 874, the bandits rebelled under Wang Xianzhi in Changyuan, Henan and ravaged the region between the Changjiang and Yellow River. When Wang died in 878, he was succeeded by Huang Chao, a failed examination candidate from a wealthy salt trading family.

In 878 AD after Huang Chao's forces pushed into southern China, they arrived at the gates of Khanfu (Guangzhou). According to the Arab writer Abu Zayd Hasan ibn Yazid al-Sirafi, the presence of Muslims, Jews, and Christians came to an end when the Tang rebel, Huang Chao, occupied Khanfu from 878 to 879. In addition, he mentioned the "al-Qazzu" (a mulberry tree) were ruined by Huang Chao's army.

At first the citizens of Khanfu held out against him, but he subjected them to a long siege-this was in (877–878) until, at last, he took the city and put its people to the sword. Experts on Chinese affairs reported that the number of Muslims, Jews, Christians, and Zoroastrians massacred by him, quite apart from the native Chinese, was 120,000; all of them had gone to settle in this city and become merchants there. The only reason the number of victims from these four communities happens to be known is that the Chinese had kept records of their numbers.

— Abu Zayd al-Sirafi

According to Shine Toshihiko, Khanfu is misidentified as Guangzhou due to a misunderstanding of pronunciation and there are other reasons to suspect that the massacre did not take place at Guangzhou. The year given by al-Sirafi does not match the year Huang Chao captured Guangzhou and there is no record of the massacre in Chinese records. The word Khānfū is spelled as خانفو in Arabic, but the contemporary reading of it would have been Khampu rather than Khanfu, matching with the pronunciation of Qinzhou at that time as khâm-phủ.

== See also ==
- Yangzhou massacre
- List of massacres in China
- Racism in China
- Xenophobia

== Bibliography ==
- Mackintosh-Smith, Tim (2014), Two Arabic Travel Books, Library of Arabic Literature
- Tackett, Nicholas (2014), The Destruction of the Medieval Chinese Aristocracy, Harvard University Asia Center
- Xiong, Victor Cunrui (2009), Historical Dictionary of Medieval China, United States of America: The Scarecrow Press, ISBN 978-0-8108-6053-7
