= Ishaq al-Mawsili =

Arab musician of Persian origin (767 772 – 850)

- Born: 767/772; Ray or Arrajan, Abbasid Caliphate
- Died: March 850; Baghdad, Abbasid Caliphate
- Occupations: Composer; singer; music theorist
- Parent: Ibrahim al-Mawsili

Ishaq al-Mawsili (Persian: اسحاق المصلی; 767/772 – March 850) was a Persian musician active as a composer, singer and music theorist. The leading musician of his time in the Abbasid Caliphate, he served under six successive Abbasid caliphs: Harun al-Rashid, Al-Amin, Al-Ma'mun, Al-Mu'tasim, Al-Wathiq and Al-Mutawakkil. The caliphs and Abbasid court held him in high regard, and his diverse intellect elevated him to a social status that was highly unusual for musicians of the time.

Taught by his renowned father Ibrahim al-Mawsili, the singer Atika bint Shuhda and the noted lutenist Zalzal, he succeeded his father in leading the conservative musical establishment. This put him at odds with progressive musicians such as Ibrahim ibn al-Mahdi and Ziryab, whose style later dominated in popularity. He has appeared in the Maqamat of Al-Hariri of Basra and One Thousand and One Nights. His creation of a comprehensive theoretical system for Arab music, without Ancient Greek influence, would retain relevance into at least the 14th century, when it was championed by Ibn Kurr.

== Life and career ==
=== Early life ===
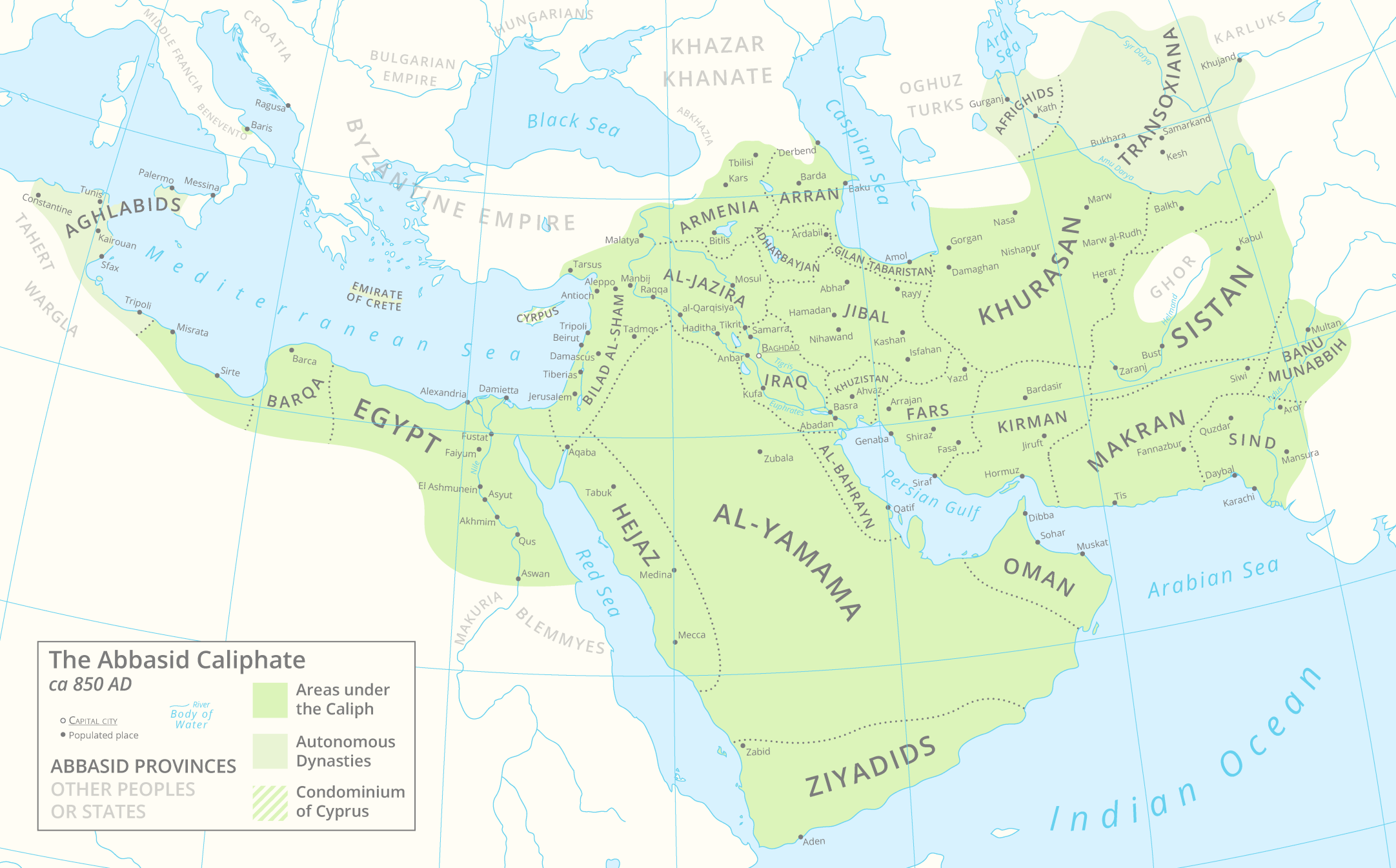
The Abbasid Caliphate in c. 850

Modern sources vary on the exact location and birthdate of Ishaq al-Mawsili. The scholar Everett K. Rowson (in Encyclopædia Iranica) and the musicologist Eckhard Neubauer (in Grove Music Online and Encyclopædia Iranica) record 767–768 and 767 respectively (150 AH), while the musicologist Owen Wright (in the Encyclopaedia of Islam) records 772 (155 AH). With similar contradiction, Rowsen and Wright state that he was born in Ray, while Neubauer records Arrajan, though he includes '?', noting uncertainty on the matter. Ishaq's father Ibrahim al-Mawsili, a Persian, received Persian musical training in Ray. Ibrahim met and married Ishaq's mother Šāhak, before the family moved to Abbasid capital of Baghdad. The capital was previously Damascus and had only recently become Baghdad upon the Abbasid dynasty's ascendancy; such a shift towards Persia was reflected in the Abbasid society, and Ibrahim was among the many emerging prominent Persian intellectuals of the Caliphate. (Note: Later examples of emerging Persian intellectuals in the Abbasid Caliphate include Muhammad ibn Zakariya al-Razi and Al-Farabi.) Ibrahim found considerable acclaim and patronage in the capital, serving under three successive Abbasid caliphs: Al-Mahdi, Al-Hadi and Harun al-Rashid.

The success of his father allowed Ishaq to be raised "among the cultured elite", being given a comprehensive education in both music and the Islamic sciences. His teachers included the noted literary scholars Abu Ubaidah and Al-Asmaʿi. Ishaq attended a high level of skill in poetry, primarily using traditional styles. He was "known for his scholarly prowess", particularly his knowledge of philology and jurisprudence (fiqh). The caliph Al-Ma'mun would later permit him to attend court sessions with literary and legal scholars, rather than musicians, in light of his intellect. Al-Ma'mun would also remark that he would have, in the words of Wright, "appointed him qadi [a judge] had he not already been known as a musician". Ishaq's importance, however, lies chiefly with his musical contributions. His principal teachers were his father Ibrahim and the noted lutenist Zalzal, who was a student of his father. Ishaq would later declare that Zalzal to be the most outstanding lutenist of his time. The singer Atika bint Shuhda was also his teacher, and purportedly taught Ishaq one or two pieces each day for seven years.

=== Musical career ===
In a career of over 40 years, Ishaq became both a leading court musician and companion to six caliphs: Harun, Al-Amin, Al-Ma'mun, Al-Mu'tasim, Al-Wathiq and Al-Mutawakkil. He was given additional patronage by viziers and other important figures of the Abbasid court. On one occasion Abu al-Faraj al-Isfahani records that Ishaq identified a single mistuned string upon listening to twenty ouds simultaneously. Also according to al-Isfahani, he was inspired by the Sasanian musician Barbad, and often told friends a story of Barbad being able to play a song on his barbat lute, even though a jealous rival had mistuned all of his strings. Among Ishaq's students was 'Alī ibn Yaḥyā al-Munajjim (died 888)—the father of poet and music theorist Abu Ahmad Monajjem—who wrote a book on Ishaq al-Mawsili. The geographer Ibn Khordadbeh is also said to have been his student, as Khordadbeh's father Abdallah ibn Khordadbeh was a friend of Ishaq's.

Like his father Ibrahim al-Mawsili, Ishaq al-Mawsili led a conservative musical faction, upholding the classical traditions of Hejaz. This put him in opposition with the progressive musical ideology led by Ibrahim ibn al-Mahdi, who was joined by Ziryab, a pupil of Ibrahim al-Mawsili. An Abbasid Prince, Ibrahim was "portrayed as a champion of greater freedom of expression" and noted for his musical innovations which often employed Persian aesthetics. Both musicians supposedly had a lengthy correspondence, recorded by al-Isfahani. Contemporary sources frequently comment on the rivalry between Ishaq and Ibrahim and agree on Ishaq's musical preeminence, particularly as an instrumentalist and composer. Ishaq was celebrated for his technique, command of repertoire and musical ear, and according to al-Isfahani he once purposefully played an out of tune oud to show up Ibrahim. Contemporary sources relay that Ishaq had an unattractive singing voice, and in this he was surpassed by Ibrahim ibn al-Mahdi, who was famous for his tone and vocal range of four octaves. To make up for his poor natural voice, Ishaq may have sung in falsetto, a technique that commentators such as al-Isfahani credit him with introducing. Despite Ishaq's greater renown, Rowson notes that "it seems clear that the future lay with [Ibrahim]"; Ishaq's colleagues Allawayh al-Asar (Alluyah) and Mukhariq eventually joined Ibrahim's faction.

By the time of Al-Wathiq (r. 842–847) Ishaq had ceased music composition, though he was still active as a performer. In his later years he gradually became blind and died in Baghdad on March 850 (235 AH). Some of his descendents were musicians, including Hammad ibn Ishaq al-Mawsili and Ahmad ibn Muhammed ibn Ismail ibn Ibrahim al-Mawsili, both great-grandsons of Ibrahim al-Mawsili.

== Music and writings ==
Later sources credit Ishaq with the composition of 200 to 400 songs as well as poetry numbering 50 folios, though all of it is lost.

Ishaq is credited with creating a theoretical system for Arab music, with—according to Neubauer—no knowledge of theory behind Ancient Greek music. His writings purportedly included around 40 books on music, though none have survived. Among these was the Kitab al-aghani al-kabir (Great Book of Songs) which became the primary source for Abu al-Faraj al-Isfahani's work of the same name. (Note: Al-Isfahani's work also included a substantial biography on Ishaq and an overview of his compositions.) Al-Isfahani, along with the scholar Abu l-Hasan ibn al-Munajjim discussed Ishaq's theoretical system in their works.

== Legacy ==
A diversely educated individual, Ishaq exemplified the "cultivated musician-courtier" of his time by having considerable ability in the variety of disciplines in addition to music. Yet his reputation and historical importance centers solely around his music. Into the 12th century, Ishaq's theories were applied in Muslim-ruled Spain; the remained relevant up to at least the late 14th century, when the theorist Ibn Kurr reputedly championed them.

He is featured prominently in the music treatise of Ibn al-Tahhan (fl. first half of the 11th century), Hawi al-funun wa-salwat al-mahzun (Compendium of the arts to comfort sad hearts), and far more than many of al-Tahhan's contemporaneous musicians. Ishaq appears in tales from the Maqamat of Al-Hariri of Basra and One Thousand and One Nights.
