= Allawayh al-Asar =

9th century Singer of Abbasid era (b. 800–d. 854)

Allawayh al-Asar (Arabic: علوية الأعسر) (or Alluya)
- Occupation: Singer
- Years active: c. 800–854
- Known for: Singer at the Abbasid court of Harun al-Rashid and his successors

Allawayh al-Asar (Arabic: علوية الأعسر) (or Alluya; flourished c. 800–854) was a singer of Sogdian origin at the Abbasid court of Harun al-Rashid and his successors.

His grandfather, a captive from Sogdia, was a "freedman" (mawla) in Umayyad times. Allawayh al-Asar was a student of Ibrahim al-Mawsili; in contemporaneous sources, he, Ishaq al-Mawsili (son of Ibrahim al-Mawsili) and Mukhariq were often mentioned together.

Allawayh was fond of the style introduced by Ibrahim ibn al-Mahdi, and, according to D. M. Dunlop: "Perhaps we are to see in his introduction of Persian elements into the old Arabic music some indication of national preference". However, by the following century, according to the Kitab al-Aghani, the so-called "traditionalist views" of Ishaq al-Mawsili "held the field". Despite his initial allegiance to Ishaq's conservative musical traditions, Allawayh eventually joined the progressive musical faction of Ibrahim ibn al-Mahdi.

== Sources ==
- Dunlop, D. M. (1985). "ʿALAWAYH". In Yarshater, Ehsan (ed.). Encyclopædia Iranica. Vol. I/8: Alafrank–Alp Arslan. London and New York: Routledge & Kegan Paul. p. 804. ISBN 978-0-71009-097-3.
- Rowson, Everett K. (1998). "Esḥāq Mawṣelī". In Yarshater, Ehsan (ed.). Encyclopædia Iranica. Vol. VIII/6: Eršād al-zerāʿa–Eʿteżād-al-Salṭana. London and New York: Routledge & Kegan Paul. pp. 596–597. ISBN 978-1-56859-055-4.
