= Salakanagara =

Mythological kingdom

The Salakanagara Kingdom is a mythical Indianised kingdom in Western Java that supposedly existed between the second and third centuries CE.

Salakanagara is thought to refer to a location named Argyre in Claudius Ptolemaeus's Geographia, which places Argyre on an island called Iabadiou.

The main source for Salakanagara's history is the manuscript Pustaka Rajya-rajya I Bhumi Nusantara, composed in 17th century by a council led by Prince Wangsakerta of Cirebon, and a few Chinese records. Because the existence of the kingdom could not be verified from inscriptions, archaeological remains, literary works, or contemporary foreign chronicle, modern historians consider the manuscript to be unreliable, and as a result the kingdom is considered mythical.

== See also ==
- Tarumanegara
