= Mukhariq =

Singer of the Early Abbasid era

Mukhariq Abu’l-Muhannāʾ Mukhāriq ibn Yaḥyā ibn Nāwūs
- Born: Madma or Kufa, Abbasid Caliphate
- Died: 845/846; Samarra, Abbasid Caliphate
- Resting place: Samarra
- Occupation: Arabic Singer of the Abbasid court
- Years active: 800–844/5
- Era: Islamic Golden Age (Early Abbasid era)

Abu’l-Muhannāʾ Mukhāriq ibn Yaḥyā ibn Nāwūs (Arabic: أبوالمهنى مُخارق بن يحيى) (fl. ca. 800–844/5), was one of the most distinguished singers of the Abbasid period, and a protege of the Barmakids and the caliphs from Harun al-Rashid to al-Wathiq.

== Life ==
He was born in Madma (although some sources claim Kufa), and was the son of a butcher. He was a slave of the famous singer Atika bint Shuhda, who at an early age first noticed his talent and trained him. She then sold him to the great court musician Ibrahim al-Mawsili, who appreciated his talent, completed Mukhariq's education and considered him as his successor. Mukhariq entered the court circles after Ibrahim sent him to entertain the powerful Barmakids with some of Ibrahim's newest compositions. The Barmakids were so enthusiastic about his performance, that Ibrahim made a gift of him to al-Fadl ibn Yahya al-Barmaki, who then gifted him to the Caliph Harun al-Rashid (r. 786–809). The Caliph was also impressed by Mukhariq, granting him his freedom and showing him his favour by gifts and tokens of esteem, such as allowing him to sit on the same seat as he, or disposing of the curtain that usually separated the court musicians from the caliphal presence. Mukhariq continued to enjoy caliphal favour by Harun's heirs until his death in 844/5. Following the death of his erstwhile master Ibrahim al-Mawsili, and Ibn Jami, by the time of al-Ma'mun (r. 813–833) Mukhariq was easily the most pre-eminent singer of his day, rivalling as a musician the Abbasid prince Ibrahim ibn al-Mahdi, Ishaq al-Mawsili (son of Ibrahim), and Alluya.

Mukhariq ascribed to a school, begun by Ibrahim ibn al-Mahdi and much in vogue at the time, whereby he altered the notes or the rhythm of a song at every performance. This reportedly disappointed Caliph al-Wathiq (r. 842–847), who was himself a composer, when he was asked to perform one of the Caliph's compositions. Later authors in the Kitab al-Aghani and the Iqd al-farid rejected this school, and considered it to have caused the loss of traditional Arabic music. Despite such criticism, Mukhariq enjoyed a firm reputation as one of the best singers of his time, with the quality of his voice being known to captivate audiences. According to the 15th-century historian Ibn al-Taghribirdi, for instance, while Ibrahim and Ishaq al-Mawsili "sang well to the accompaniment of the lute, in pure vocal work Mukhariq outshone them both". Such was his eminence that the 10th-century scholar al-Farabi only mentions two musicians of the entire Abbasid period, Muhkariq and Ishaq al-Mawsili.

Mukhariq himself had several pupils, the best known being Ahmad ibn Abdallah Abi'l-Ala, and Hamdun ibn Isma'il ibn Dawud al-Katib, the patriarch of a family of musicians.

== Sources ==
- Farmer, H. G. (1993). "Muk̲h̲āriḳ". In Bosworth, C. E.; van Donzel, E.; Heinrichs, W. P. & Pellat, Ch. (eds.). The Encyclopaedia of Islam, Second Edition. Volume VII: Mif–Naz. Leiden: E. J. Brill. p. 518. doi:10.1163/1573-3912_islam_SIM_5469. ISBN 978-90-04-09419-2.
