= Atika bint Shuhda =

Arabic female poet, musician and singer of Abbasid period

Atika bint Shuhda عاتكة بنت شُهدة
- Occupations: Arab poet, singer, musician, composer
- Writing career
- Language: Arabic
- Period: Islamic Golden Age (Abbasid era)

Atika bint Shuhda (Arabic: عاتكة بنت شُهدة) was an 8th-century Arabian Qiyan musician, composer, singer and poet.

She was born in Medina, but settled in Basra. She was the daughter of Shuhda, a female professional singer and mourner from Mecca who was herself a slave-singer for the Umayyad caliph al-Walid II ibn Yazid (r. 743–744). Atika was particularly noted for her ability as a lute-player, and was described by Ishaq al-Mawsili (d. 850) as the most skilled oud player he had ever heard. She is also known for setting lyrics by Umar ibn Abi Rabi'ah to music. Atika also acted as the instructor of other slave singers, and is known as the teacher of the notable musicians Ishaq al-Mawsili and Mukhariq ibn Yahya.
