= Chryse and Argyre =

Legendary islands in Greek mythology

Chryse and Argyre (/ˈkraɪsiː/ and /ˈɑːrdʒəriː/) were a pair of legendary islands, located in the Indian Ocean and said to be made of gold and silver. They took their name from the Greek words for gold (chrysos) and silver (argyros).

Chryse generally refers to the Golden Chersonese, an island or peninsula in Southeast Asia. Argyre is a city located on the island of Iabadiou.

Pomponius Mela in his work mentioned both islands. Adding that: "according to the old writers, the first island has golden soil, while the other silver. Furthermore, as appears to be the case, either the name derives from the reality or the tale from the designation."

In Book 6, chapter 23 of his Natural History, concerning the regions near the Indus River, Pliny the Elder (23–79 CE) wrote that "Beyond the mouth of the Indus are the islands of Chryse and Argyre, abounding in metals, I believe; but as to what some persons have stated, that their soil consists of gold and silver, I am not so willing to believe that."

Gaius Julius Solinus mentioned the islands in his work Polyhistor. He also mentioned that many people recorded that the islands were so rich in metals that their soils were gold and silver.

Some five or six centuries later, in section XIV.vi.11 of his encyclopedic Etymologies, Isidore of Seville (c. 560–636) repeated much the same information: "Chryse and Argyre are islands situated in the Indian Ocean, so rich in metal that many people maintain these islands have a surface of gold and silver; whence their names are derived." This was almost certainly taken—like much else in the Etymologies, as Isidore freely admitted—directly from the Natural History. Both of these Latin works, the Naturalis Historia and especially the Etymologiae, were widely read in Europe throughout the Middle Ages and this ensured the survival of the legend of the Gold and Silver Islands until the beginning of the Age of Discovery.

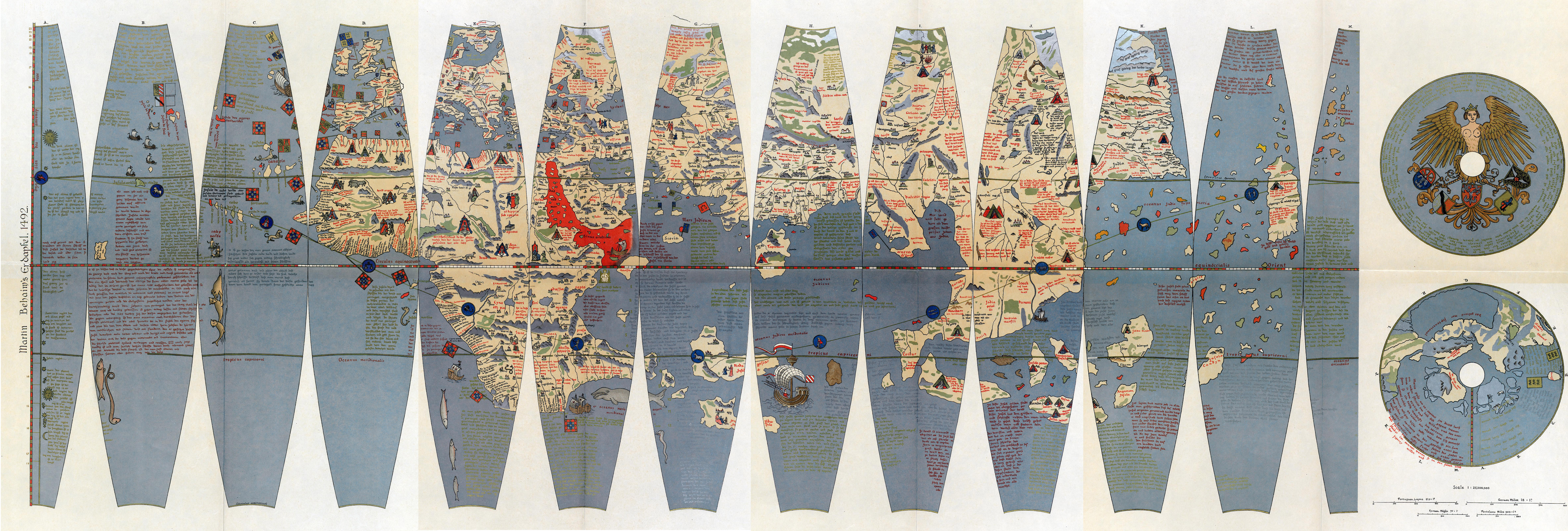
A modern facsimile of Martin Behaim's 1492 Erdapfel map. Chryse and Argyre are in the same map section as Cipangu (Japan) on the right, with Chryse just to the west of its southern tip, labelled Crisis and colored yellow-brown; Argyre is to the southwest of Chryse, labelled Argire and colored white. Note the absence of the Americas.

As European geographers gathered more reliable information about the Indian Ocean, the purported location of Chryse and Argyre shifted further and further east to the fringes of the known world. By the time Martin Behaim created his Erdapfel globe in 1492, the islands were thought to be near Japan, possibly because Marco Polo had claimed Japan itself (which he called Cipangu) to be rich in gold and silver; Behaim is known to have used both Pliny and Marco Polo as sources. Another proposed location was the Kingdom of Salakanagara on Java, based on the fact that Salakanagara means "island of silver" in Sanskrit.

The discovery of the Americas changed everything. European explorers in search of fabled lands of gold now sailed west for El Dorado instead of east to Cipangu. The works of Isidore of Seville fell out of fashion and the islands of Chryse and Argyre slowly faded from the popular imagination.

== Ramayana Mythology ==
The story of the presence of gold and silver in an island called Yavadvipa can be traced back to the story of the Ramayana, written around 8th to 4th century BC, long before Claudius Ptolemy wrote Geographike Hyphegesis. In the mythology written by Valmiki, it is told that Sugriwa sent his men to Yavadvipa to look for Sita, as can be found in Ramayana, Kanda Kishkindha, sarga 40, verses 30:

yatnavanto yavadvīpam sapta rājya upaśobhitam;

suvarṇa rūpyakam dvīpam suvarṇa ākara maṇḍitam.

Translation:

you strive hard in the Yavadvipa which splendorous with seven kingdoms [islands];

that Golden-Silver islands are enwreathed with gold-mines.

The Dindorf edition of Stephanus Byzantinus (4 volumes) contains annotation from Lucas Holstenius in the second volume, Abraham Berkelius in the third volume, and Thomas de Pinedo in the fourth volume. Berkellius state that Ἰαβαδίου (Iabadiou) come from the word "iaba" which means "barley". Biegman in Hikajat Tanah Hindia (The Tale of Hindia Land) argue that yava or iaba means "jali" (Melayu) or "job's tear" (in English). As for the word "diu", Berkelius said for Persians and Indians there is nobody who does not know that "diu" denotes dvipa (island). So Iabadiou was a transliteration of Yavadvipa. But, as for Pinedo said "It was not easy for me to believe that gold and silver only belong to them".

== Aftermath ==
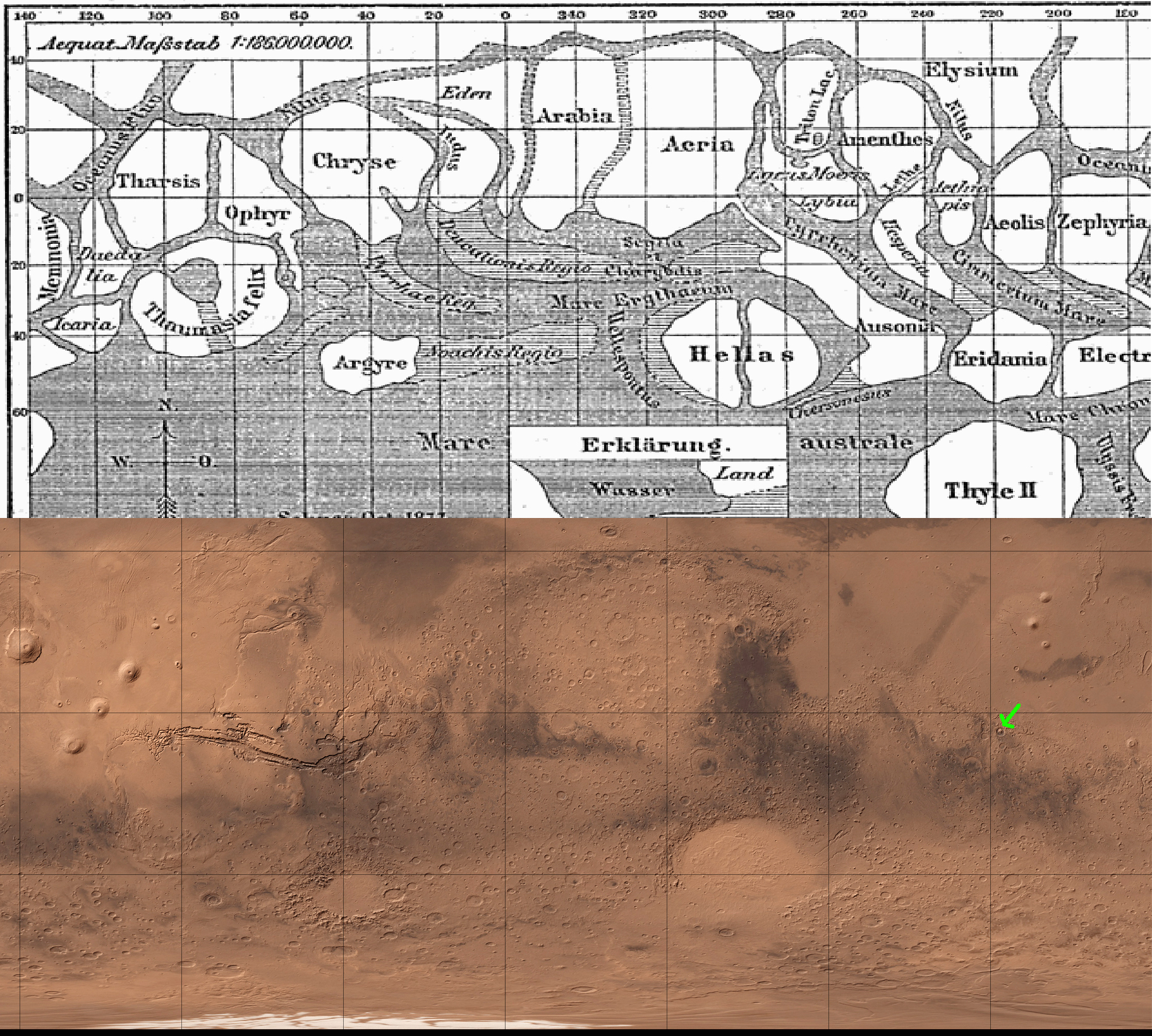
Schiaparelli's 1877 map matched with the actual surface of Mars as seen from orbit by Mariner 9. Chryse and Argyre are left of centre.

In 1877, Chryse and Argyre were recalled to life by the astronomer Giovanni Schiaparelli, who used the planetary opposition of that year to begin mapping the planet Mars. As an expert in ancient astronomy and geography, he was very familiar with classical legends and fabled lands and used them to name the features he could see through the telescope. He assumed that dark areas might be low flat "seas", as they are on the Moon, while "land" would be lighter. In particular, he noted several light patches that he took to be islands; he named the most striking circular one Hellas (for Greece) and two others Chryse and Argyre.

It was only with the observations made from Martian orbit by Mariner 9 in 1972 that it became clear these light areas were not islands, but depressions carpeted with light windblown dust. Chryse is really a low flat plain, but the name has been kept and it is now known as Chryse Planitia, "Chryse Plain". Argyre (like Hellas) is, in fact, a broad impact crater and is now Argyre Planitia, "Argyre Plain", which in turn has given its name to one of the cartographic quadrangles of the Martian atlas.
