= Al-Wakwak =

Island in medieval Arabic imaginative geography

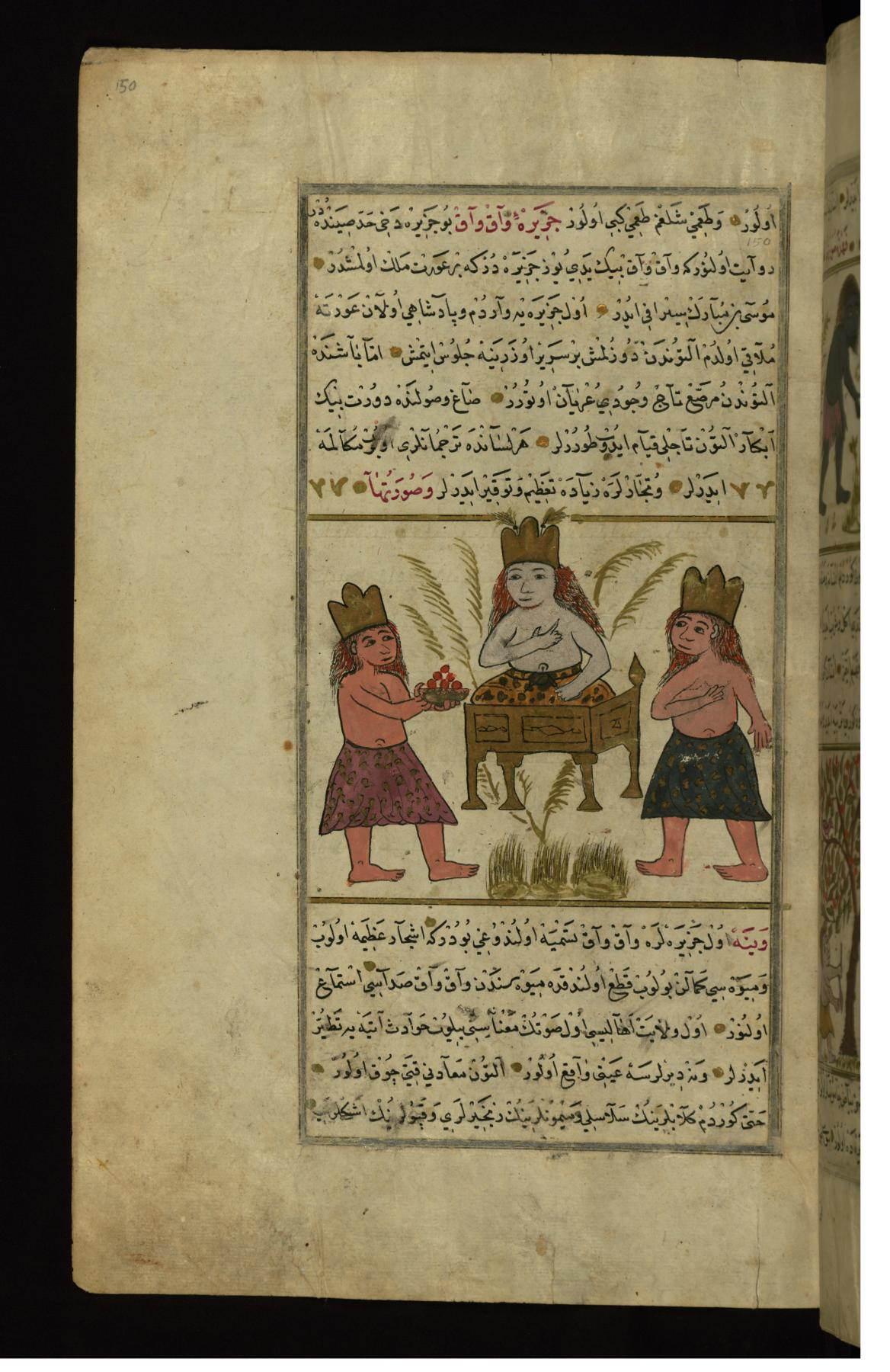
The Queen of the island of Waqwaq, folio from Walters manuscript W.659

Al-Wakwak (Arabic: ٱلْوَاق وَاق al-Wāq Wāq), also spelled al-Waq Waq, Wak al-Wak or just Wak Wak, is the name of an island, or possibly more than one island, in medieval Arabic geographical and imaginative literature.

== Identification ==
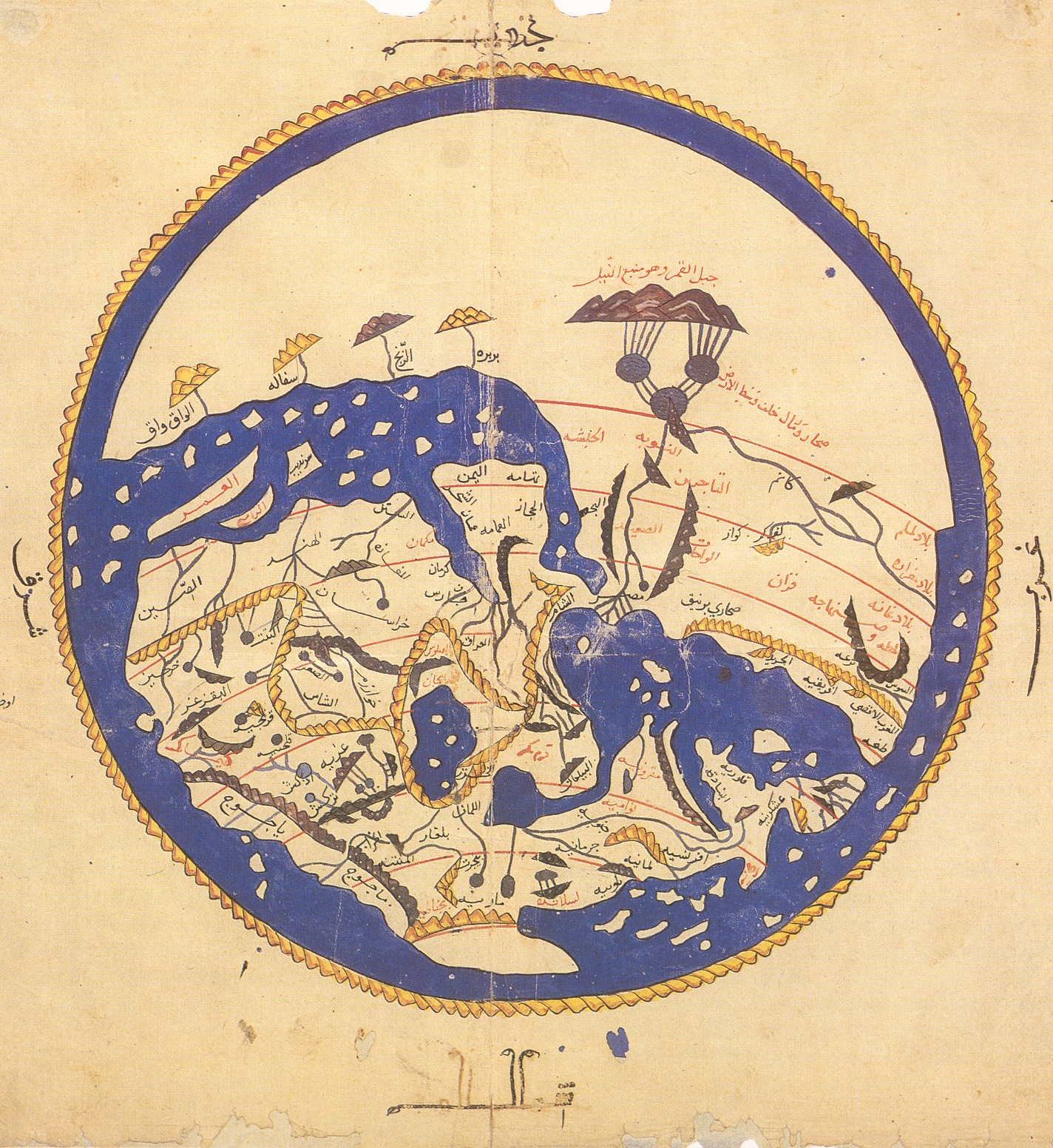
Al-Idrisi's world map from 1154. Al-Waqwaq is shown in the southeast near the left-hand side of the map, near present-day Madagascar.

Derived ultimately from a conflation of medieval Persian and Qur'anic sources, including descriptions of the mythical island of Waq-waq inhabited by half-plant/half-animal creatures, this painting depicts a plant that brings forth animal life in multiple forms. Early 1600s, Mughal India. Cleveland Museum of Art.

Wakwak is referred to in a number of sources; it is generally an island far away.

In Persian classical texts, one of the names used for Japan is "Vāq Vāq," derived from Middle Chinese wa kwək (倭國).

In Arab versions, the famous island of Waq-Waq is located in the China Sea. A queen rules the island and the population is entirely female: it is usually illustrated in al-Qazvini manuscripts of the Wonders of Creation showing the queen surrounded by her female attendants.

Ibn Khordadbeh mentions Waqwaq twice:

East of China are the lands of Waqwaq, which are so rich in gold that the inhabitants make the chains for their dogs and the collars for their monkeys of this metal. They manufacture tunics woven with gold. Excellent ebony wood is found there.

Gold and ebony are exported from Waqwaq.

The Suma Oriental of Tomé Pires mentioned that the people of Java have "many fine hounds with collars and rings of gold and silver", matching ibn Khordadbeh description of Waqwaq. Michael Jan de Goeje offered an etymology that interpreted it as a rendering of a Cantonese name for Japan. Gabriel Ferrand identified it with Madagascar, Sumatra or Indonesia. Tom Hoogervorst argued that the Malagasy word vahoak, meaning "people, clan, tribe", is derived from the Malay word awak-awak, "people, crew". Ann Kumar agrees with Hoogervorst, and identifies Wakwak as Indonesia, and argued the possibility of ancient Indonesian attack on Africa's east coast.

The tenth-century Arab account Ajayib al-Hind "Marvels of India" by Buzurg ibn Shahriyar gives an account of invasion in Africa by people called Wakwak or Waqwaq, probably the Malay people of Srivijaya or Javanese people of Mataram kingdom, in 945–946 AD. They arrived in the coast of Tanganyika and Mozambique with 1000 boats and attempted to take the citadel of Qanbaloh, though eventually failed. The reason of the attack is because that place had goods suitable for their country and for China, such as ivory, tortoise shells, panther skins, and ambergris, and also because they wanted slaves from the Bantu peoples (called Zeng or Zenj by Arabs, Jenggi by Javanese). The existence of black Africans was recorded until the 15th century in Old Javanese inscriptions and the Javanese were still recorded as exporting black slaves during the Ming dynasty era. According to Waharu IV inscription (931 AD) and Garaman inscription (1053 AD), the Mataram kingdom and Airlangga's era Kahuripan kingdom (1000–1049 AD) of Java experienced a long prosperity so that it needed a lot of manpower, especially to bring crops, packings, and send them to ports. Labor was imported from Jenggi (Zanzibar), and possibly Pujut (Australia), and Bondan (Papua). According to Naerssen, they arrived in Java by trading (bought by merchants) or being taken prisoner during a war and then made slaves.

The full transcription of the Wakwak account in Ajayeb al-Hind is as follows:

Ja'far bin Rasid, known under the name of Ibn Lakis, a noted pilot for the gold countries, has related to me some extraordinary matters concerning the Wakwak of which he was himself witness. In the year 334 A.H. (A.D. 945) the Wakwak set out with a thousand ships to launch a determined attack upon the town of Kanbaloh. But they were unable to capture it, for the town was strongly fortified and was surrounded by an arm of the sea, in the midst of which Kanbaloh rose like a fortress. People of the country, with whom the intruders held parley, demanded why they had come to Kanbaloh rather than to any other place; they replied that it was because the country possessed merchandise of value in the Wakwak country and in China, such as ivory, tortoise shell, panther skins and ambergris, and also because they wanted to obtain some of the Zenj people, who, being strong men, are able to stand heavy labour. Their voyage, said they, had lasted a year. They had pillaged several islands at six days' sail from Kanbaloh, and afterwards many towns and villages of the Zenjs in the Sofala country, without reckoning we know not what. If the story told by these people be true in speaking of a voyage of a year's duration, this proves ... that Ibn Lakis is right when he maintains that the Wakwak Islands are situated opposite to China.

— Buzurg ibn Shahriyar, Ajaib al-Hind

The writer says that the inhabitants of Waqwaq are numerous in number, and some of them resemble the Turks in appearance. They are the most industrious of all Allah’s creatures but are said to be treacherous, cunning and lying.

== The waqwaq tree ==
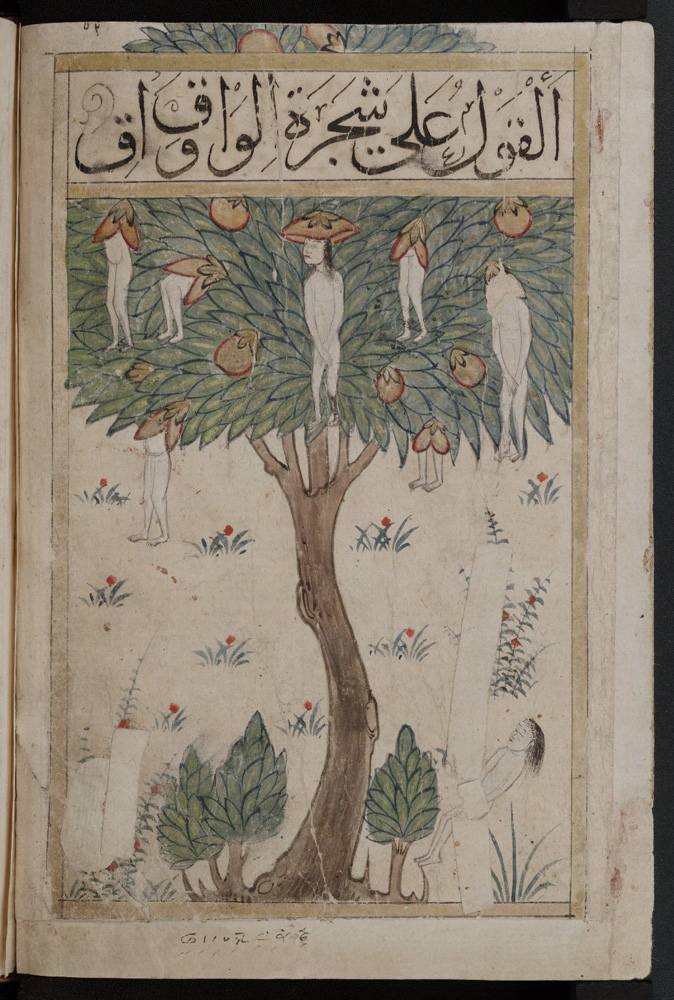
Waqwaq tree illustration, Book of Wonders (14th century manuscript) by Abu l-Hasan al-Isfahani

In the Book of Wonders, the painting titled the "Tree of Waq Waq" is rather extraordinary because it illustrates how the all-female population reproduces and self-perpetuates. Female figures grow from the tree as if they mature like fruit until they are ripened and they drop to the ground emitting a cry that sounds like 'Waq Waq!'

An Andalusi version mentions beautiful women as the fruit of the tree.

Mauny thinks this may be the pandanus, called Bakkuwan by the Batak peoples of Indonesia and grown in Madagascar, where it is called Vakwa.

The Tongdian, an 8th century Chinese encyclopedia by Du Huan, mentions an Arab account of a tree growing little children.

== See also ==
- Zabag, another Arabic word for a kingdom or an island in Indonesia
- Jinmenju, a tree in Chinese and Japanese folklore that bears fruit in the shape of human heads.
- Nariphon, a tree in Buddhist mythology that bears fruit in the shape of young female creatures.
- Zaqqum, a tree in Jahannam, the fruits of which are shaped like the heads of devils.
- Çınar incident, a rebellion in the Ottoman Empire; called Vakʿa-ı Vakvakiye "The Event of the Wakwak" for the number of people hanged from trees.
