= Abdallah ibn Khordadbeh =

Persian general and governor for Abbasid Caliphate

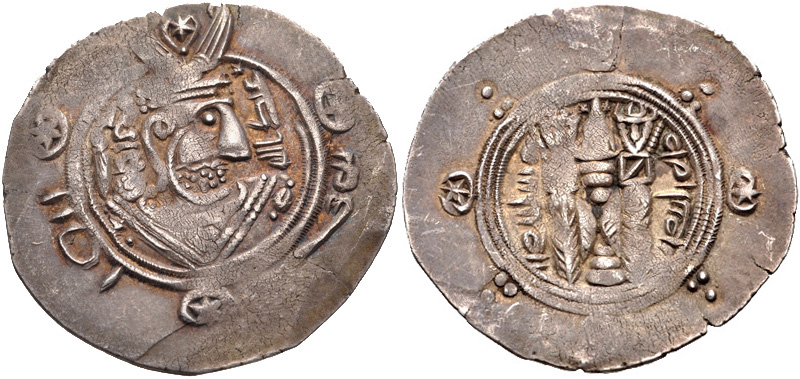
Coin struck in the name of Abdallah.

Abdallah ibn Khordadbeh (Persian: عبدالله بن خرداببه) was a Persian general and governor for the Abbasid Caliphate.

He was the son of Khordadbeh, a Zoroastrian from Khurasan who converted to Islam. By ca. 815, Abdallah served as the governor of Tabaristan, and conquered the mountainous regions of Tabaristan from the local Bavandid ruler Sharwin I. During the same year, he campaigned in Daylam, where he conquered two cities and captured its ruler Abu Layla. In 817, he aided Mazyar, an Iranian prince, to escape from Tabaristan and reach the court of the Abbasid caliph al-Ma'mun. Abdallah was also a friend of the Persian musician Ishaq al-Mawsili.

Not much more is known about Abdallah; he had a son named Abu'l-Qasim Ubaydallah, better known as Ibn Khordadbeh, who was born in 820 in Khurasan and was later raised in Baghdad, where Abdallah probably then resided. He thereafter disappears from sources, and later died at an unknown date in the 9th-century.

== Sources ==
- Bosworth, C. E, ed. (1989). The History of al-Tabari Vol. 32: The Reunification of the 'Abbasid Caliphate: The Caliphate of al-Ma'mun A.D. 813-833/A.H. 198-218. Albany, NY: State University of New York Press. ISBN 9780887060571.
- Bosworth, C. Edmund (1997). "EBN ḴORDĀḎBEH, ABU'L-QĀSEM ʿOBAYD-ALLĀH". Encyclopaedia Iranica, Vol. VIII, Fasc. 1. London et al.: C. Edmund Bosworth. pp. 37–38.
