= Al-Hanaya =

Iraqi town

Al-Hanaya is a town in Iraq, on the Euphrates River. It was mentioned as one of the cities frequently visited by Radhanite merchants.
