= Ziryab =

9th-century musician and poet

- زرياب
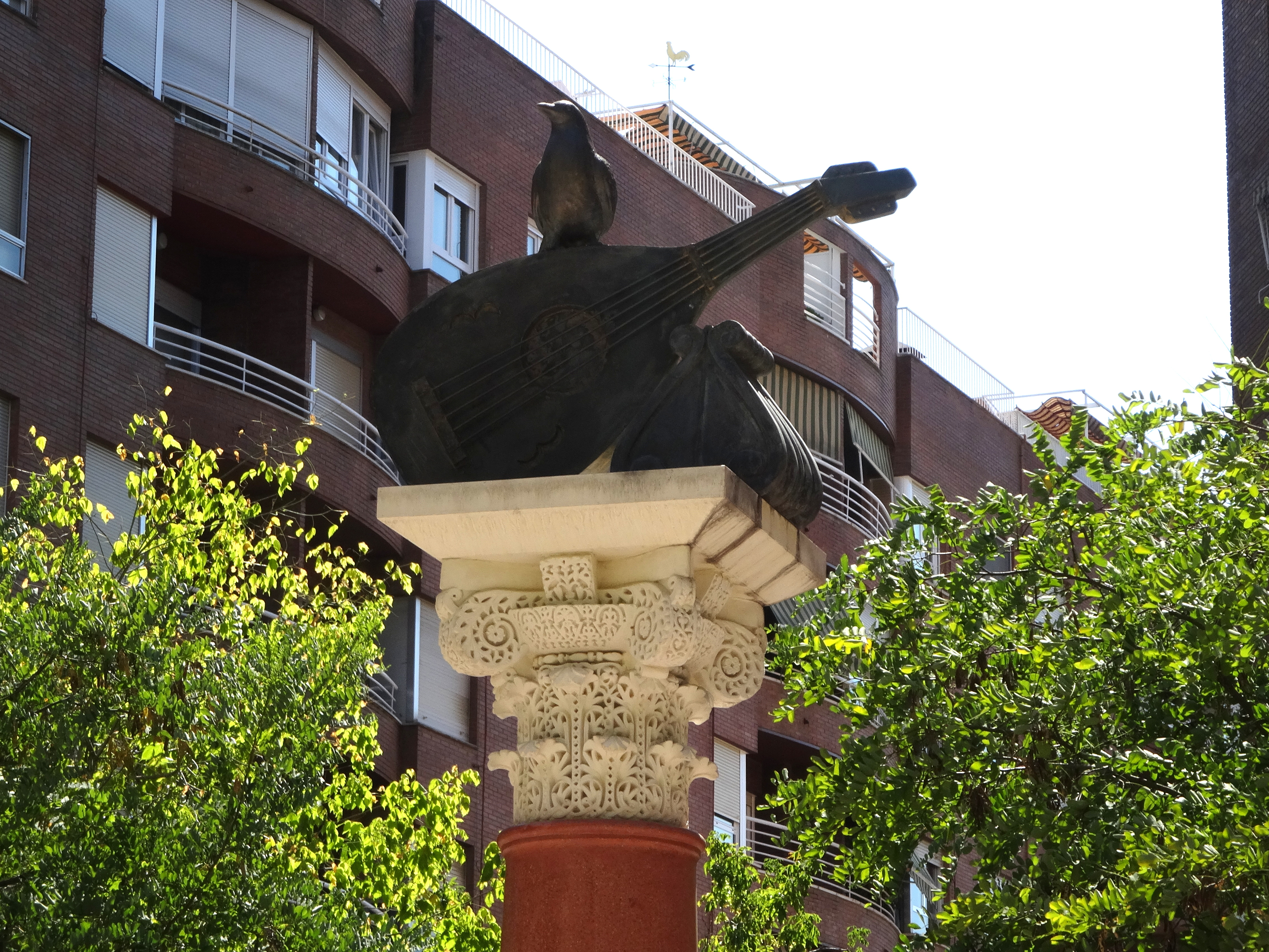
- Monument of Ziryab represented as a blackbird in Córdoba, Spain

Personal details
- Born: Abu al-Hasan 'Ali Ibn Nafi (Arabic: أبو الحسن علي بن نافع) c. 789 In the area of modern day Iraq, possibly Baghdad, Abbasid Caliphate
- Died: c. 27 January 857 (aged 67–68) Córdoba, Emirate of Córdoba
- Occupation: linguist, geographer, poet, chemist, musician, singer astronomer, gastronomist, etiquette and fashion advisor

Abu al-Hasan 'Ali Ibn Nafi' (Arabic: أبو الحسن علي ابن نافع, زریاب; c. 789–c. 857), commonly known as Ziryab, was a singer, oud and lute player, composer, poet, and teacher. He lived and worked in what is now Iraq, West Asia, and Andalusia during the medieval Islamic period. He was also a polymath, with knowledge in astronomy, geography, meteorology, botanics, cosmetics, culinary art, and fashion.

His nickname, "Ziryab", comes from the Persian and Kurdish word for Blackbird. زرياب, pronounced "Zaryāb". He was also known as Mirlo (again meaning 'blackbird') in Spanish. He was active at the Umayyad court of Córdoba in Islamic Iberia. He first achieved fame at the Abbasid court in Baghdad, his birthplace, as a performer and student of the musician and composer Ibrahim al-Mawsili.

Ziryab was a gifted pupil of Ibrahim al-Mawsili in Baghdad, where he got his beginner lessons. He left Baghdad during the reign of the Abbasid caliph al-Ma'mun and moved to Córdoba, where he was accepted as a court musician in the court of Abd ar-Rahman II of the Umayyad dynasty.

== Early life ==
790 CE: Ziryab was most likely born in Baghdad. According to the Encyclopaedia of Islam, he was born around 175 AH/790 into a family of mawali of the caliph al-Mahdi. His ethnic origin is unclear. Based on his appearance and background, different sources suggest him to be of Persian, Kurdish, Sindi, African, or mixed Arab-African descent.

Ziryab was trained in the art of music from a young age. During that time, Baghdad was an important center of music within the Muslim world. The musician Ibrahim al-Mawsili was Ziryab's teacher.

== Career ==
813 CE: Ziryab left Baghdad during the reign of al-Ma'mun some time after the year 813. He then traveled first to Syria and then Ifriqiya (Tunisia) in Kairouan, where he lived at the Aghlabid court of Ziyadat Allah (ruled 816–837).

There are conflicting accounts of why Ziryab left the court. He may have had a falling out with Ziyadat Allah by offending him or some powerful figure with his musical talent. One account recorded by al-Maqqari says that Ziryab inspired the jealousy of his mentor by giving an impressive performance for the caliph Harun al-Rashid (d. 809), with the result that al-Mawsili told him to leave the city. Earlier, more reliable sources indicate that he outlived both Harun and his son al-Amin and left after al-Amin's death in 813.

822 CE: He was invited to Al-Andalus by the Umayyad prince, Al-Hakam I (ruled 796–822). He found on arrival in Al-Andalus that prince Al-Hakam I had died, but his son, Abd ar-Rahman II, renewed his father's invitation. He was an intimate companion of the prince. Abd al-Rahman II was a great patron of the arts and Ziryab was given a great deal of freedom. Ziryab settled in Córdoba in what is now Spain with a monthly salary of 200 gold Dinars.

== Reputation ==
Ziryab's career flourished in Al-Andalus. According to Ibn Hayyan, 'Ali Ibn Nafi' was called Blackbird because of his dark complexion, the clarity of his voice, and "the sweetness of his character."

As the Islamic armies conquered more and more territories, their musical culture spread with them, as far as western China in the east and Iberia in the west. After their 8th-century conquest of nearly all of Hispania, which they renamed Al-Andalus, the Muslims were a small minority for quite some time. Muslims were greatly outnumbered by the majority Christians and a smaller community of Jews, who had their own styles of music. Muslims and Arabs introduced new styles of music, and the main cities of Iberia soon became well-known centers for music within the Islamic world. During the 8th and 9th centuries, many musicians and artists from across the Islamic world moved to Iberia. In reputation, Ziryab surpassed them all. Al-Maqqari states in his Nafh al-Tib (Fragrant Breeze): "There never was, either before or after him (Ziryab), a man of his profession who was more generally beloved and admired".

In Cordoba, he was celebrated as the court's aficionado of food, fashion, singing, and music. He introduced standards of excellence in all these fields as well as setting new norms for elegant and noble manners. He established a school of music that trained singers and musicians and which influenced musical performance for at least two generations after him.

He is said to have created a unique and influential style of musical performance, and written songs that were performed in Iberia for generations. He was a great influence on Spanish music, and is considered the founder of the Andalusian music traditions of North Africa.

Ziryab was a "major trendsetter of his time" creating trends in fashion, hairstyles, and hygiene. His students took these trends with them throughout Europe and North Africa. Ziryab also became the example of how a courtier, a person who attended aristocratic courts, should act. According to Ibn Hayyan, in common with erudite men of his time he was well versed in many areas of classical study such as astronomy, history, and geography.

== Descendants ==
According to the main source, Ibn Hayyan, Ziryab had eight sons and two daughters. Five of the sons and both daughters became musicians of some prominence. These children kept their father's music school alive, but the female slave singers he trained also were regarded as reliable sources for his repertoire in the following generation.

== Contributions ==
=== Music ===
Ziryab is said to have improved the oud (or Laúd) by adding a fifth pair of strings, and using an eagle's beak or quill instead of a wooden pick. Ziryab also dyed the four strings a color to symbolize the Aristotelian humors, and the fifth string to represent the soul. Ziryab's Baghdadi musical style became very popular in the court of Abd al-Rahman II.

According to al-Tifashi, Ziryab appears to have popularized an early song-sequence, which may have been a precursor to the nawba (originally simply a performer's "turn" to perform for the prince), or Nuba, which is known today as the classical Arabic music of North Africa, though the connections are tenuous at best.

He established one of the first schools of music in Córdoba. This school incorporated both male and female students, who were very popular amongst the aristocracy of the time. According to Ibn Hayyan, Ziryab developed various tests for them. If a student did not have a large vocal capacity, for instance, he would put pieces of wood in their jaw to force them to hold their mouth open. Or he would tie a sash tightly around the waist to make them breathe in a particular way, and he would test incoming students by having them sing as loudly and as long a note as they possibly could to see whether they had lung capacity.

=== Fashion and hygiene ===
Ziryab started a vogue by changing clothes according to the weather and season. He suggested different clothing for mornings, afternoons and evenings. Henri Terrasse, a French historian of North Africa, commented that legend attributes winter and summer clothing styles and "the luxurious dress of the Orient" found in Morocco today to Ziryab, but argues that "Without a doubt, a lone man could not achieve this transformation. It is rather a development which shook the Muslim world in general..."

He created a deodorant to get rid of bad odors, promoted morning and evening baths, and emphasized the maintenance of personal hygiene. Ziryab is thought to have invented an early toothpaste, which he popularized throughout Islamic Iberia. The exact ingredients of this toothpaste are unknown, but it was reported to have been both "functional and pleasant to taste".

According to Al-Maqqari, before the arrival of Ziryab, men and women of al-Andalus in the Cordoban court wore their long hair parted in the middle and hung down loose down to the shoulders. Ziryab had his hair cut with bangs down to his eyebrows and straight across his forehead, "new short hairstyles leaving the neck, ears and eyebrows free,". He popularized shaving the face among men and set new haircut trends. Royalty used to wash their hair with rose water, but Ziryab introduced the use of salt and fragrant oils to improve the hair's condition. He is alleged by some to have opened beauty parlors for women of the Cordoban elite. However, this is not supported by the early sources.

=== Cuisine ===
Ziryab "revolutionized the local cuisine" by introducing new fruits and vegetables such as asparagus. He insisted that meals should be served on leathern tablecloths in three separate courses consisting of soup, the main course, and dessert. Prior to his time, food was served plainly on platters on bare tables, as was the case with the Romans.

He also introduced the use of crystal as a container for drinks, which was more effective than metal. This claim is supported by accounts of him cutting large crystal goblets.

== Other sources ==
- Encyclopaedia of Islam
- al-Muqtabis by Ibn Hayyan
- The Muqaddima of Ibn Khaldoun, Chapter V, part 31, "The craft of singing."
- Ta'rikh fath al-Andalus by Ibn al-Qutiyya
- al-'Iqd al-farid by Ibn 'Abd Rabbih
- Ta'rikh Baghdad by Ibn Tayfur
- Kitab al-Aghani by Abu l-Faraj al-Isfahani
- Tawq al-hamama by Ibn Hazm
- Jawdhat al-Muqtabis by Al-Humaydī
- Mughrib fi hula l-Maghrib by Ibn Sa'id
