= Mansour Zalzal =

Arab musician (died after 842)

Mansour Zalzal منصور زلزل
- Also known as: Zalzal
- Born: Mansour
- Died: after 842 Abbasid Caliphate
- Genres: Arab music, Zalzal
- Occupation: Musician
- Years active: 830s – 842

Manṣūr Zalzal al-Ḍārib (منصور زلزل; died after 842 CE) or simply Zalzal, was an Iranian musician during the early Abbasid period. The renowned musician Ishaq al-Mawsili was his student; he declared Zalzal to be the most outstanding lutenist of his time.

He contributed musical scales that were later named after him : the Mansouri scale, Arabic, المقياس المنصوري.

He introduced positions (intervals) within scales on the fretboard of an oud (neutral 3rd frets, between major 3rd frets and minor third frets), called wusta-zalzal.

Mansour is credited by the Encyclopedia of Islam with making improvements on the design of the barbat lute, which was then called the ūd shabbūt.
