= Ibrahim al-Mawsili =

Arab musician of Persian origin (742–804)

- Born: 742; Kufa
- Died: 804; Baghdad
- Occupations: Musician, Composer

Abū Isḥāq Ibrāhīm al-Mawṣilī (Arabic: أبو إسحاق إبراهيم الموصلي; 742–804) was an Arab musician of Persian origin who was among the greatest composers of the early Abbasid period. After Arab and Persian musical training in Ray, he was called to the Abbasid capital of Baghdad where he served under three successive Abbasid caliphs: Al-Mahdi, Al-Hadi and Harun al-Rashid. He became particularly close with the latter and emerged as the leading musician of his time. He championed the conservative school of Arab music against progressives such as Ibn Jami. His son and student Ishaq al-Mawsili would succeed him as the leader of the conservative tradition and his other pupils included the musicians Mukhariq, Zalzal and Ziryab. He appears in numerous stories of One Thousand and One Nights.

== Life and career ==
Born in Kufa, in his early years his parents died and he was trained by an uncle. After a year he went to Rayy, where he met an ambassador of the caliph al-Mansur, who enabled him to come to Basra and take singing lessons. Singing, not study, attracted him, and at the age of twenty-three he fled to Mosul, where he joined a band of wild youths. His fame as a singer spread, and the caliph al-Mahdi brought him to the court. There he remained a favorite under al-Hadi, while Harun al-Rashid kept him always with him until his death, when he ordered his son al-Ma'mun to say the prayer over his corpse.

He had many pupils, chief among them his son Ishaq al-Mawsili, the freedman slave Mukhariq, the lutenist Zalzal, as well as the musician Ziryab.

See the preface to Ahlwardt's Abu Nowas (Greifswald, 1861), pp. 13–18, and the many stories of his life in the Kitab al-Aghani, V. 2-49.

== Sources ==
Books

- Zadeh, Travis (2013). "Of Mummies, Poets, And Water Nymphs: Tracing The Codicological Limits of Ibn Khurdādhbih's Geography". In Bernards, Monique (ed.). Abbasid Studies IV: Occasional Papers of the School of 'Abbasid Studies. Exeter: Gibb Memorial Trust. ISBN 978-0-906094-98-3.

Journal and encyclopedia articles

- Fück, J. W. (1986). "Ibrāhīm al-Mawṣilī". The Encyclopedia of Islam, New Edition, Volume III: H–Iram. Leiden and New York: BRILL. doi:10.1163/1573-3912_islam_SIM_3455. ISBN 978-90-04-08118-5.
- Lawergren, Bo; Farhat, Hormoz; Blum, Stephen (2001). "Iran". Grove Music Online. Oxford: Oxford University Press. doi:10.1093/gmo/9781561592630.article.13895. ISBN 978-1-56159-263-0. (subscription, Wikilibrary access, or UK public library membership required)
  - Farhat, Hormoz (2001). "II. Classical traditions". Iran. Grove Music Online. (In Lawergren, Farhat & Blum (2001))
- Neubauer, Eckhard (2001a). "Mawṣilī, al- family". Grove Music Online. Oxford: Oxford University Press. doi:10.1093/gmo/9781561592630.article.51032. ISBN 978-1-56159-263-0. (subscription, Wikilibrary access, or UK public library membership required)
- Rowson, Everett K. (2012) [1998]. "Esḥāq Mawṣelī". Encyclopædia Iranica. Leiden: Brill Publishers.
- Schimmel, Annemarie (19 November 2019). "Islamic arts - The history of Islamic music | Britannica". Encyclopædia Britannica. Chicago: Encyclopædia Britannica, Inc. Archived from the original on 22 June 2021.
- This article incorporates text from a publication now in the public domain: Thatcher, Griffithes Wheeler (1911). "Ibrahīm Al-Mauṣilī". In Chisholm, Hugh (ed.). Encyclopædia Britannica. Vol. 14 (11th ed.). Cambridge University Press. p. 223.
- Wright, Owen (1966). "Ibn al-Munajjim and the Early Arabian Modes". The Galpin Society Journal. 19: 27–48. doi:10.2307/841911. ISSN 0072-0127. JSTOR 841911.
- Wright, Owen; Poché, Christian; Shiloah, Amnon (2001). "Arab music". Grove Music Online. Oxford: Oxford University Press. doi:10.1093/gmo/9781561592630.article.01139. ISBN 978-1-56159-263-0. (subscription, Wikilibrary access, or UK public library membership required)
  - Wright, Owen (2001a). "2. The early period (to 900 CE)". Grove Music Online. (In Wright, Poché & Shiloah (2001))
  - Wright, Owen (2001b). "3. The later Abbasids (900–1258)". Grove Music Online. (In Wright, Poché & Shiloah (2001))
- Wright, Owen (2018). "Isḥāq b. Ibrāhīm al-Mawṣilī". Encyclopaedia of Islam. Leiden: Brill Publishers.
