= Ibn Kurr =

Musical theorist (died 1357)

- Born: Cairo
- Died: 1357 CE
- Occupation: Musical Theorist
- Notable work: Ġāyat al-matḷūb fī 'ilm al-adwār wa-'l-dụrūb

Shams al-Din Muhammad ibn 'Isa ibn Hasan al-Baghdadi (Arabic: شمس الدين محمد بن عيسى بن حسن البغدادي), known as Ibn Kurr (إبن كُر) (d. 1357 CE), was a musical theorist of medieval Islam. He is the author of Ġāyat al-matḷūb fī 'ilm al-adwār wa-'l-dụrūb (The Enticing Roads to Rhythms and Modes), a work on the musicological discourse in Cairo during the first half of the 14th century CE. He was born in Cairo to an Iraqi refugee family.
