= Sulaiman al-Tajir =

9th-century merchant and writer

Sulayman al-Tajir
- Born: Siraf, modern-day Iran
- Occupations: Merchant, Traveler, Writer
- Writing career
- Language: Persian
- Period: 9th century
- Genre: Travel literature
- Notable works: Account of his voyages to India and China

Sulaymān al-Tājir (Arabic: سليمان التاجر, lit. 'Solomon the Merchant') was a 9th-century Muslim merchant, traveler and writer initially from Siraf in modern-day Iran. He traveled to India and China and wrote an account of his voyages around AD 850, often associated with a related travelogue by Abu Zayd al-Sirafi. He is mostly known for his travel to Guangzhou, Tang China, and marveled at the excellent quality of porcelain there in 851.

== Historical Accounts ==
Little is known about Sulaiman other than the fact that he was a merchant, confirmed by his second name (nickname) al-Tajir ("the merchant"). He visited India during the time of the Pala Empire, and referred to a kingdom named 'Ruhma' and attested to their military power. He has also described Mihira Bhoja. According to Sulaiman, Mihira Bhoja was a bitter enemy of "the Muslims" and maintained a large army and had a fine cavalry.

During his stay in the city of Guangzhou he noted that the Chinese used fingerprint records to maintain the identities of newly arrived foreigners, charged extortionate rates for imported goods and that the route to China by sea was dangerous due to piracy and frequent rain. He mentions that the local Muslim populace of Guangzhou had their own Mosque and bazaars. He mentioned that the Muslim community had its own Imam and Judge (appointed by Emperor Xuānzong of Tang). He also observed the manufacturing of porcelain, the granary system of Guangzhou, tea consumption and how its municipal administration functioned.

After arriving home from China with goods he landed at Basra and then traveled to Baghdad.

== See also ==
- Sino-Arab relations
- The Maritime Silk Road (film), a 2011 Iranian film based on his journey
