= Buzurg ibn Shahriyar =

Iranian explorer

Buzurg ibn Shahriyār al-Rāmhurmuzī (Persian: بزرگ بن شهریار الرام هرمزي) was a 10th-century Persian merchant captain from Ramhormoz. He penned a collection of stories in Arabic, entitled ʿAjāʾib al-Hind (Wonders of India). The latest datable story in the collection is from 953. His 134 narratives were from Muslim sailors and traders based in Siraf, Oman, Basra and elsewhere.

In this work, there are mentions of how Muslim seafarers traveled to India, Malaysia, Indonesia, China and East Africa. Various links are mentioned between the Abbasid Caliphate and Tang dynasty, China.

Ibn Shahriyār describes the islands as being inhabited by fierce cannibalistic tribes. The book also mentions an island he called Andaman al-Kabir (Great Andaman).

According to some scholars, Buzurg ibn Shahriyār is a fictional character. Apart from the attribution to him in this book, his existence is otherwise unattested. The attribution dates from the thirteenth century, long after his alleged lifetime. Recent research has shown that the book was more probably written in Cairo during the second half of the tenth century by a scholar called Abū ‘Imrān Mūsā ibn Rabāḥ al-Awsī al-Sīrāfī.
