= Book of Roads and Kingdoms (Ibn Khordadbeh) =

9th-century geography text by Ibn Khordadbeh

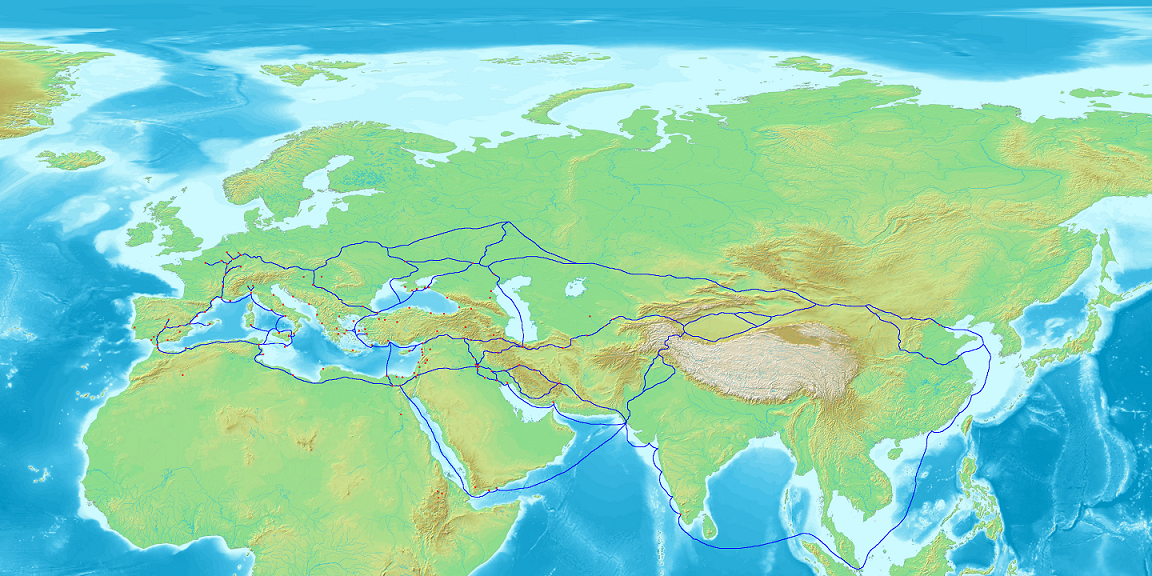
- A map of the trade network of the Radhanites, as reported in the Book of Roads and Kingdoms.
- Author: Ibn Khordadbeh
- Original title: كتاب المسالك والممالك
- Language: Arabic
- Subject: Geography
- Genre: Non-fiction
- Published: c. 870 CE
- Publication place: Abbasid Caliphate (present-day Iran)
- Media type: Manuscript

The Book of Roads and Kingdoms (Arabic: كِتَاب ٱلْمَسَالِك وَٱلْمَمَالِك, romanized: Kitāb al-Masālik wa-l-Mamālik) is a 9th-century geography text written by the Persian geographer Ibn Khordadbeh. It maps and describes the major trade routes of the time within the Muslim world, and discusses distant trading regions such as Japan, Korea, and China. It was written around 870 CE, during the reign of Al-Muʿtamid of the Abbasid Caliphate, while its author was Director of Posts and Police for the Abbasid province of Jibal in modern-day Iran.

The work uses much of the Persian administrative terms, gives considerable attention to pre-Islamic Iranian history, and uses the "native Iranian cosmological division system of the world". These all show "the existence of Iranian sources at the core of the work".

The book is also referred to in English as The Book of Roads and Provinces.
