= Abu Zayd al-Sirafi =

10th-century seafarer

- أبو زيد حسن بن زيد السيرافي
- Born: Siraf, Persia
- Occupations: Muslim traveller, sailor, geographer
- Known for: Akhbār al-Ṣīn wa’l-Hind

Abū Zayd al-Sīrāfī (full name Abū Zayd Ḥasan ibn Zayd al-Sīrāfī, أبو زيد حسن بن زيد السيرافي) was a 10th-century geographer and traveller from the Persian Gulf port of Siraf. He is well known as the author of a collection of travels and fantastic stories from the Indian Ocean, a riḥla or travelogue known in Arabic simply as Riḥlat al-Sīrāfī (al-Sīrāfī’s Travelogue), and often associated with the writings of Sulayman al-Tajir and the Akhbār al-Ṣīn wa’l-Hind (Accounts of China and India). He should not be confused with another travel writer from Siraf, Abū ‘Imrān Mūsā ibn Rabāḥ al-Awsī al-Sīrāfī, author of the Ṣaḥīḥ min akhbār al-biḥār wa-‘ajā‘ibihā (True Stories of the Seas and Their Wonders).
