= Ibn Khordadbeh =

Persian geographer and official (died 913)

- Born: 820/825 Khurasan, Abbasid Caliphate
- Died: 913
- Notable works: Book of Roads and Kingdoms
- Relatives: Abdallah ibn Khordadbeh (father)

Abu'l-Qasim Ubaydallah ibn Abdallah ibn Khordadbeh (Persian: ابوالقاسم عبیدالله ابن خردادبه; 820/825–913), commonly known as Ibn Khordadbeh was a high-ranking bureaucrat and geographer of Persian descent in the Abbasid Caliphate. He is the author of the earliest surviving Arabic book of administrative geography.

== Biography ==
Ibn Khordadbeh was the son of Abdallah ibn Khordadbeh, who had governed the northern Iranian region of Tabaristan under the Abbasid caliph al-Mamun (r. 813–833), and in 816/17 conquered the neighbouring region of Daylam, as well as repelled the Bavandid ispahbadh (ruler) Shahriyar I (r. 817–825) from the highlands of Tabaristan. Ibn Khordadbeh's grandfather was Khordadbeh, a former Zoroastrian who was convinced by the Barmakids to convert to Islam. He may have been the same person as Khordadbeh al-Razi, who had provided Abu'l-Hasan al-Mada'ini (died 843) the details regarding the flight of the last Sasanian emperor Yazdegerd III during the Arab conquest of Iran. Ibn Khordadbeh was born in 820 or 825 in the eastern province of Khurasan, but grew up in the city of Baghdad. There he received a cultivated education, and studied music with the prominent singer Ishaq al-Mawsili, a friend of his father. When Ibn Khordadbeh became of age, he was appointed as the caliphal postal and intelligence service in the central province of Jibal, and eventually in Samarra and Baghdad.

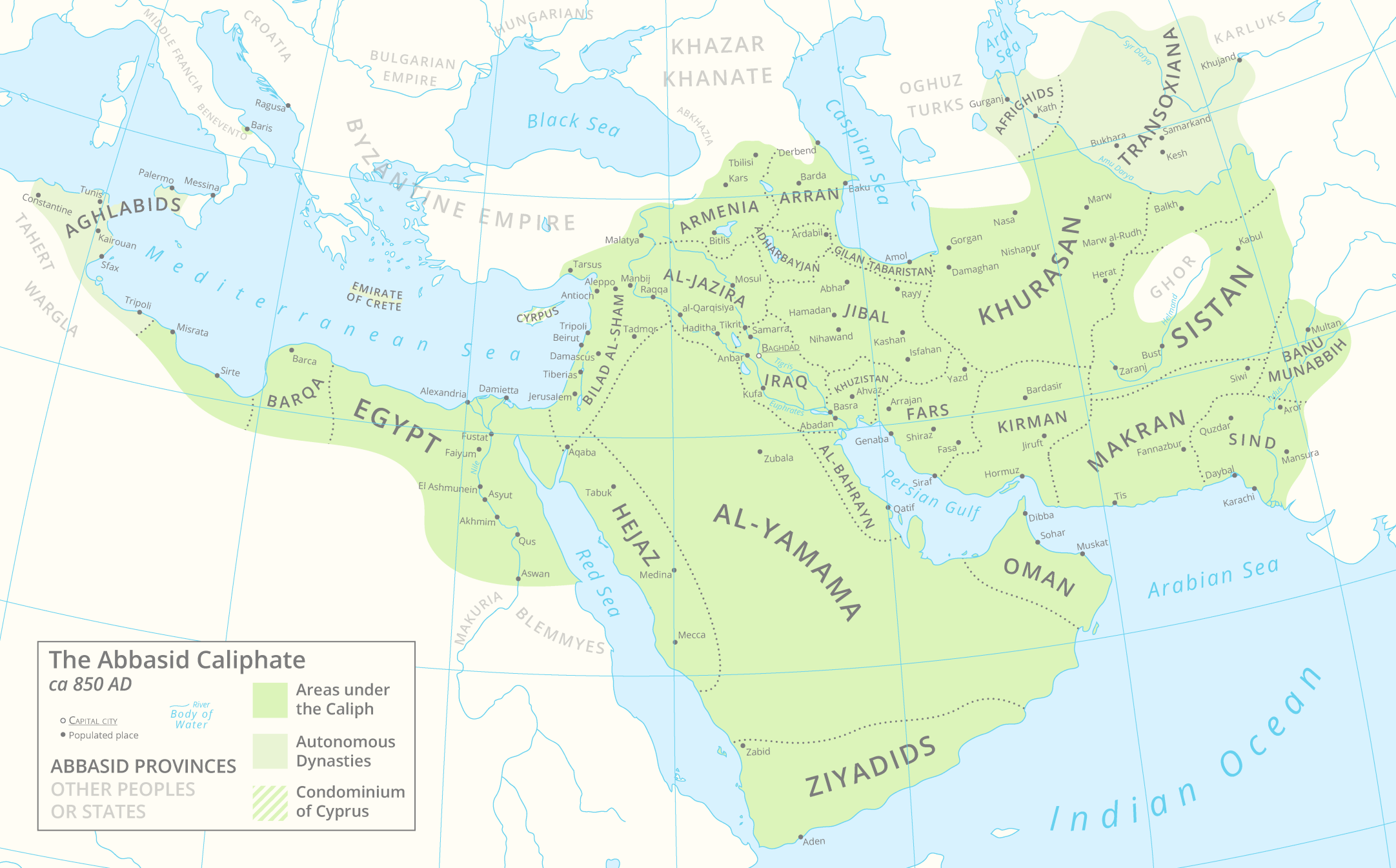
The Abbasid Caliphate in c. 850

Around 870 ibn Khordadbeh wrote Kitāb al Masālik w’al Mamālik (The Book of Roads and Kingdoms) (with the second edition of the book being published in 885). In this work, ibn Khordadbeh described the various peoples and provinces of the Abbasid Caliphate. Along with maps, the book also includes descriptions of the land, people and culture of the Southern Asiatic coast as far as Brahamputra, the Andaman Islands, peninsular Malaysia and Java. The lands of Tang China, Unified Silla (Korea) and Japan are referenced within his work. Ibn Khordadbeh described the Russians as follows: As for the Russian merchants, they are of Slavic ethnicity, they transport beaver furs, black fox furs and swords from the distant lands of the Slavs to the Greek sea, and the ruler of Byzantium charges them a tithe.

He was also one of the earliest Muslim writers to record Viking trade to the east: 'merchants called Rus traded in the Black Sea and the Caspian Sea, transporting their merchandise by camel as far as Baghdad.

Ibn Khordadbeh clearly mentions Waqwaq twice: East of China are the lands of Waqwaq, which are so rich in gold that the inhabitants make the chains for their dogs and the collars for their monkeys of this metal. They manufacture tunics woven with gold. Excellent ebony wood is found there. And again: Gold and ebony are exported from Waqwaq.

Khordadbeh wrote other books. He wrote around 8–9 other books on many subjects such as "descriptive geography" (the book Kitāb al Masālik w’al Mamālik), "etiquettes of listening to music", "Persian genealogy", cooking", "drinking", "astral patterns", "boon-companions", "world history", "music and musical instruments". The book on music had the title Kitāb al-lahw wa-l-malahi which is on musical matters of pre-Islamic Iran.

== Sources ==
- Bosworth, C. Edmund (1997). "Ebn Ḵordāḏbeh". In Yarshater, Ehsan (ed.). Encyclopædia Iranica. Vol. VIII/1: Ebn ʿAyyāš–Economy V. London and New York: Routledge & Kegan Paul. pp. 37–38. ISBN 978-1-56859-050-9.
- Meri, Josef W. (2005). Medieval Islamic Civilization: An Encyclopedia. Routledge. ISBN 9781135455965.
- Zadeh, Travis (2018). "Ibn Khurdādhbih". In Fleet, Kate; Krämer, Gudrun; Matringe, Denis; Nawas, John; Rowson, Everett (eds.). Encyclopaedia of Islam (3rd ed.). Brill Online. ISSN 1873-9830.
