= Sufism in al-Andalus =

Sufism in Spain was practiced in Al-Andalus mainly in the 9th century. Although it did not reach the extent of other lands, it would strongly influence Islam in Spain and Iberian culture in general.

== History ==
The first spread of Sufi spirituality can be traced back to Ibn Masarra (883-931), who wrote works in the line of Muʿtazilism and Batini Sufism. His text are lost and what is known about them is due mainly to the work of a later disciple, Ibn al-A'rabi (1165-1240).

The next decades saw a growth of Sufi movements in Al-Andalus, although they did not become organized in tariqa as in other lands, but in smaller groups centered around a master, without an initiation ritual and often without calling themselves Sufi. One of the first true schools formed was that of Ibn al-Arif (1088-1141), although it would be with Abu Madyan (1126-1198), who performed a synthesis of Sufi thought of his time, including Oriental, Andalusi and Magrebi, that Sufism would truly blossom in Spain. His influence was notable, having among his disciples Al-Arabi himself.

Other important Sufis of the time were Ibn Sab'in (1270), and one of his successors, the famous Andalusian poet Abu al-Hasan al-Shushtari, whose works are still in force in the Magreb.

Spanish Arabist Miguel Asín Palacios speculated that the influence of Sufi mysticism reached Christianity. As quoted by Fernando Sánchez Dragó:

Miguel Asín Palacios, a great Arabist, almost the father of Pan-Arabism, in the good sense of the word, talked about the journey and return of religious thought, of mystical though from Christianity to Christianity; he referred to how the masters of Sufism in Spain, after Islam passed through Egypt and other lands in northern Africa and contacted the Desert Fathers, the men from Alexandria, the Coptic Christians, received the esoteric message of Jesus, translated it to Islam, and then, from Islam, from Ibn-Masarra, from Muignuhdin Ibn-Al-Arabi, from other great mystical thinkers of Spanish Islam, was given back to Christianity. There would not be Juan de la Cruz, there would not be Teresa de Jesús, there would not be Miguel de Molinos, there would not be the Alumbrados, the Quietistas, the Dexados, without the precedent of these "God's madmen" who had a main role for many centuries, and specifically during the centuries of the taifa kingdoms, in that retrieval of a mysticism that came from Christianity yet was universal.

== Spanish sufis ==
- Abu al-Abbas as-Sabti (1129-1204)
- Abu Madyan de Cantiliana
- Abu l-Abbas Ibn al-Arif, Ibn al-Arif
- Abu al-Abbas al-Mursi
- Abu l-Hakam Ibn Barrajan
- Abu Marwan al-Yuhansi
- Ibn Arabi
- al-Shushtari
- Ibn al-Mar'a
- Ibn Sab'in
- Abu Ishaq al-Balafiqui
- Abu Ya'far al-Cochi
- Ibn Abbad de Ronda
- Abu Ya'far Sidibono
- Ibn Jamis
- Ibn Masarra
- Ibn al-Galib
- al-Jarrat
- Ibn Hayyan
