= Abu al-Qasim ibn Qasi =

Al-Andalus writer

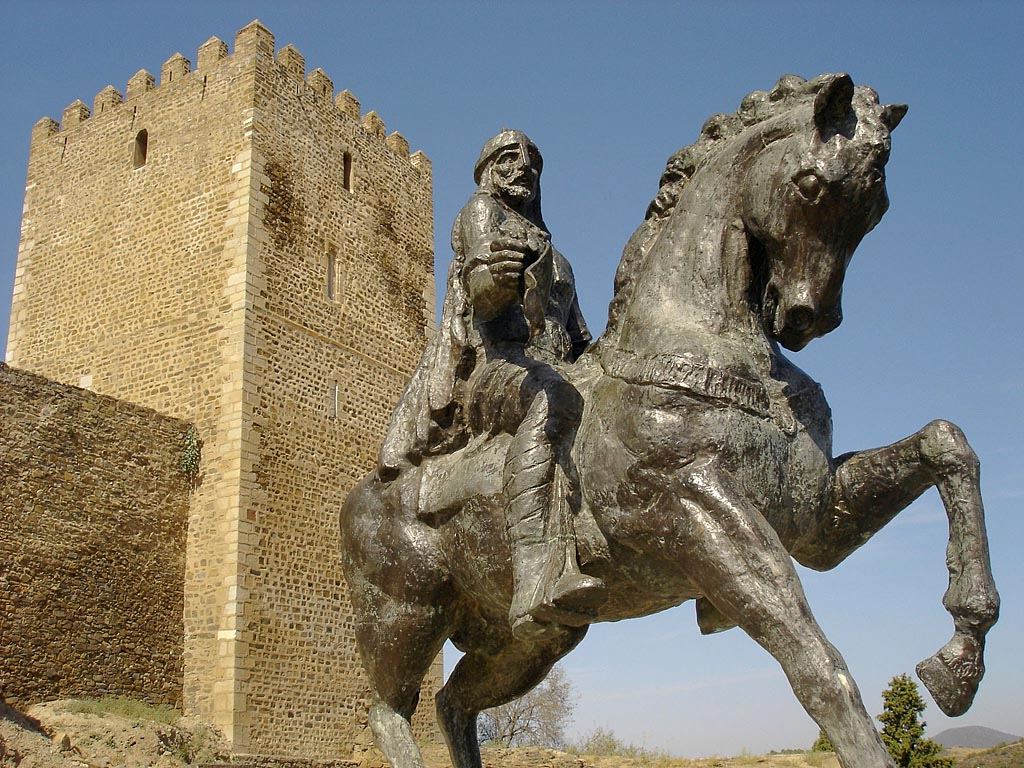
Statue of Ibn Qasi in Mértola, Portugal

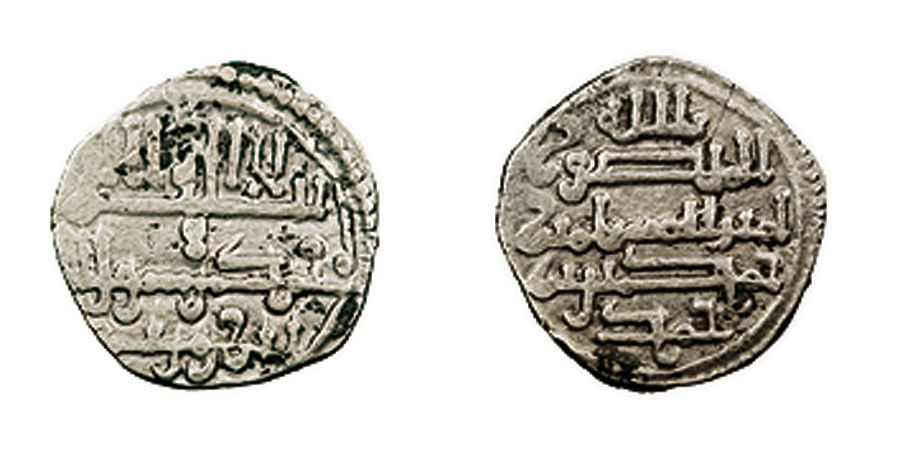
Silver coin issued by Hamdin and Ibn Wazir, allies of Ibn Qasi.

Abūʾl-Qāsim Aḥmad ibn al-Ḥusayn ibn Qasī (died 1151) was a Sufi, a rebel leader against the Almoravid dynasty in Al-Garb Al-Andalus and governor of Silves for the Almohads. The main sources for his life are Ibn al-Abbār, Ibn al-Khaṭīb and ʿAbd al-Wāḥid al-Marrakūshī. The last is the source for his biography in the biographical dictionary of al-Ṣafadī.

He was of native Iberian stock, rūmī al-aṣl in the words of Ibn al-Abbār. He was born at Silves, but the date of his birth is unknown. His name sustains the possibility that he was a descendant of the Banu Qasi, that had once staged a rebellion against the Emirate of Cordoba. According to Ibn al-Abbār, he was a minor government official at Silves, while Ibn al-Khaṭīb describes him as a spendthrift. He eventually sold all his goods, gave the money to the poor and became a murīd. He studied under Khalaf Allāh al-Andalusī and Ibn Khalīl in Niebla, although he may also have met Ibn al-ʿArīf in Almería. His main influences were the Encyclopedia of the Brethren of Purity (Ibn al-Abbār) and the works of al-Ghazālī (Ibn al-Khaṭīb).

Ibn Qasī appears to have preempted Almohad claims to messianic political rulership. He minted coins in SIlves that read "Allah is our Lord, Muhammad is our Prophet, and the Mahdi is our imam", which may have influenced the Almohads to mint similar coins, although replacing "Prophet" with "Messenger". It appears that his political theory in general attempted to merge the sufi notion of Divine closeness with political authority, both concepts referred to in Islamic language as "wilāya".

Far from the political quietism, asceticism, and mysticism of Ibn Masarra, Ibn Barrajān, and Ibn ʿArīf, was the strong esotericist revolutionary insurgent Ibn al-Qaṣī. His murīdūn revolt was able to capture, and create a city state (ṭāʾifa) in Silves. Even before his political uprising, he was known by the state-jurist establishment for sowering corruption, possessing the minds of the ignorant, claiming sainthood, the titles of Imām, and Mahdī all in effort against the state. Ibn al-Qaṣī would later join the Almohads in conquering Andalus, only to later rebel against them with the help of the Christian King of Portugal, Alfonso Henrique, which caused his own followers to behead Ibn al-Qaṣī (d. 1151), shoving his head on the very lance given to him by Henrique.

Ibn al-Qaṣī is most known for his treatise Discarding the Two Shoes and Borrowing Light from the Site of the Two Feet (Khalʿ al-naʿlayn wa iʾtibās al-nūr min mawḍiʿ al-qadamayn), which is influenced by Masarrian thought, amongst other undercurrents in Andalusia. Shaykh al-Akbar became familiar with this text, when he met Ibn al-Qaṣīʾs son in Tunis 1194. Ibn ʿArabī would later write a commentary (sharḥ) on the text pejoratively referring to Ibn al-Qaṣī as a blind follower (muqallid), an ignoramus (jāhil), an impostor, and nothing more than a transmitter of texts (nāqil); Ibn ʿArabī then goes on to elaborate on how Ibn al-Qaṣī was just parroting one of his teachers, Khalaf-Allāh, and that Ibn al-Qaṣī was not a muḥaqqiq, but rather an ignoramus. Although, Ibn ʿArabī did recognize him as a person of unveiling (kashf).

— Hamza A. Dudgeon, "The Counter-Current Movements of Andalusia and Ibn ʿArabī: Should Ibn ʿArabī be considered a Ẓāhirī", The Journal of the Muhyiddin Ibn Arabi Society Vol.64 (2018): 89-108.

== See also ==
- Muridun
- Ibn Arabi
- Ibn Masarra
- Ibn Barrajan
- Ibn al-Arif
