= Muhammad ibn Yusuf =

Muḥammad ibn Yūsuf (محمد بن يوسف) is an Arabic name that may refer to:

- Muhammad ibn Yusuf al-Thaqafi, early 8th-century governor of the Umayyad Caliphate and brother of al-Hajjaj
- Muhammad ibn Yusuf al-Kindi (897–961), Arab historian
- Muhammad ibn Yūsuf al-Warrāq (904–973/4), Andalusian historian and geographer, author of a series of historical and geographical works on North Africa
- Abu al-Hassan al-Amiri, Muhammad ibn Yusuf (died 992), Muslim theologian and philosopher who attempted to reconcile philosophy with religion
- Muhammad ibn Yusuf al-Ilaqi, eleventh-century Persian physician from Khorasan
- al-Saraqusti, Abu al-Tahir Muhammad ibn Yusuf al-Tamimi, twelfth-century Andalusi lexicographer, poet, philologist, author of the Maqāmat al-luzūmiyya
- Ibn Hud, Abu Abd Allah Muḥammad ibn Yusuf al-Judhami (died 1238), taifa emir who controlled much of al-Andalus from 1228 to 1237
- Muhammad I of Granada, Muhammad ibn Yusuf ibn Nasr (1195–1273), also known as Ibn al-Ahmar or al-Ghalib billah, first ruler of the Emirate of Granada and founder of the Nasrid dynasty
- Abu Hayyan al-Gharnati, Muhammad ibn Yusuf ibn Ali ibn Yusuf ibn Hayyan (1256–1344), Quran commentator and Arabic grammarian
- Ibn Zamrak, Muhammad ibn Yusuf al-Surayhi (1333–1393), Arab Andalusian poet and statesman from Granada (modern Spain)
- Muhammad al-Qunawi, also known as Muhammad al-Katib Sinan al-Qunawi or Muhammad ibn Yusuf (died c. 1524), Ottoman astronomer and muwaqqit (timekeeper)
- Ahli Shirazi, Muhammad ibn Yusuf (1454–1535), Persian poet
- Muhammad ibn Yusuf al-Harawi (died 1542), Persian physician from Herat (Afghanistan), author of an Arabic medical dictionary and a work on ageing
