= Murīdūn =

Sufi order in al-Andalus

The Murīdūn ("disciples") were a Sufi order in al-Andalus that rebelled against the authority of the Almoravid dynasty in 1141 and ruled a taifa based on Mértola in the al-Gharb from 1144 until 1151.

The founder and leader of the Murīdūn was Abūʾl-Qāsim Aḥmad ibn al-Ḥusayn ibn Qasī, a convert from Christianity from the city of Silves in the far west of al-Andalus. Among his followers were Muḥammad ibn ʿUmar ibn al-Mundhir, a correspondent of the esteemed Sufi teacher Ibn al-ʿArīf from Almería on the eastern coast of al-Andalus. In 1141, threatened by the rise of Sufi teaching in Almería, the Almoravid authorities arrested Ibn al-ʿArīf and his colleague Ibn Barrajān, after which the latter was imprisoned and the former set free. Ibn Barrajān, however, soon died in prison and Ibn al-ʿArīf died suddenly, poisoned it was said, in Almería. The sudden loss of the leaders of the Sufi movement in Almería, presumably at the hands of the authorities, convinced Ibn Qasī to act. He proclaimed himself imam and led his followers, the Murīdūn, into open revolt.

In the early days of the rebellion, Ibn al-Mundhir seized the city of Silves and Sīdray ibn Wazīr, the governor of Beja, went over to the rebels. Joining forces, Ibn al-Mundhir and Ibn Wazīr captured the fort of Monchique and slaughtered the Almoravid garrison. The high point of the rebellion occurred on 12 August 1144, when a force of seventy Murīdūn captured the town of Mértola, which Ibn Qasī made the capital. Yūsuf ibn Aḥmad al-Biṭrūjī, the governor of Niebla, then joined the rebels.

Now controlling Silves, Mértola, Beja and Niebla, the confident Murīdūn marched on Seville, but were defeated by the Almoravid general Yaḥyā ibn ʿAlī ibn Ghānīya. The Almoravid counter-attack was cut short by the rebellion of Ibn Ḥamdīn in Córdoba, but not before it has caused a split in the Murīdūn movement. On one side were Ibn Qasī and Ibn al-Mundhir and on the other Ibn Wazīr. In September 1145, Ibn Qasī went to Marrakesh to request support from the Almohad Caliph, a staunch enemy of the Almoravids. He returned to the Algarve in the summer of 1146 with Almohad support but refused to submit the Murīdūn to Almohad control. In order to escape his overbearing allies, he negotiated the handover of Silves to the Christians. This provoked the inhabitants of Silves, who assassinated him in his palace in August or September 1151. Ibn al-Mundhir relented and placed the city under Almohad control.

== Sources ==
- Dreher, J. (1988). "L'imamat d'Ibn Qasi á Mértola (automne 1144–été 1145): Légitimité d'une domination soufie?". Mélanges de l'Institut Dominicain d'Études Orientales. 18: 195–210.
- Goodrich, David Raymond (1978). A Sūfī Revolt in Portugal: Ibn Qasī and his Kitāb khalʿ al-naʿlayn (PhD diss.). Columbia University.
- Kennedy, Hugh (2014). Muslim Spain and Portugal: A Political History of al-Andalus. Routledge.
- Lagardère, Vincent (1983). "La tariqa et la révolte des Murîdûn en 539 H / 1144 en Andalus". Revue des mondes musulmans et de la Méditerranée. 35: 157–70.
