= Miguel Asín Palacios =

Spanish scholar of Islamic studies, Arabic language and Roman Catholic priest

The Most Excellent Miguel Asín Palacios
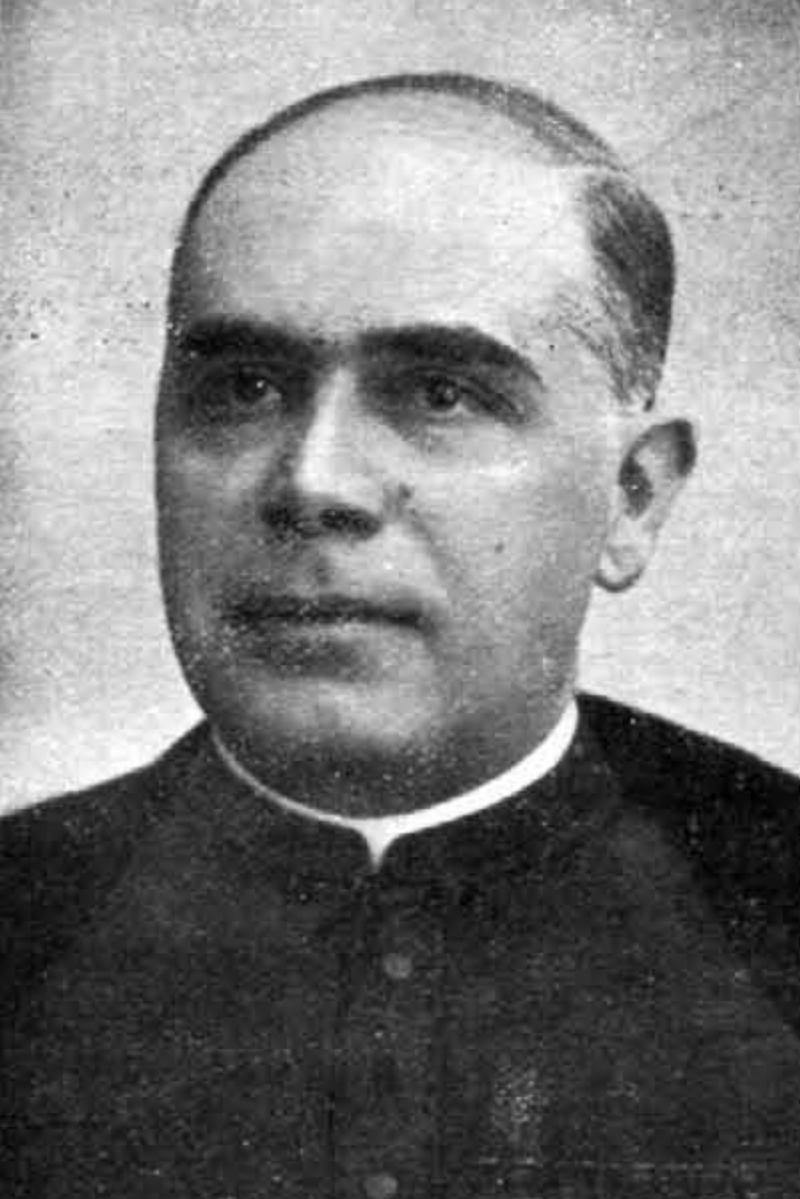
- Miguel Asín Palacios
- Born: 5 July 1871; Zaragoza, Spain
- Died: 12 August 1944 (aged 73); San Sebastián, Spain

Seat d of the Real Academia Española
- In office 26 January 1919 – 12 August 1944
- Preceded by: Enrique Ramírez de Saavedra
- Succeeded by: Dámaso Alonso

Director of the Real Academia Española
- In office 23 June 1943 – 12 August 1944
- Preceded by: Francisco Rodríguez Marín
- Succeeded by: José María Pemán

Miguel Asín Palacios (5 July 1871 – 12 August 1944) was a Spanish scholar of Islamic studies and the Arabic language, and a Roman Catholic priest. He is primarily known for suggesting Muslim sources for ideas and motifs present in Dante's Divine Comedy, which he discusses in his book La Escatología musulmana en la Divina Comedia (1919). He wrote on medieval Islam, extensively on al-Ghazali (Latin: Algazel). A major book El Islam cristianizado (1931) presents a study of Sufism through the works of Muhyiddin ibn 'Arabi (Sp: Mohidín Abenarabe) of Murcia in Andalusia (medieval Al-Andalus). Asín also published other comparative articles regarding certain Islamic influences on Christianity and on mysticism in Spain.

== Life ==
Miguel Asín Palacios was born in Zaragoza, Aragón, on 5 July 1871, into the modest commercial family of Don Pablo Asín and Doña Filomena Palacios. His older brother Luis, his younger sister Dolores, and he were little children when their father died of pneumonia. His mother the young widow continued in business with help and made ends meet with decorum but not as well as before. He attended the Colegio de El Salvador instructed by Jesuits in Zaragoza, where he began to make lifelong friendships. He entered the Seminario Conciliar, singing his first Mass at San Cayetano in Zaragoza in 1895.

At the Universidad de Zaragoza Asín had met and begun study under the Arabist Professor Julián Ribera y Tarragó. In 1896 at Madrid he defended his thesis on the Persian theologian Ghazali (1058–1111) before Francisco Codera Zaidín and Marcelino Menéndez y Pelayo. All three professors guided his subsequent studies. Asín then developed his study of Al-Ghazali, and published it in 1901. He also wrote on Mohidin Abenarabe, who is often called the leading figure in Islamic mysticism. Thus Asín was running parallel with a then European-wide effort to understand Muslim inner spirituality.

Professor Codera then retired from his chair in the Arabic Language at the Universidad de Madrid in order to create room there for Asín; Ribera in Zaragoza allowed Asín to leave to assume this Madrid cátedra in 1903. Professor Asín lived in the same well-connected boarding house as Codera, and was well received in the university. By 1905 Professor Ribera had also come to Madrid; together with Asín they soon founded the journal Cultura Española (1906–1909). Asín attended international conferences in Algeria (1905) and Copenhagen (1908), where he engaged other Arabists and academics in Islamic studies. In Madrid he continued to prosper, eventually being admitted to the royal court where he gained the friendship of Alfonso XIII. He was elected a foreign member of the Royal Netherlands Academy of Arts and Sciences in 1921.

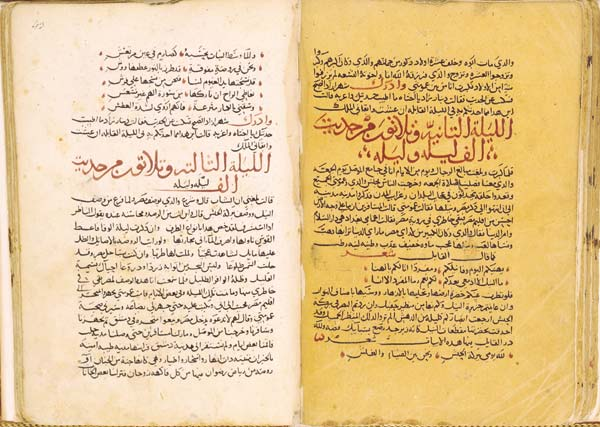

Asín, is known for his academic work concerning the medieval Muslim-Christian interface of theology, mysticism, and religious practice, with a focus on Spain. His was a form of intellectual history. Among the figures studied were Al-Ghazali, Ibn 'Arabi, Averroës (Ibn Rushd), Ibn Masarra, and Ibn Hazm, as well as the rabbi Maimonides (all from Al-Andalus except al-Ghazali). Asín did comparative work vis-à-vis Islam respecting Ramon Lull, Thomas Aquinas, Dante Alighieri, Teresa of Avila, John of the Cross, and Blaise Pascal.

Asín's manner of approach was to stick to a theme, to keep circling over it, each time adding to the understanding. His method of work involved meticulous planning, by first conceiving the order of presentation in detail, then straight ahead, without a rough draft ("sin borrador"), redacted with each reference note on its proper page.

In 1932 the journal Al-Andalus began publication under the direction of Asín Palacios; it was technically equipped to satisfy a readership of academic specialists. Asín himself was a frequent contributor. In the universities, a new generation of Spanish Arabists was emerging, such as Emilio García Gómez, influenced by Asín. In 1936 Asín was elected a Foreign Honorary Member of the American Academy of Arts and Sciences.

The Spanish Civil War began in July 1936, and caught Asín Palacios while in San Sebastián in the Basque country visiting his nephew and family. The horrors of this struggle remain very painful to contemplate with regard to both sides; over six thousand priests were assassinated by factions of the Second Spanish Republic. Asín was in personal danger, yet that September nationalist forces captured San Sebastián. During the war he taught Latin and managed to obtain photocopies of Arabic texts. After the trauma of Civil War, Asín was able to return to Madrid and resume his professorship at the university. There he continued his duties and his work on his multi-volume study of Al-Ghazali.

Don Miguel Asín Palacios had intense black eyes, fine hands; photographs did not seem to capture his personality or expressions. He was well dressed ("entre cardenal y torero"). Characterized by a preference for a tranquil working environment over professional ambition, he was regarded as a supportive and generous friend. His colleagues recognized in him an enduring innocence, so that he was "not knowing" in the mixed turbulence of the world. He projected a brightness ("diafanidad"); his mind had developed to become a great work of refinement. A pious priest, an admirer of John Henry Newman, "a child of 73 years" when he died.

He died on 12 August 1944 in San Sebastián. His passing prompted many scholars to review his work.

== Works ==
Following early publications on Al-Ghazali and Ibn 'Arabi as noted above, Asín Palacios discussed, edited and rendered into Spanish translation many Arabic writings, and composed books and essays on related themes, including an occasional piece in Latin, French, or Italian.

=== Aquinas and Averroës ===
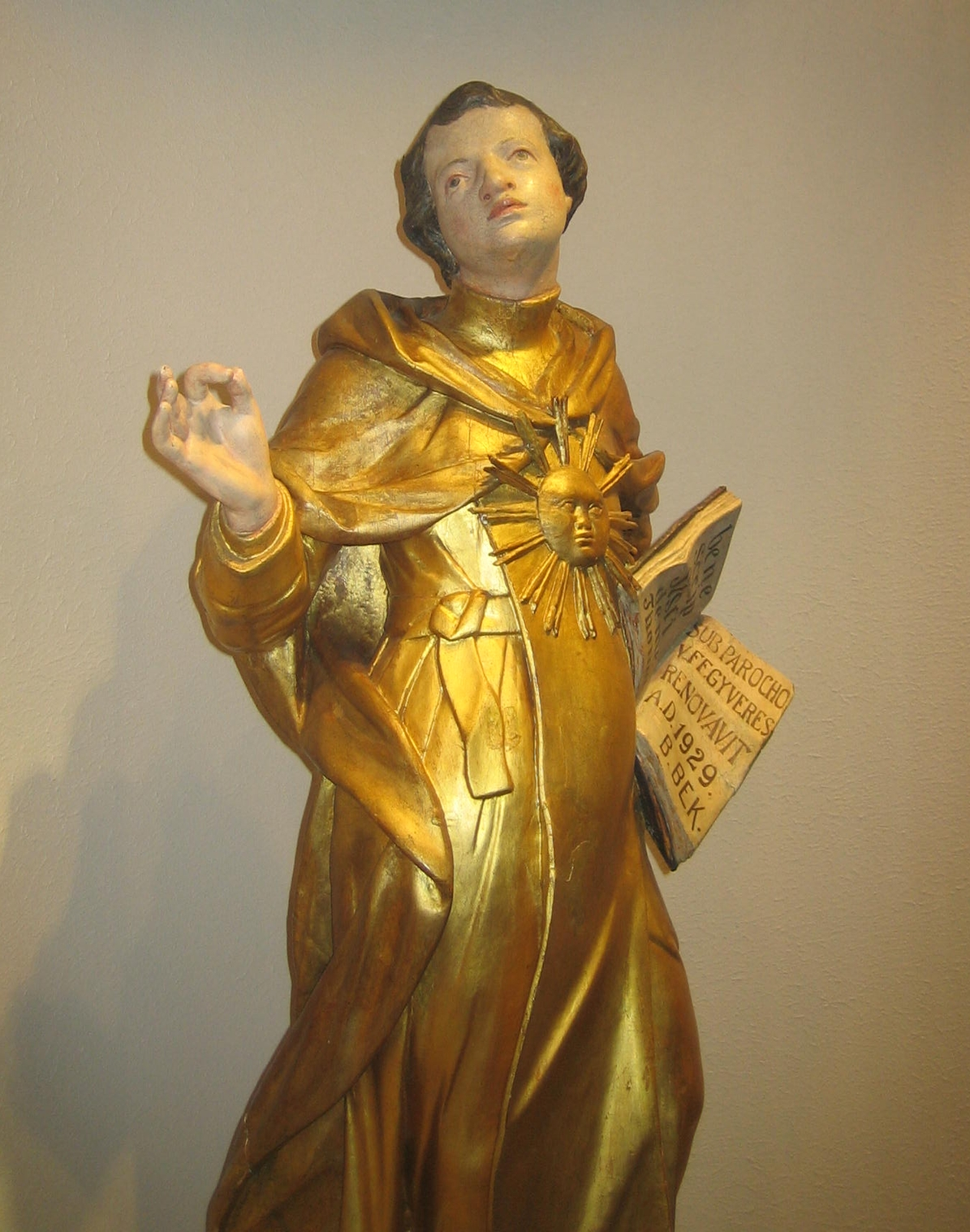
Thomas Aquinas, sculpture (17th century)

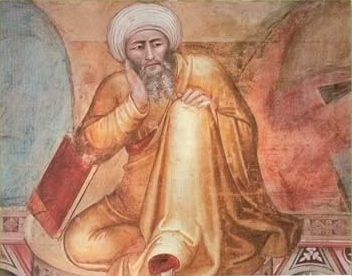
Ibn Rushd (Averroës), detail from the painting Triunfo de Santo Tomás by Andrea da Bonaiuto

Asín Palacios researched Muslim influence on Tomás d'Aquino (c. 1225–1274), which would most likely come from the philosopher Ibn Rushd of Córdoba (1126–1198), whether as protagonist or antagonist. Ibn Rushd came to be written Averroës in Latin. The result was the 1904 article, "El Averroísmo teológico de Santo Tomás de Aquino" by Asín, the professor from Zaragoza newly arrived in Madrid.

With respect to Greek philosophy, particularly Aristotle, Asín infers that the religio-philosophic world inhabited by Averroës is analogous to that of Aquinas, and also to that of ben Maimon or Maimonides (1135–1204) the Jewish philosopher and talmudist, also from Córdoba. Asín understood that it was with piety that Averroës used reason to interpret his Islamic faith, and probes this issue for the sake of clearly distinguishing Averroës from several of the not-so-pious Latin "Averroístas". Asín also refers to medieval voluntarism (called asaries in Islam), in order to contrast and distinguish the similar rationalisms held by Averroës and by Aquinas. Yet, many Thomists did not then accept without great controversy Asín's point of view.

=== Ibn Masarra ===
In his 1914 book, Abenmasarra y su escuela. Orígenes de la filosofía hispano-musulmana, Asín opens by describing the evolution of Islamic philosophy and cosmology at the center of Islamic civilization in the East, in comparison with its later emergence in Al-Andalus (Muslim Iberia). A brief biography of Ibn Masarra (883–931) follows. There Asín posits the continuation of pre-existing Iberian culture among Hispanic natives who, following its conquest, converted to Islam. Because of AbeMnmasarra's father's client status (to his Berber mawla), Asín infers that he was such a Muslim 'Spaniard' (muwallad). Asín describes his affinity to Greek philosophy, i.e., neoplatonism, then notes the accusations of heresy against him, and that he early concealed his teachings. At the time the Umayyad Emir Abdullah ibn Muhammad al-Umawi challenged by political unrest, and armed rebels such as 'Umar ibn Hafsun, showed little tolerance for religious dissenters such as Abenmasarra. Ibn Masarra felt compelled to flee, traveling to Qairawan and Mecca. He eventually returned to Córdoba under the tolerant rule of the Umayyad caliph Abd ar-Rahman III (r.889/91–961), where he founded a School with elements of Sufism.

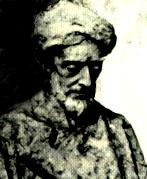
Ibn Gabirol, influenced by Ibn Masarra's school

Due to a lack of extant works by Ibn Masarra of Córdoba available to Asín, his book treats the general context of the School and teachings of early Muslim mystics in al-Andalus. Asín discusses the Batini, the Mutazili, the Shi'a, the Sufi, the Greco-Roman mystic Plotinus (205–270), and Pseudo-Empedocles in particular. Mentioned several times by Asín is a perspective he favored: eastern Christianity's early influence on the young religion before Islam's arrival in the west. Asín infers that Ibn Masarra's school influenced Ibn al-Arif (1088–1141) of Almería. This Ibn al-'Arif became the focus of an emerging Sufi circle later called the muridin. His followers spread out over al-Andalus, but they became too strong in the opinion of the governing power; they were variously suppressed by the Almoravids who then ruled al-Andalus from Marrakesh. Asín then discusses the influence of the school on Jewish figures of al-Andalus, for example, Judah ha-Levi (c. 1085 – c. 1140), and in particular on Solomon ibn Gabirol (c. 1021–1058), known in Latin as Avicebron. Ibn Gabirol wrote in Arabic the book Fons Vitae which still survives. It apparently shows clear neo-Platonic references to the school of Ibn Masarra.

Asín points to the impact of these Muslim and Jewish thinkers of Spain regarding medieval Christian theology, for example, the long drawn-out struggle between the Aristotilean ideas of Thomas Aquinas (1225–1274) and those of Duns Scotus (1266–1308). Asín's dogged research, on the persistent influence of Ibn Masarra's school of mystical philosophy, leads him to follow its tracks eventually to Ibn 'Arabi (1165–1240), as well as to Ramon Lull (1233–1315) and to Roger Bacon (c. 1214 – c. 1294). Later another scholar would find evidence that may link the school of Ibn Masarra to the philosopher of light [al-Ishraq] and mystic of Iran, Suhrawardi (c. 1155–1191). Asín's 1914 Abenmasarra y su escuela established a lasting influence on subsequent scholarship.

=== Dante Alighieri ===
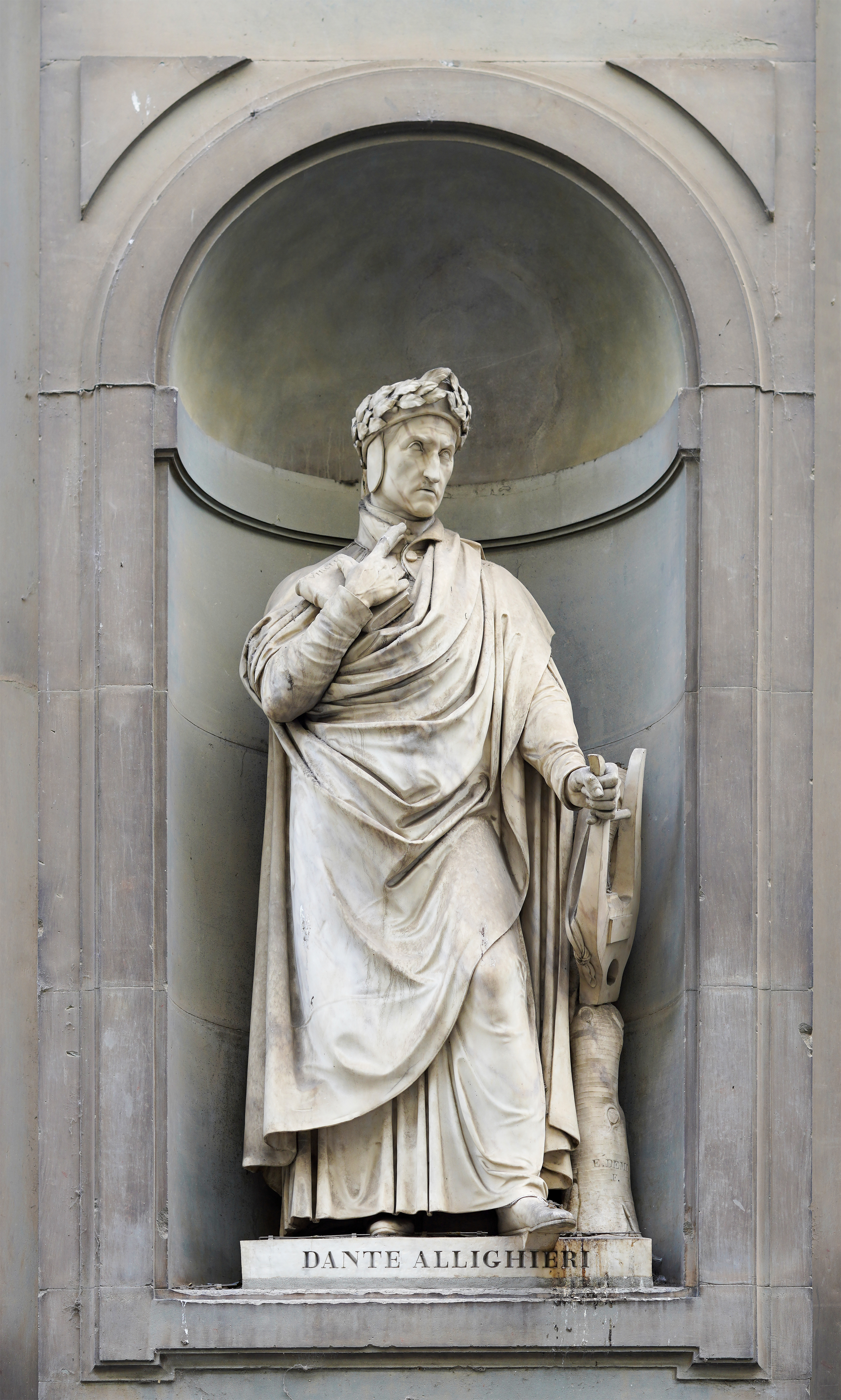
Statue of Dante Alighieri, at Palazzo degli Uffizi, Florence

Perhaps Asín Palacios is best remembered for his 1919 book, La Escatologia Musulmana en la Divina Comedia, which sparked lively and extended discussions among Dante scholars. Asíin here suggests Islamic sources for the theological landscapes used by the Italian poet Dante Alighieri (1265–1321) in his work La Divina Commedia, written c.1308 to 1320. Specifically, Asín compares the Muslim religious literature surrounding the night journey [al-'Isra wal-Mi'rag] of Muhammad (from Mecca to Jerusalem and thence up with the prophets through the seven heavens), with Dante's story describing his spiritual journey in which he meets various inhabitants of the afterlife and records their fate.

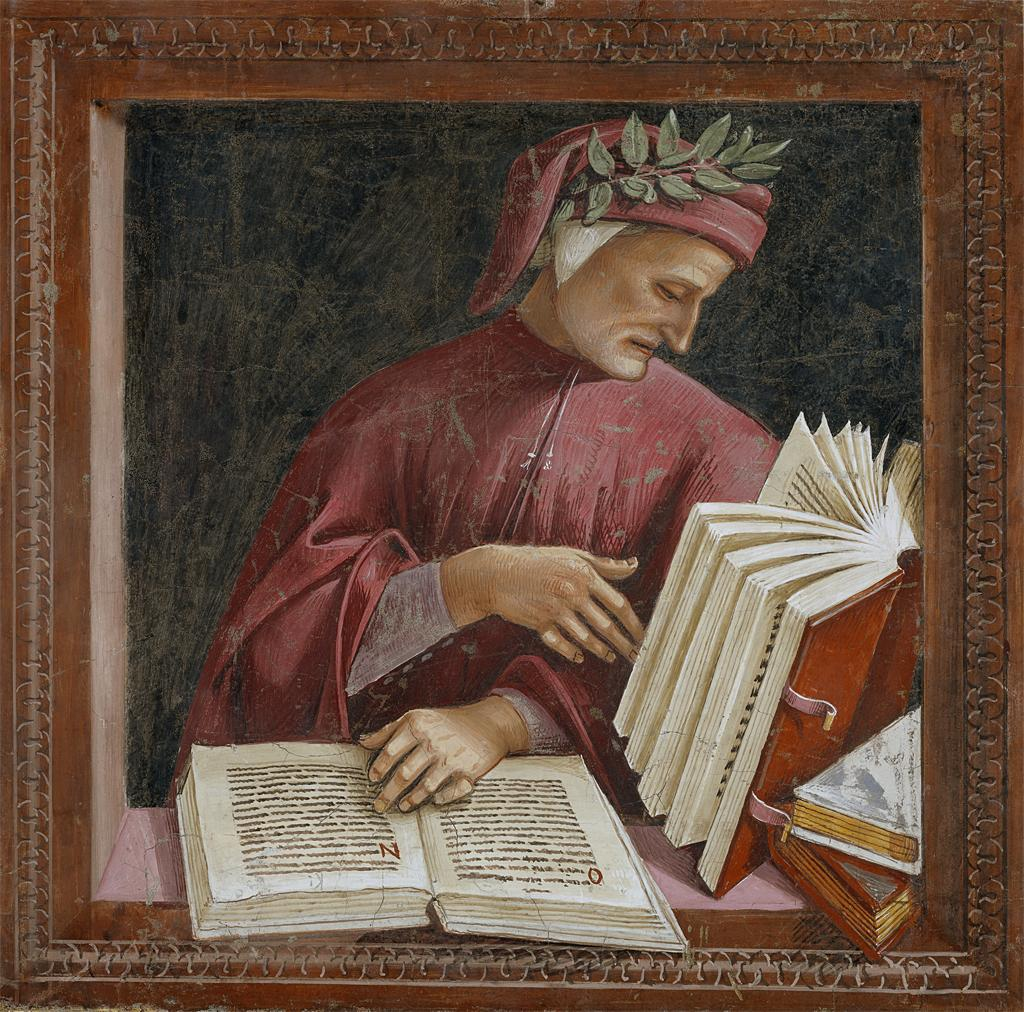
Dante, detail from Luca Signorelli fresco at Duomo di Orvieto

Accordingly, Asín (I) discusses in detail the above night journey in Muslim literature, (II) compares it to episodes in the inferno, the purgatorio, and the paradiso of La Divina Commedia, (III) investigates Muslim influence on corresponding Christian literature predating the poem, and (IV) conjectures how Dante could have known directly of the Muslim literature in translation.

Prior to Asín's La Escatologia it was assumed that Dante drew from the long poem the Aeneid by the ancient Roman poet Virgil for the inspiration to create the memorable scenes of the afterlife. In his Divina Comedia, Dante himself plays the leading role; he is guided by the deceased poet Virgil as they travel through the Inferno and the Purgatorio. Asín remarks that the addition of the Muslim sources in no way detracts from Dante's achievement, and that Dante remains a luminous figure and his poem retains its exalted place in world literature.

Asín's book inspired a wide and energetic reaction, both positive and negative, as well as further research and academic exchanges. Eventually two scholars, an Italian and a Spaniard, independently uncovered an until-then buried Arabic source, the 11th-century Kitab al-Mi'raj [Book of the Ladder (or of the ascent)], which describes Muhammad's night journey. This work was translated into Spanish as La Escala de Mahoma [The Ladder of Muhammad] by a scribe (Abrahim Alfaquim) of the Spanish king Alfonso X el Sabio in 1264.

Information also surfaced about another translation of it into Latin, Liber scalae Machometi, which has been traced to the Italian milieu of the poet, Dante Alighieri. Evidently Dante's mentor Brunetto Latini met the Latin translator of the Kitab al-Mi'raj while both were staying at the court of king Alfonso X el Sabio in Castilla. Although this missing link was not available to Asín, he had based his work on several similar accounts of Muhammad's ladder then circulating among the literary or pious Muslims of Al-Andalus.

=== Ibn Hazm ===
The importance of Ibn Hazm of Córdoba (994–1064) to the Muslim culture of Spain was earlier recognized by Asín. He had outlined Ibn Hazm's influence on medieval Islam, and had published a study with translation which addressed his ethical thought, followed by a volume concerning Ibn Hazm's views on religious history. During his career, Ibn Hazm became a remarkable figure, not least for the wide scope of his abilities, e.g., producing significant writings as a theologian, as a jurist, and as a poet.

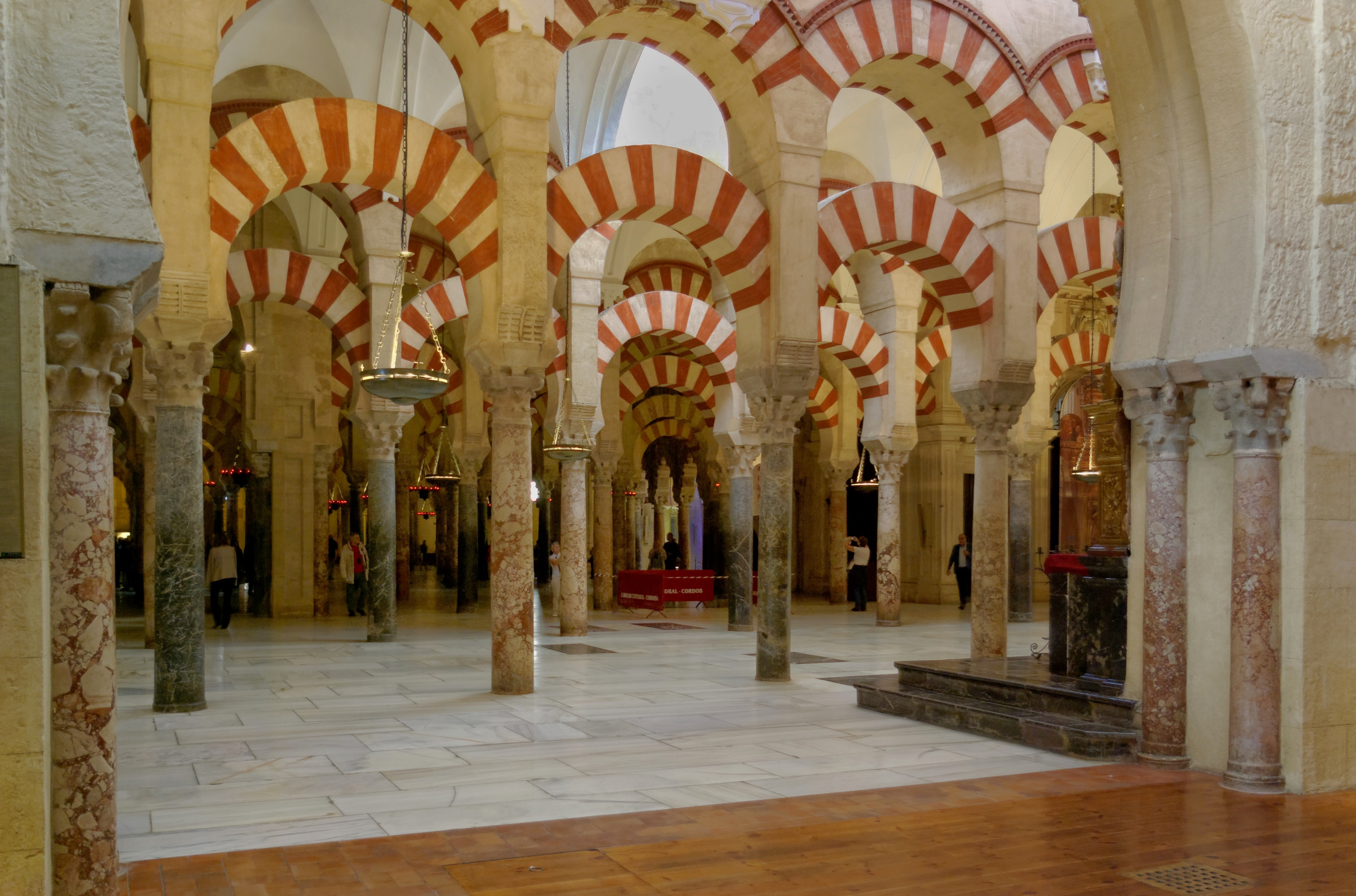
Interior of the Mezquita at Córdoba

From 1927 to 1932, Asín published a 5-volume study, Abenházam de Córdoba y su historia crítica de las ideas religiosas [Ibn Hazm of Cordoba and his "Critical History of Religious Ideas"]. Asín's first volume presents a biography, including his life as a jurist/politician and his trail through the world of intellect; Asín here gives a critique of the writings of the medieval Spanish Muslim, focusing on Ibn Hazm as a theologian and as an early historian of religions. The remaining four volumes comprise an incomplete yet lengthy translation of Ibn Hazm's Fisal, a very long work on the history of religious ideas, its Arabic title being Kitab al-Fisal fi al-milal wa-al-ahwa' wa-al-nihal [Book of Separation. Concerning Religions, Heresies, and Sects].

Ibn Hazm's Fisal has six parts: 1. non-Muslim religions (in Asín's volumes II-III), 2. Muslim sects (Asín's III-IV), 3. Muslim faith and theology (IV), 4. several constitutional questions regarding Islamic government (V), 5. Muslim heresies (V), 6. theology in 29 questions (V). In part 1 of the Fisal, Ibn Hazm gives a polemical description of Christian scriptures and trinitarian doctrine, its putative errors and contradictions, showing familiarity with the texts. He also comments on Judaism, Zarathustra, Brahmans, sophists, atheists, and polytheists. According to Asín, many subsequent anti-Christian polemics by Muslims more or less followed part I of Ibn Hazm's Fisal. Asín, in his "Disertación preliminar" to the Fisal, compares the late emergence of comparative religious history in Christian Europe with its relative early start in Islam, noting the geographical proximity of Islam to a variety of differing religions. For example, an early Islamic work that discusses Buddhism appeared in the 9th century. Yet Asín more than once refers to Ibn Hazm as the first historian of religions.

Asín Palacio's biography shows Ibn Hazm as once vizier to the declining Umayyad caliphs before retiring to his study. During the course of his career Ibn Hazm had become a Muslim jurist of the Zahiri (or "literalist") school of law. His legal treatise on fiqh, Ibtal, is referenced by Asín and regards the Zahiri rejection of the heuristic use of analogy, learned opinion, social equity, juristic authority, and 'spirit' of the law, as unacceptable legal method. Late in his Fisal, as a jurist Ibn Hazm addresses possible rebellion against an unjust Imam; the distinction is made between not obeying an unjust order and taking action to overthrow an unjust ruler. Ibn Hazm enters another controversy, opining that women may be given inspiration by God, referring to the "mujer de Abraham" (i.e., Sarah) and to the "madre de Jesús" María (like Mahoma visited by the "ángel Gabriel"). After publication of Asín's 5-volume study, additional writings of Ibn Hazm were discovered in the library of the Fatih Mosque in Istanbul, including legal responsa, to which Asin devoted an article.

=== Ibn 'Arabi ===
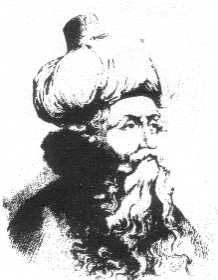
Muhyiddin Ibn 'Arabī Arabic: ابن عربي Spanish: Abenarabi

Another work by Asín, which became well known to scholars of Islam, addresses the life and the Sufi philosophy of Muhyiddin Ibn 'Arabi (1165–1240) of the Iberian city of Murcia. Asín Palacios had already written a number of studies and translations of Ibn 'Arabi, the revered (and controversial) mystic, but his major work was El Islam cristianizado. Estudio del sufismo a través de las obras de Abenarabi de Murcia (Madrid 1931). Following an introduction that proposes that Sufism emerged from the influence of Christian monasticism on Islam, the book presents three parts: first, a short life of Ibn 'Arabi [31–118]; second, commentaries that approach the complexity of his voluminous writings, his mystical teachings, his place in sufism, and his subsequent influence [119–274]; third, selections translated from seven of Ibn 'Arabi's works, including the Meccan Fotuhat [275–518].

Asín's brief biography describes Ibn 'Arabi's youthful 'conversion' to an inward path and first teachers, his adolescent meeting with Averroës, three of his visionary encounters with the 'maestro de verde' [green master] Jádir, and his travels visiting various sufis in al-Maghreb (e.g., Fes, and Túnez). In 1201 Ibn 'Arabi traveled further east across North Africa in pursuit of his spiritual journey, to Meca, Bagdad, Mosul, Cairo, Conia, Medina, Jerusalén, Alepo, and Damasco, where he died and where his tomb now draws pilgrims.

Ibn 'Arabi was a prolific teacher, leaving a vast corpus of written works. Asín functioned as a western pioneer in Sufi studies, particularly with respect to the difficult and demanding Ibn 'Arabi, the Shaykh al-Akbar. Not surprisingly Asín assumes the viewpoint of a spiritually involved Christian academic; he sees in the works of Ibn 'Arabi many similarities with his own religion's mystics and doctrines. Consequently, Asín brings his specific, spiritually-informed consciousness to his discussion of the principles and practices taught by Ibn 'Arabi. According to Prof. Alexander Knysh, Asín was one of the earlier western scholars of Ibn 'Arabi, a motivated European clergyman who was:

"concerned with detecting the underlying affinities between Christian and Islamic theology with a view to advancing an Islamo-Christian dialogue. Such Christian scholars treated Ibn 'Arabi, if not exactly as a crypto-Christian, then at least as a freethinker open to other religious confessions, especially Christianity. However, a scrutiny of Ibn 'Arabi's attitude toward other confessions, reveals little direct indebtedness to, or sympathy for, Christian doctrines."

Asín Palacios begins his second part by discussing the Sufi spiritual journey, its methods and discipline, and its various supporting societies. Here, Asín describes the distinct approaches found or developed by Ibn 'Arabi. For example, Asín mentions the purgative preparation required by Ibn 'Arabi regarding the four deaths, i.e., white, death to hunger; red, dying to passion; black, to endure suffering; green, to enter poverty. While some see adjacent virtues clearly when young, and others take first a hard path of trials and of sorrows ... eventually to meet a challenging paradox and become humbled in the wilderness; yet each soul may mercifully receive a spiritual transformation, to become ultimately possessed by divine love in a felicitous vision of unity. Ibn 'Arabi has described several varieties of sacred experience, including one in which, having known an awareness of unity with the Divine, a soul may return to the former daily life, yet nonetheless remaining aware also of the fruit of mystical events, conscious both of the "I and the not I", the commonplace and the transcendent. Here Asín apparently "avoided any analysis of Ibn 'Arabi's metaphysics."

In his introduction, Asín observes that while Christian Spain later became deeply influenced by Muslim mysticism, previously the oriental Church had equally influenced early Islam. Islam then arrived in the far west, the Maghreb al-Aksa and Andalusia, where Ibn 'Arabi would be born. From the perspective of religious studies, it might be said that Asín Palacios here presents us with a multidimensional, polyphonic text for comparative religion. In his other works on Sufi practice, Asín mentions precursors of Ibn 'Arabi in al-Andalus (i.e., the school of Ibn Masarra), as well as those who drew on his teachings afterwards (for example, the tariqah of the Sadilies [or xadilíes]). Asín refers to the many parallels between al-Ghazali and Ibn 'Arabi, both well-known and still studied teachers.

=== Various ===
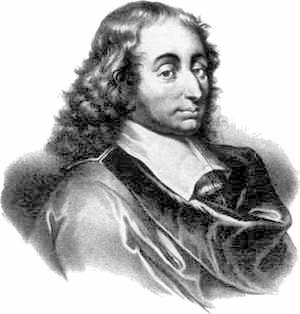
Blaise Pascal

Among the many articles of Asín Palacios are studies concerning the following subjects:

- Blaise Pascal (1623–1662) and his notion of placing a wager concerning the chances of reward or punishment after death, with respect to similar ideas in Al-Ghazali;
- Alumbrados, dissident religious groups organized in Spain during the 16th and 17th centuries, similarities compared with the Sadili school (tariqah).

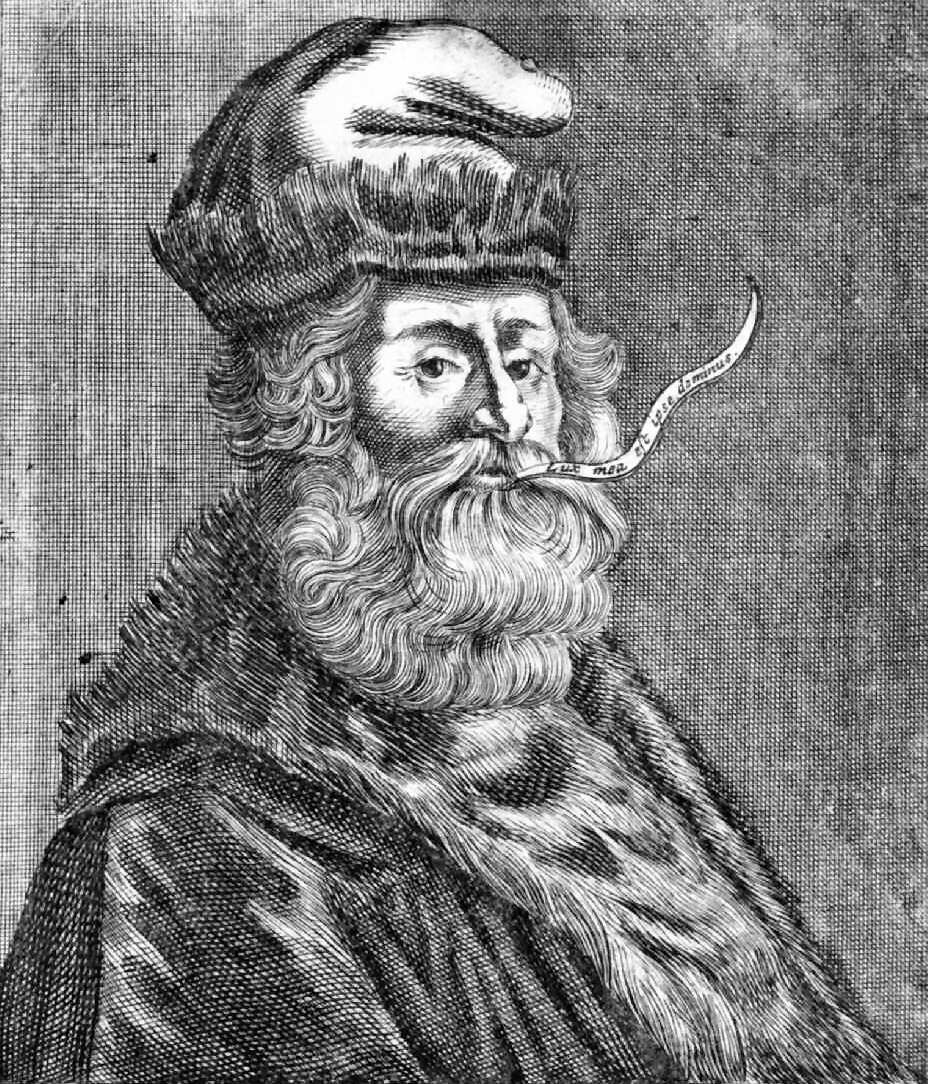
Ramon Lull

- Ramon Lull (1233–1315), mystic who sought to convert Islam to Christianity, whose ideas Asín discussed in his book on Ibn Masarra, and also with respect to Ibn 'Arabi;
- Ibn al-Arif (12th century) de Almería, influenced by Ibn Masarra, mentioned by Ibn 'Arabi; arif meaning "contemplation", although his practice was associated with quietist tendencies;
- Ibn Bajjah (1106–1138) of Zaragoza, known in Latin as Avempace, particularly with regard to Aristotle's impact on European and Arab philosophy.

Although Asín carefully followed the leads he found, nonetheless he continually seemed to remain grounded to his core area of research: the mutual influence of the distinctive civilizations of Islam and of Christianity during the centuries of Muslim rule in Spain, and thereafter, and the multilateral implications. Here is the transliteration of Asín's name to reflect its Arabic pronunciation: Asīn Balāthīus.

=== Al-Ghazali ===
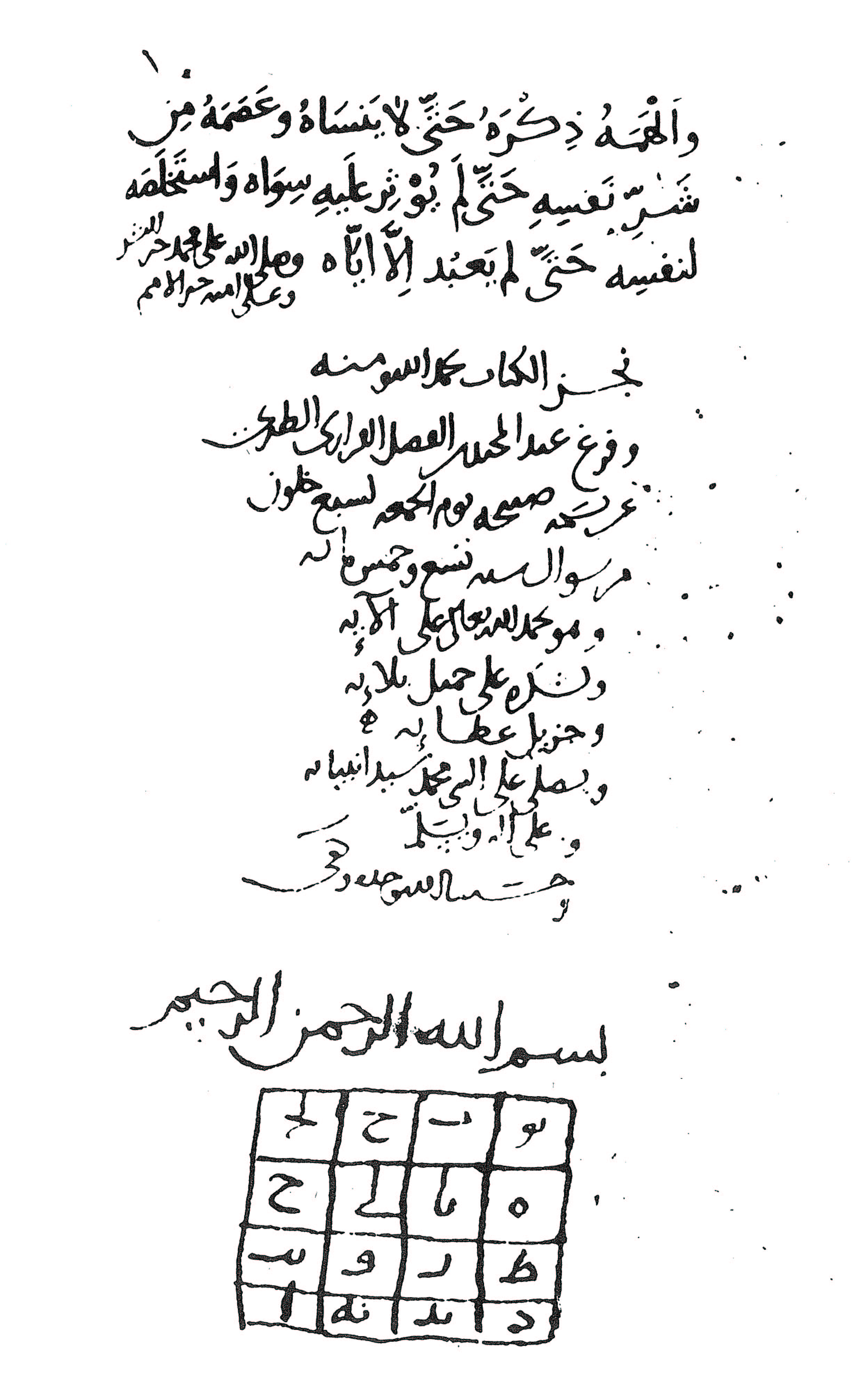
Autobiography of Al-Ghazali: the last page

In the 1930s, Asín began yet another study of Al-Ghazali (1058–1111), which is entitled, La espiritualidad de Algazal y su sentido cristiano. Asín expressly declared that the work was limited to a Christian interpretation of the celebrated Muslim and his work. His investigation focuses on themes of spiritual practice from the forty volume magnum opus of al-Ghazali, the Ihya 'Ulum ad-Din [Revival of the Religious Sciences].

British scholar A. J. Arberry in 1942 called Asín's multivolume study "by far the most important monograph on Ghazali so far written," but adversely noted the importation of foreign religious sentiments into Asín's work on the Muslim theologian. Yet Asín, noting the multiple interpenetration of the two rival faiths, felt justified in his course.

After addressing Al-Ghazali the person, including a short biography, Asín analyses the teachings of his Ihya in four parts:

- first, his purgative ascetics, for example, how to overcome sensuality, idle talk, anger and hatred, envy, worldliness, greed, glory, hypocrisy, pride, vanity, and spiritual illusion (in volume I);
- second, his path to unity, for example, penance, patience, gratitude, hope and fear, voluntary poverty, renunciation of the world, trusting in God, and love of God (vol. II);
- third, his way to perfection, for example, the life plan, purity and sincerity, conscience, meditation, and the religious song (vol. III);
- fourth, al-Ghazali's mystical doctrine, to which Asín also provides a Christian interpretation (also in vol. III).

In Asín's concluding volume IV, he translates selections from works by Al-Ghazali (21 titles other than the Ihya) and provides a brief analysis of each.

=== John of the Cross ===
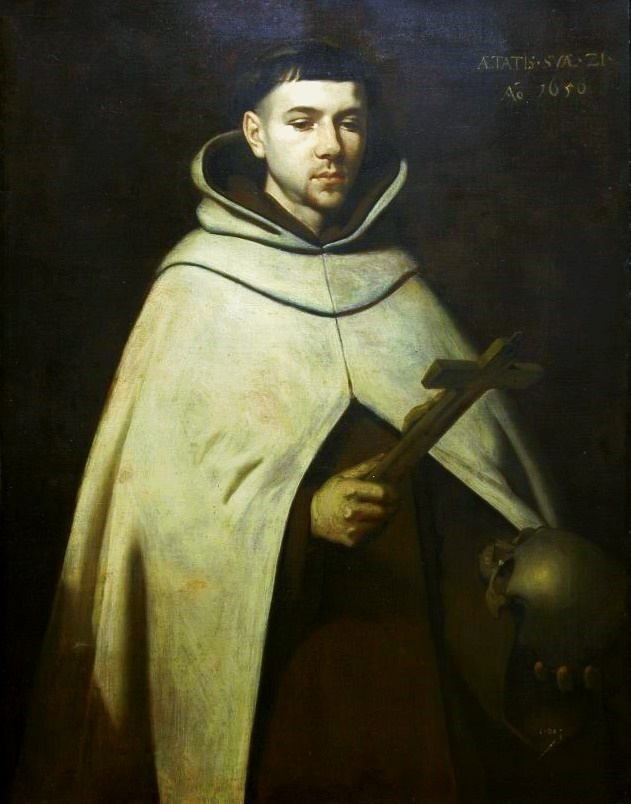
St. John of the Cross, Doctor of the Church

In 1933 Asín published in the first issue of the journal Al-Andalus an article about San Juan de la Cruz (1542–1591) and a doctrine he shared with spiritual Islam. This work can be seen to be equally about the saint's suggested forerunner, a Muslim mystic from Ronda, Ibn Abbad al-Rundi (1332–1389); and also about Ibn Abbad's own sources in the Sadili school (tariqah).

The shared doctrine concerns the soul on the path toward union with the Divine. God, being unreachably transcendent, the soul's only approach is to renounce everything but God. Thereby the soul enters a desolation in which he (or she) lives only for God, yet the desolation may become too severe, causing the soul to despair, so that the merciful Deity grants him (or her) inspiration, followed by a phase of elation; afterwards the soul returns to the way through desolation in order to move closer to God. The doctrine shared teaches that the soul passing through these alternating states of "night" (contraction, due to despair) and "day" (inspired expansion) may relinquish the charismata of God's inspiring favors, i.e., the "day", so as to pass more quickly beyond the difficult rhythm of "night" and "day". Thereafter the soul finds repose, wherein to enter the transforming union. Asín analyses the technical vocabulary used by the sadilis and by San Juan de la Cruz in order to further establish the connection.

While not disputing these similarities as discussed by Asín, a subsequent scholar, José Nieto, remained critical of any implied linkage between the earlier teachings of the Sadili sufis and San Juan de la Cruz. To the contrary, the suggestion is that this 'shared mystical doctrine' functions at such a level of generality that it will arise spontaneously.

=== Teresa of Ávila ===
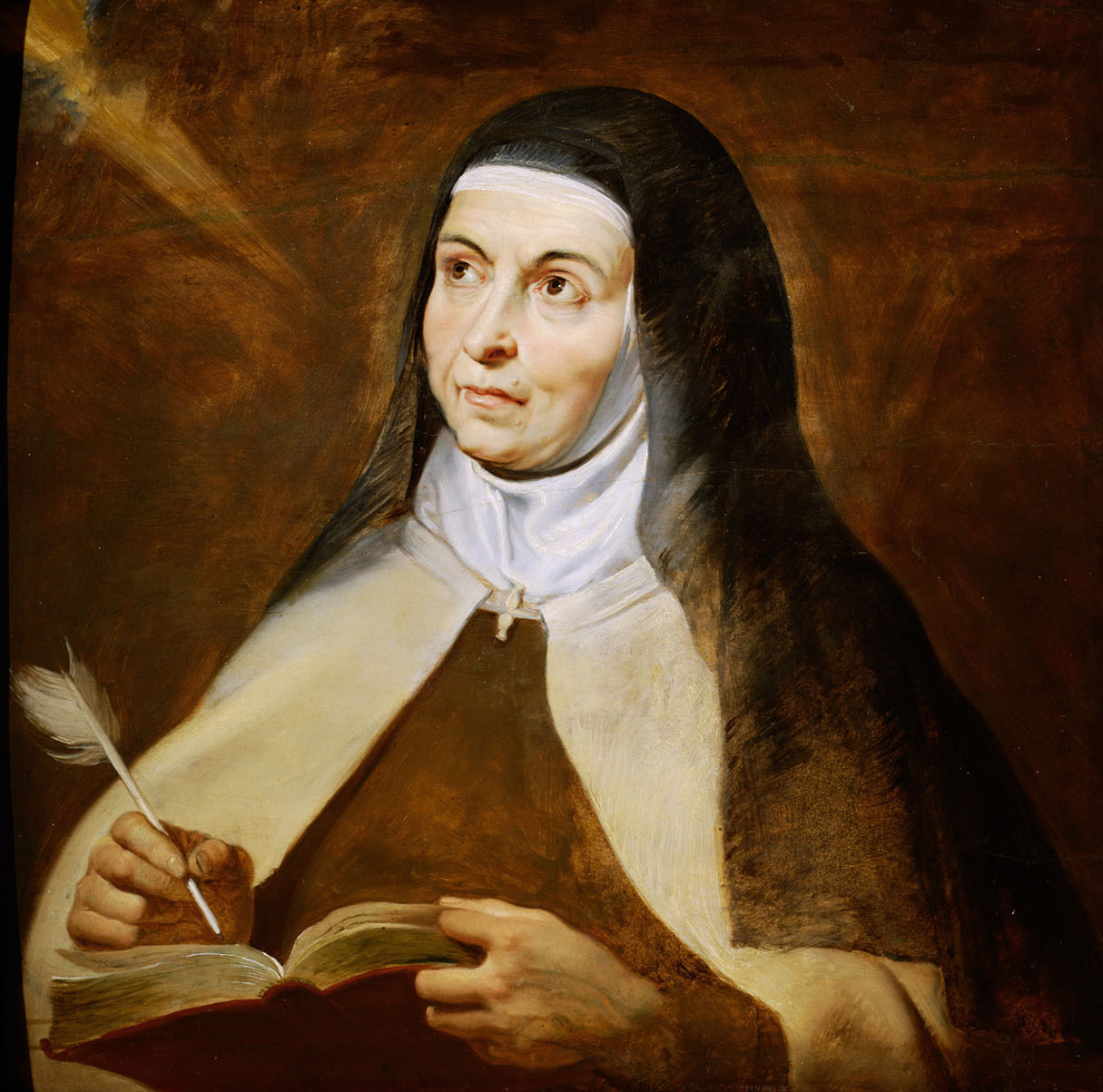
St. Theresa of Ávila, Doctor of the Church, by Peter Paul Rubens

In a posthumously published article, Asín discusses Santa Teresa de Ávila (1515–1582). The similes and analogies she employed to communicate the experiences of her spiritual life are discovered by Asín to parallel those previously employed by mystics of Islam. In this instance the image used is of seven dwelling places or castles, one inside the other. Asín mentions the Tanwir of the sadili Ibn 'Ata Allah; the Tayrid of Ahmad al-Gazali (brother of Algazel); and, the anonymous Nawadir compiled by Ahmad al-Qalyubi, with its seven concentric castles. Asín draws out other mutualities in the matrix of symbols, for example, the Divinity being in the central dwelling.

Luce López-Baralt further explores this association of images, tracing the parallel to a 9th-century Islamic mystic of Baghdad, Abu-l-Hasan al-Nuri (died 907), whose Maqamat al-qulub [Stations of the Heart] describes seven castles, one inside the other, through which the soul travels toward God. After quoting a passage in which Sta. Teresa describes her spontaneous acquaintance with the castle image, López-Baralt infers that Sta. Teresa's acquisition of the Islamic parallel was indirect, probably from a popular allusion that lay dormant within her for years, resurfacing later to help her communicate her mystical experiences. Following other similar studies, Catherine Swietlicki took a new but related direction, discussing Saint Teresa's Jewish heritage, and her mysticism as filtered through the mutual presence of three faiths. The Catholic writings of Santa Teresa de Ávila, widely recognized and revered, may accordingly be understood to reflect as well a generality of shared values among the Judaic, Christian, and Islamic faiths during those blessed periods of convivencia in medieval Spain.

== Perspectives ==
The works of Asín Palacios are widely admired, notwithstanding criticism that his viewpoint was of a Christian priest while involved in the academic field of Islamic studies. In his own country, the labors of the Spanish Arabists, to which he contributed greatly, has over the generations worked to favorably alter the view shared by many Spaniards concerning the Muslim period of their history. His spiritual insights into Islamic mysticism illuminated formerly obscure figures and hidden connections. Perhaps, too, along with Louis Massignon and others, it can be said that the Professor Rev. Miguel Asín Palacios was instrumental in the open recognition by the Catholic Church of Islam as a legacy of Abraham, articulated in the Nostra aetate document of Vatican II (1962–1965).

== Selected publications by Asín ==
=== Books ===
- Algazel, dogmática, moral y ascética (Zaragoza: Tip. y Lib. de Comas Hermanos 1901), with prologue by Menéndez y Pelayo at vii-xxxix.
- Abenmasarra y su escuela. Orígenes de la filosofía hispano-musulmana (Madrid 1914, Impressa Ibérica 1917); reprint Hiperión, 1991.
- Logia et Agrapha Domini Jesu Apud Moslemicos Scriptores, Asceticos Praesertim, Usitata.(Paris 1916).
- La Escatologia musulmana en la "Divina Comedia", (Madrid: Real Academia Española 1919; Editoria Plutarco, Madrid 1931); in the second edition (Escuelas de Estudios Árabes de Madrid y Granada, 1943), the text (468 pages) is followed by his Historia y crítica de una polémica of 1924, augmented (143 pages); third edition (Madrid: Instituto Hispano. Árabe de Cultura 1961); reprint 1984, by Hiperión.
- Dante y el Islam (Madrid 1927), preliminary note by Emilio García Gómez who edited this shorter version.
- Abenhazam de Córdoba y su Historia crítica de las ideas religiosas (Madrid: Real Academia de la Historia, & Madrid: Revista de Archivos 1927–1932), 5 volumes; reprinted by Ediciones Turner, Madrid, 1984 (five volumes).
- El justo medio de la creencia. Compendio de teología dogmática de Algazel. Traducción española (Madrid: Mestre 1929).
- El Islam cristianizado. Estudio del sufismo a través de las obras de Abenárabi de Murcia (Madrid: Editorial Plutarco 1931); reprint 1981, 1990 by Ediciones Hiperión, Madrid, 543 pages. Arabic translation by 'Abd al-Rahman Badawi: Ibn 'Arabi, hayatuhu wa-madhhabuh (al-Qahirah: Maktabat al-Anjlu al-Misriyah 1965). French translation: L'Islam christianisé: Etude sur le Soufisme d'Ibn 'Arabi de Murcie (Paris: Guy Trédaniel 1982). An abridgement [containing Part I (biography), and selections from Part III (translations)]: Amor humano, amor divino: Ibn Arabi (Córdoba: Ediciones El Amendro 1990).
- Vidas de santones andaluces, la "Epistola de la santidad" de Ibn 'Arabi de Murcia (Madrid 1933), a translation of the Ruh al-Quds. Cf. R.W.J.Austin's own translation of Ibn 'Arabi: Sufis of Andalusia. The Ruh al-Quds & al-Durrat at-Fakhirah (1971, 2002), at 18.
- La Espiritualidad de Algazel y su sentido cristiano (Madrid-Granada: Escuela de Estudios Árabes, & Madrid: Imprenta de Estanislao Maestre 1934–1941), 4 volumes.

=== Collected articles ===
- Huellas del Islam. Sto. Tomas de Aquino, Turmeda, Pascal, S. Juan de la Cruz (Madrid: Espasa-Calpe, 1941), 307 pages. A collection of five articles, the fifth being on revelation in Islam and the Christian Scholastics.
- Obras escogidas (3 volumes, Madrid 1946–1948). Collection from books and articles.
- Sadilies y Alumbrados (Madrid: Ediciones Hiperión, 1989), 452 pages. The posthumously published articles, with a critical introduction by Luce López-Baralt at ix-lxviii.
- Tres estudios sobre pensamiento y místico hispano-musulmán (Madrid: Ediciones Hiperión, 1991). A collection of: Ibn Masarra (1914), Abu-l-Abbas (1931), San Juan de la Cruz (1933).

=== Articles ===
- "Mohidin" in Homenaje a Menéndez y Pelayo (Madrid: Suárez 1899) at II: 217–256.
- "El filósofo zaragozano Avempace" in Revista de Aragón, numbers 7, & 8 (1900), numbers 10, & 11 (1901).
- "Bosquejo de un diccionario téchnico de filosofía y teología musulmana" in Revista de Aragón, III: 50–56, 385–392 (Zaragoza 1902); V: 179–189, 264–275, 343–359 (Zaragoza 1903).
- "El averroísmo teológico de Santo Tomas de Aquino" in Homenaje a D. Francisco Cadera (Zaragoza 1904), at pages 271–331.
- "El Lulismo exagerado" in Cultura Española (Madrid 1906), at 533.
- "La psicología de éxtasis en dos grandes místicos musulmanes, Algazel y Mohidin Abenarabi" in Cultura Española I: 209–235 (1906).
- "Sens du mot Tehafot dans les oeuvres d'el-Gazali et d'Averroes" in Revue Africaine nos. 261 & 262 (Algeria 1906).
- "La moral gnómica de Abenhazam" in Cultura Española XIII: 41–61 (Madrid 1909).
- "La mystique d'Al-Gazzali" in Melanges de la Faculte oriental de Beyrouth VII (Beirut 1914).
- "Logia et agrapha Domini Jesu apud moslemicos scriptores, asceticos praeserim, usitata" in Patrología Orientalis (Paris: Didot), XIII/3: 335–431 (1916, 1919); reprint: Editions Brepols, Turnhout (Belgium), 1974; under the Latin name of Michaël Asin et Palacios.
- "Los precedentes musulmanes del Pari de Pascal" in Boletin de la Biblioteca Menéndez y Pelayo (Santander), II: 171–232 (1920).
- "Influencias evangélicas en la literatura religiosa del Islam" in A Volume of Oriental Studies edited by Thomas Arnold and Reynold Nicholson (Cambridge Univ. 1922).
- "La escatología musulmana en la Divina Comedia, Historia y crítica de una polémica" appearing concurrently in Boletín de la Real Academia Española (Madrid 1924), Il Giornale Dantesco (Florence 1924), Litteris (Lund, Sweden 1924); "Influence musulmane dans Divine Comedie, Histoire et critique d'une polemique" in Revue de littérature comparée (Paris 1924).
- "Una sinopsis de la ciencia de los fundamentos jurídicos según Algazel" in Anuario de Historia del Derecho Español 2:13–26 (1925).
- "El místico murciano Abenarabe" in Boletín de la Academia de la Historia (1925–1928).
- "El místico Abu-l Abbas Ibn al-'Arif de Almeria y su Mahasin Al-Mayalis" in Boletín de la Universidad de Madrid III: 441–458 (1931).
- "Un precursor hispano musulmán de San Juan de la Cruz" in Al-Andalus I: 7–79 (Madrid-Granada 1933).
- "Por qué lucharon a nuestro lado los musulmanes marroquies" in Boletín de la Universidad Central (Madrid 1940), written in 1937.
- "Ibn-Al-Sid de Badajoz y su Libro de los cercos" in Al-Andalus V: 45–154 (Madrid-Granada 1940).
- "La Carta de Adiós de Avempace" in Al-Andalus VIII: 1–87 (Madrid-Granada 1943).
- "Sadilies y alumbrados" in Al-Andalus IX-XVI (Madrid-Granada 1944–1951).
- "El símil de los castillos y moradas en la mística islámica y en Santa Teresa" in Al-Andalus XI: 263–274 (Madrid-Granada 1946).

== Books and articles in English ==
- Asín Palacios, Islam and the "Divine Comedy", translated and abridged by Harold Sunderland (London: John Murray, 1926); reprint 1968, Frank Cass, London.
- Asín Palacios, The mystical philosophy of Ibn Masarra and his followers, translated by Elmer H. Douglas and Howard W. Yoder (Leiden: E.J.Brill 1978).
- Asín Palacios, Saint John of the Cross and Islam, translated by Elmer H. Douglas and Howard W Yoder, (New York: Vantage 1981).
- Commentary: Alfred Guillaume, article (1921); Thomas Walker Arnold, article (1921); Arthur Jeffery, article (1945); Francesco Gabrieli, article (1953); James T. Monroe, book (1970); Luce López-Baralt, continuation: book (1985 t:1992); Catherine Swietlicki, continuation: book (1986); Luce López-Baralt, continuation: article (2000).

== Selected commentary ==
=== Articles ===
- Menéndez y Pelayo, his prologue to Asín's Algazel (1901), at vii-xxxix.
- Louis Massignon, "Les recherches d'Asín Palacios sur Dante" in Revue du Monde Musulman XXXVI (Paris 1919); reprinted in Opera Minora I: 57–81 (Beirut 1963).
- Julián Ribera y Tarragó, "El arabista español" (Real Academia Española, 1919); reprinted in Ribera, Disertaciones y Opusculos (Madrid: Imprenta de Estanislao Maestre 1928) at I: 457–488.
- Giuseppe Gabrieli, "Intorno alle fonti orientali della Divina Comedia" in Arcadia III (Roma 1919); "Dante e l'Islam" in Scritti vari pubblicati in occassione del VI centario della morte di Dante Alighieri (Varallo Sessia, 1921).
- A. Nallino, article in Revista degli Studi Orientali (Roma 1921) at VIII/4.
- Alfred Guillaume, "Mohammedan Eschatology in the Divine Comedy" in Theology (London, June 1921).
- Thomas Walker Arnold, conference lecture given at the University of London, in Contemporary Review (London, August 1921).
- Emilio García Gómez, "Don Miguel Asín, 1871–1944. Esquema de una biografia" in Al-Andalus, IX: 267–291 (1944); a bibliography by Pedro Longas follows at 293–319.
- es:Ángel González Palencia, "Necrologia: Don Miguel Asín Palacios" in Arbor II/4-5: 179–206 (1944).
- Henri Terrasse, "Necrologie. Miguel Asín Palacios" in Hesperis XXXII/19: 11–14 (Rabat 1945).
- Louis Gardet, "Hommage a Don Miguel Asín Palacios" in Ibla 229–243 (Tunes 1945).
- Arthur Jeffery, "Miguel Asín" in The Muslim World 35: 273–280 (1945).
- Giorgio Levi della Vida, "Nuova luce sulle fonti islamiche della Divina Commedia" in Al-Andalus XIV: 376–407 (1949).
- Francesco Gabrieli, "New Light on Dante and Islam" in East and West IV/3: 173–180 (Roma 1953).
- Enrico Cerulli, "Dante e l'Islam" in Al-Andalus XXI: 229–253 (1956).
- Wunderli, "Zu Auseinander-setzungen. Uber die muselmanische Quellen der Divina Commedia. Versuch einer kritischen Bibliographie" in Romanistiches Jahrbuch, XV: 19–50 (1964).
- Ignazio M. L. Sa'ade, "Adwa' 'ala al-mustasriq al ispani Asín Balaziyus wa-l hiwar bayna al Masihiyya wa-l Islam" in Al-Masarra (Lebanon, February 1968).
- Rafael Lapesa, "En el centario del nacimiento de Don Miguel Asín, I, linguista" in Al-Andalus XXXIV: 451–460 (1969), and in Boletin de la Real Academa Española 51: 393–402 (1971).
- Mikel de Epalza, "Massignon et Asín Palacios: une longue amitie et deux aproches differentes de l'Islam" in Cahiers de l'Herne 13: 157–169 (Paris 1970).
- Luce López-Baralt, her critical introduction to Asín's Sadilies y Alumbrados (1989), at ix-lxviii.
- Julia Bolton Holloway, "The Road through Roncesvalles: Alfonsine formation of Brunetto Latini and Dante--Diplomacy and Literature," pp. 109–123, e.g., at 109, 112, 123, in Robert I. Burns, editor, Emperor of Culture. Alfonso X the Learned of Castile and his thirteenth-century Renaissance (University of Pennsylvania 1990).
- Rafael Ramón Guerrero, "Miguel Asín Palacios y la filosofía musulmana" in Revista Española de Filosofía Medieval 2: 7–17 (1995).
- Andrea Celli, "Miguel Asín Palacios, Juan de la Cruz e la cultura arabo-ispanica" in Rivista di Storia e Letteratura Religiosa, XLIII (2007).

=== Books ===
- Celli, Andrea (2005). Figure della relazione: il Medioevo in Asín Palacios e nell'arabismo spagnolo. Roma: Carocci
- García Gómez, Emilio & Rafael Lapesa (1969). En el centario del nacimiento de don Miguel Asín. Madrid: CSIC 1969)
- Monroe, James T. (1970). Islam and the Arabs in Spanish Scholarship. Sixteenth century to the present. Leiden: E. J. Brill [Chapter VII, "Philosophy: Miguel Asín Palacios," 174–195]
- Sepúlveda, Gérman (1965). Influencia del Islam en la Divina Comedia. Santiago de Chile: Instituto Chileno-Arabe de Cultura
- Valdivia Válor, José (1992). Don Miguel Asín Palacios. Mística cristiana y mística musulmana. Madrid: Hiperión

=== Continuations ===
- Jose López Ortiz, Derecho musulmán (Barcelona 1932). Augustinian.
- Ramón Menéndez Pidal, Poesía Árabe y Poesía Europea (Buenos Aires 1941, 1943, 1946); España, Eslabón entre la Christiandad y el Islam (Madrid: Espasa-Calpe 1956, 1968). Professor, University of Madrid.
- Isidro de las Cagigas, Minorías étnico-religiosas de la edad media española, I Los mozárabes (Madrid 1947–1948, 2 volumes), II Los mudéjares (Madrid 1948–1949, 2 volumes). Historian, Spanish diplomat.
- Enrico Cerulli, Il "Libro della Scala" e la questione delle fonti arabo-spagnole della Divina Commedia (Vaticano 1949); Nuove ricerche sul "Libro della Scala" e la conoscenza dell'Islam in Occidente (Vacticano 1972). Italian governor in Ethiopia, ambassador to Iran.
- José Muñoz Sendino, La escala de Mahoma, traducción del árabe al castillano, latín y francés, ordenada por Alfonso X el sabio (Madrid 1949), text independently discovered and published concurrently with Cerulli above.
- Jaime Oliver Asín, Historia del nombre "Madrid" (Madrid 1952). Nephew of Miguel Asín Palacios.
- A. Huici Miranda, Colección de crónicas árabes de la Reconquista (Tetuán 1952–1955) 4 volumes.
- Juan Vernet Ginés, Los musulmanes españoles (Barcelona 1961). Professor, University of Barcelona.
- Darío Cabanelas Rodríguez, Juan de Segovia y el problemo islámico (Madrid 1952); El morisco granadino Alonso de Castillo (Granada 1965); Ibn Sida de Murcia, el mayor lexicógrafo de Al-Andalus (1966). Franciscan.
- Miguel Cruz Hernández, Filosofía hispano-musulmana (Madrid 1957), 2 volumes. Professor, University of Salamanca.
- Cristóbal Cuevas, El pensamiento del Islam. Contenido e Historia. Influencia en la Mística española (Madrid: Ediciones Istmo 1972), 328 pages, at Parte II "Influencias Islámicas en la Mística Española" pages 217–312.
- Salvador Gómez Nogales, La política como único ciencia religiosa en al-Farabi (Madrid: Instituto Hispano-Arabi 1980).
- Luce López-Baralt, San Juan de la Cruz y el Islam (Colegio de México and Universidad de Puerto Rico 1985; Madrid: Hiperión 1990). Professor, Universidad de Puerto Rico.
- Luce López-Baralt, Huellas del Islam en la literatura española (Madrid: Ediciones Hiperión 1985, 1989); translated by Andrew Hurley as Islam in Spanish Literature (Leiden: E.J.Brill 1992).
- Catherine Swietlicki, Spanish Christian Cabala: The Works of Luis de León, Santa Teresa de Jesús, and San Juan de la Cruz (Columbia: University of Missouri Press 1986). Professor, University of Wisconsin–Madison.
- Maria Corti, Percorsi dell'invenzione. Il linguaggio poetico e Dante (Torino 1993). Professor, University of Pavia.
- Luce López-Baralt, "Saint John of the Cross and Ibn 'Arabi: The Heart or Qalb as the Translucid and Ever-Changing Mirror of God" in Journal of the Muhyiddin ibn 'Arabi Society, XXVIII: 57–90 (2000). Professor, Universidad de Puerto Rico.

=== Journal ===
The Instituto Miguel Asín Palacios continues to publish the journal Al-Qantara. Revista de Estudios Árabes, in conjunction with the Consejo Superior de Investigaciones Científicas (CSIC). Volume one of Al-Qantara [The Arch] was issued in 1980 at Madrid. This journal is a continuation of the journal Al-Andalus (1933–1978) which began under the direction of Professor Asín.

== See also ==
- The Divine Comedy
- Ibn 'Arabi
- Al-Ghazali
- Ibn Hazm
- Emilio García Gómez
- Luce López-Baralt
- James T. Monroe
