= James T. Monroe =

American academic

James Thomas Monroe, or James T. Monroe, is an American scholar and translator of Arabic. He is emeritus professor of Arabic and Comparative Literature at the University of California at Berkeley, focusing on Classical Arabic Literature and Hispano-Arabic Literature. His doctorate was from Harvard University. Professor Monroe works in the areas of lyric poetry, the Middle Ages, and East-West relations with particular interest in the importance of the Arab-contribution to Spanish civilization."

== Bibliography ==
=== Books: Annotated ===
==== Islam and the Arabs in Spanish Scholarship ====
- Islam and the Arabs in Spanish Scholarship (Sixteenth Century to the Present) (Leiden: E.J.Brill 1970, Reprint, with a preface by Michelle M. Hamilton and David A. Wacks Cambridge: ILEX Editions/Harvard UP 2021).

A survey of mostly academic studies of Islam and the Arabs. Monroe also reviews these works in terms of their literary origin and social context with regard to the evolving national consciousness of Spain, i.e., how the self-reflective nature of the issues addressed in these studies develops over the course of several centuries. Such a survey is particularly resonant with subtleties because of the eight hundred year presence of Arabic-speaking Muslim states in Spain, chiefly in the central and southern regions.

The book is divided into three parts:

1. the Study of Arabic Grammar and Lexicography (covers scholarship of seventeenth and eighteenth centuries, Chapter I);

2. the Study of Political History in Al-Andalus (regarding nineteenth century scholarship, Chapters II to V); and,

3. the Study of the Cultural History of Al-Andalus (early and middle twentieth century scholarship, Chapters VI to X).

Among figures discussed: Francisco Javier Simonet (III); Francisco Codera y Zaidín (V); Julián Ribera y Tarragó (VI); Miguel Asín Palacios (VII); Emilio García Gómez and Angel González Palencia (VIII); Miguel de Unamuno, José Ortega y Gasset, Ramón Menéndez Pidal, and Américo Castro (X).

==== The Shu'ubiyya in al-Andalus ====
- The Shu'ubiyya in al-Andalus. The risala of Ibn Garcia and five refutations (University of California Press 1970).

A translation from Arabic, with introduction and notes by Monroe. Concerns the literary reflections and polemical writings with regard to an intra-Muslim ethnic conflict in al-Andalus. Ibn Gharsiya [Ibn Garcia], a muladi poet (perhaps of Basque lineage), wrote his essay (risala) during the 11th century. It contests the then current Arab claims of supremacy over Muslims of other or mixed ethnicity. Hence it echoes the earlier Shu'ubite movement in Iran, which had challenged the Arab ascendancy there several centuries before.

==== Risālat al-tawābi' wa z-zawābi' ====
- Risalat al-tawabi' wa z-zawabi'. The treatise of familiar spirits and demons by Abu 'Amir ibn Shuhaid al-Ashja'i al-Andalusi (University of California Press 1971).

A translation with introduction and notes by Monroe. The poet Ibn Shuhayd (992-1035) of al-Andalus wrote this fictional narration of a voyage to the land of the djinn. Although only fragments survive, it has been reconstructed to some extent; Monroe dates it to 1025-1027. Into his stories Ibn Shuhayd places his poetry (see below, Monroe's Hispano-Arabic Poetry). Probably following somewhat al-Hamadhani's earlier invention, it is marginally of the maqama genre (see below, Monroe's The art of Badī' az-Zamān). The Risālat is sometimes mentioned among possible influences on Dante's Divina Commedia and al-Ma'arri's Epistle of Forgiveness. Monroe notes that here Ibn Shuhayd "developed a metaphysics into an aesthetics to account for the origin of beauty and the creative process in Arabic literature."

==== Hispano-Arabic Poetry ====
- Hispano-Arabic Poetry. A student anthology (University of California Press 1974, reprint Gorgias Press 2004).

Poems in Arabic script with English translation on facing page, as compiled by Monroe. In his sixty-page introduction Monroe seeks to situate the poets within the political and social environment, following poetry's fortunes over several centuries in the culture of al-Andalus. A poet's status varied: from being lauded and well patronized, to being religiously suspect and not welcome at the palace. Monroe also sheds light on the technical poetics of al-Andalus in terms general to Arabic literature.

Works by three dozen poets are translated, including: Ibn Shuhaid (992-1035), poet and author (see above, Monroe's Risalat); the well-known Ibn Hazm (994-1064), author of Tauq al-hamama ["The Dove's Necklace"], Ibn Hazm was also a Zahiri jurist and a philosopher-theologian; Ibn Zaydún (1003-1071), neoclassical poet; Al-Mu'tamid ibn Abbad (1040-1095), king of Seville, later deposed; Ibn Kafaja (1058-1139), nature poet; Ibn Baqi (died 1145 or 1150), muwashshaha poet; Al-Abyad (d.1130), muwashshaha poet, later crucified; Ibn Zuhr al-hafid (1113-1198), physician, muwashshaha poet; the great mystic and sufi shaykh Ibn 'Arabi (1165-1240); Ibn al-Khatib (1313-1374), vizier of Granada, historian, assassinated in Fez; Ibn Zamrak (1333-1393), whose poems are engraved on the walls of the Alhambra, later assassinated; and, Yusuf III, Sultan of Granada from 1408 until his death in 1417.

==== The art of Badī' az-Zamān al-Hamadhānī ====
- The art of Badi'u 'l-Zaman al-Hamadhani as picaresque narrative (American University of Beirut c1983).

Al-Hamadhani (d.1008) of Hamadhan or Hamadan (Ecbatana of ancient Iran) is credited with inventing the literary genre of maqamat. This form employs a combination of poetry and prose, in which often a wandering vagabond makes his living on the gifts his listeners give him following his extemporaneous displays of rhetoric, erudition, or verse, often done with a trickster's touch. Al-Hamadhani has become known by the title Badi' az-Zaman or Badi'u 'l-Zaman, "wonder of the age". See below, Monroe's translation of al-Maqamat al-Luzumiyah, and above his translation of Risalat al-tawabi' .

==== Ten Hispano-Arabic Strophic Songs ====
- Ten Hispano-Arabic Strophic Songs in the Modern Oral Tradition, co-authored with Benjamin M. Liu (University of California 1989).

The authors discuss the medieval genres of muwashshahas and zajals as they are currently sung in North Africa (the Maghrib). Because this music was not written, the oral performances are a crucial source. The Muslims of Spain (al-Andalus) were connected closely and directly with al-Maghrib, i.e., with those who later continued the music traditions of Andalus following the Spanish reconquista.

The book contains transliterated texts and translations of the verses, and about twenty pages of western musical notation of the songs, as well as discussion of their performance. Also translated are two chapters on music from a medieval Maghribi encyclopedia in Arabic by Ahmad al-Tifashi. The mutual relation of the songs to European romance is also addressed, with views and examples of a 'west-east' influence/counter-influence. The authors note that evidence of a "zealous guardianship of a venerable tradition... makes it conceivable that the Andalusian music we hear today does not differ radically from what we might have heard in medieval Andalus."

==== Al-Maqāmāt al-Luzūmīyah, by al-Saraqustī ====
- Al-Maqamat al-Luzumiyah, by Abu-l-Tahir Muhammad ibn Yusuf al-Tamimi al-Saraqusti ibn al-Astarkuwi (Leiden: Brill 2002).

The writer al-Saraqusti ibn al-Astarkuwi or al-Ashtarkuni (d.1143) here wrote in the genre maqamat. Saraqusti's collection of stories follows maqamat format in which, e.g., a trickster story teller may relate his adventures (see above, Monroe's book The Art of Badi' az-Zaman by al-Hamadhani). This literary genre is said to have influenced such works as the Spanish Libro de buen amor by Juan Ruiz (circa 1330).

Translation by Monroe with a 108-page preliminary study. Therein Monroe discusses: What is Maqamat? - Life of the Author - Works of the Author - Analysis of Four Maqamat - Doubling and Duplicity [originality within the genre] - Literary Decadence and Artistic Excellence - Remarks on the Translation and Annotations. About Saraqusti's collection of Maqamat, Monroe (at 108) comments on the difficulty to render it into a foreign language, as it is "a work studded with puns, rhymes, and double entendres." Over fifty Maqamat are translated here. Monroe gives high praise for the "baroque" art of Saraqusti, although acknowledging that his ornamented style, with verse and contrivance, is now out of fashion. Saraqusti was an Arab of 12th century al-Andalus.

Monroe (at 46-80) analyses four of the maqamat. In "Maqamat 41 (The Berbers)" the narrator Abu l-Gamr is a character who tells his own story, which includes contradictions and misinformation. An Arab, he is proud of his noble ancestry and traditions of generosity. On the other hand, he makes cutting remarks about the barbaric Berbers. Later as a guest of a party of Berbers, Abu l-Gamr is treated very well and trusted, but he nonetheless steals their wealth. Monroe comments that Saraqusti, here using negative example, teaches about the disagreeable and distorting nature of ethnic animosity.

=== Selected articles ===
- "Oral Composition in Pre-Islamic Poetry" in Journal of Arabic Literature, 3: 1-53 (1972).
- "Hispano-Arabic Poetry during the Caliphate of Cordoba" at 125-154 in Arabic Poetry: Theory and Development (Wiesbaden 1973), edited by G. E. von Grunebaum and Otto Harrassowitz.
- "Formulaic Diction and the Common Origins of Romance Lyric Traditions" in Hispanic Review, 43: 341-350 (1975).
- "The Hispanic-Arabic World" at 69-90, in Américo Castro and the meaning of Spanish civilization (University of California 1976), edited by José Rubia Barcia.
- "Pedir peras al olmo? On Medieval Arabs and Modern Arabists" in La Coronica, 10: 121-147 (1981-1982).
- "The Tune or the Words? (Singing Hispano-Arabic Strophic Poetry)" in Al-Qantara, 8: 265-317 (1987).
- "Which came first, the Zagal or the Muwass'a? Some evidence for the oral origin of Hispano-Arabic strophic poetry" in Oral Tradition, 4: 38-64 (1989).
- "Zajal and Muwashshaha: Hispano-Arabic Poetry and the Romance Tradition" at 398-419 in The Legacy of Muslim Spain (Leiden: E. J. Brill 1992), edited by Salma Khadra Jayyusi.
- "Was Calixto’s Grandmother a Nymphomaniac Mamlūk Princess? (A Footnote on 'Lo de tu abuela con el ximio' [La Celestina, Aucto 1])," with Samuel G. Armistead and Joseph H. Silverman, in "eHumanista" 14: 1-23 (2010).

== See also ==
- Arabic literature
- Al-Hamadhani
- Maqama
- Muwashshah
- Zajal
- Oral tradition
- Emilio García Gómez
