= Gustavo Sainz =

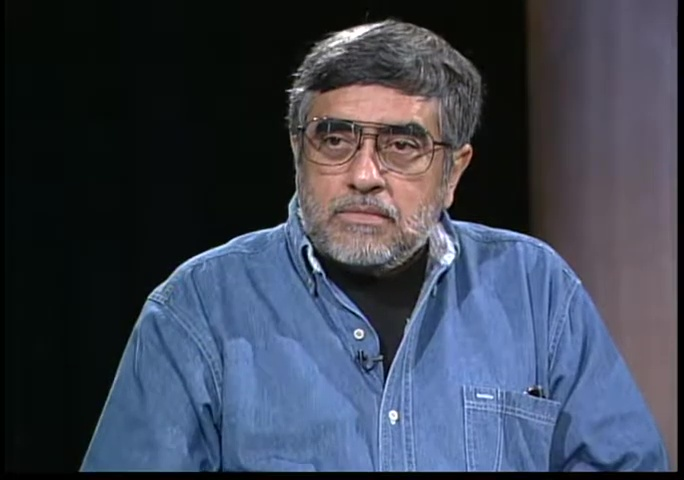
Sainz on CUNY TV's Charlando con Cervantes, 1996.

Gustavo Sainz (13 July 1940 – 26 June 2015) was a Spanish language author from Mexico.

== Biography ==
Sainz was born in Mexico City. As the son of journalist José Luis Sainz, Gustavo Sainz learned how to read at the age of three from his paternal grandmother, and started publishing his work in the city newspapers at the age of ten. When he was in primary school, Sainz founded several school magazines, which he continued to do until college. At the age of eighteen, Sainz left home to work as a journalist in the magazine Visión. In 1960, he entered the Universidad Nacional Autónoma de México, where he began studying law, but ultimately changed to study literature. Sainz's first novel, Gazapo, was published when he was twenty-five and has been translated into fourteen languages. This novel marked the beginning of the literary movement "la Onda", of which other Mexican writers, such as José Agustín and Parmenides García Saldaña, formed part.

In 1968, Sainz travelled to the University of Iowa to participate in the International Writing Program, where he started and completed his second novel, Obsesivos días circulares. Sainz's longest novel, A la salud de la serpiente, relates his adventures of this period in Iowa.

Upon his return to Mexico, he wrote La princesa del Palacio de Hierro, which won the Xavier Villaurrutia Award in 1974. It was translated into English by Andrew Hurley and published as The Princess of the Iron Palace by Grove Press in 1987. In 2003, he published A troche y moche, which won the prize for the best novel of the year written in Mexico, and its translation into French won the award for best novel in Quebec. His work includes eighteen published novels, countless articles, and various children's books.

Sainz was the editor of the magazine Transgresiones. He lived in the United States with his two sons, Claudio and Marcio Sainz, and was a professor in the Department of Spanish and Portuguese at Indiana University in Bloomington, Indiana. He died there of complications from Alzheimer's disease in 2015.

== Works ==
- Gazapo, 1965
- Obsesivos días circulares
- La princesa del Palacio de Hierro, 1974
- Compadre Lobo, 1977
- Fantasmas aztecas, 1982
- Paseo en trapecio
- Muchacho en llamas, 1988
- Retablo de heresiarcas e inmoderaciones
- A la salud de la serpiente
- A troche y moche, 2002
