= Islamistan =

Persianate term for a pan-Islamic state

Islamistan (Persian: اسلامستان, romanized: Eslâmestân, pronounced [eslɒːmeˈst̪ʰɒːn]; lit. "Islamland" or "the Land of Islam") is a Persian, Pashto and Urdu term referring to Dār al-Islām.

In Afghanistan during the Soviet–Afghan War, anti-Soviet factions came together to try to present a united front for the country. Some of these groups suggested that the name of Afghanistan be changed to Islamistan.

In 1949, the president of the Muslim League in Pakistan said in a speech that the country would bring all Muslim countries together under Islamistan.

Daniel Pipes quotes Hafeez Malik of Villanova University, who writes that "Pakistanis have started to speculate that Pakistan's natural habitat includes Turkey, Iran, Afghanistan, and the Central Asian Republics." Pipes then writes that "Sometimes called Islamistan, this region gets counterpoised against the Arabic-speaking south."

== See also ==
- Šuʿūbiyyah, movement of non-Arab Islamic civilisation
- Islamic world
- Arab world
