= Ibn Gharsiya =

11th century Andalusian writer and poet

Abū ‘Āmir Ibn Gharsīyah al-Bashkunsī (Arabic: أبو عامر بن غرسية البشكنسي) (died 1084), popularly known as Ibn Gharsiya or Ibn García, was a Muwallad poet and katib (writer) in the Taifa court in Denia.

Ibn Gharsiya is known as a proponent for the shu'ubiyya polemical thought in Al-Andalus, arguing in his Risala for the relative superiority of Byzantine and Persian culture over the culture of Arabs. Some scholars have interpreted the Risālah as a work by a freed slave arguing for the inclusion of his ṣaqālibah freedmen rulers of Dénia in the dominant Arabic-Muslim culture of al-Andalus.

== Personal background ==
Ibn Gharsiya was born into a Christian Basque family, but was taken prisoner in his childhood and raised in the Islamic faith. He grew up proficient and eloquent in both Classical Arabic and the colloquial Andalusi Arabic dialect. Ibn Gharsiya was proud of his Basque origin and remained a lifelong fervent Muslim throughout his lifetime. His surname al-Bashkunsi is the Arabic word for Basque, and therefore, signified his Basque heritage. He served under the Slavic Emir of Denia, Mujāhid al-‘Āmirī, and his son, Ali ibn Mujahid. Like Ibn Gharsiya, the ruling family of Denia were also Muwallad and had broken free from the Caliphate of Cordoba after the turbulent year of 1009. Like other taifas, his kingdom had sought to distance itself from the Umayyad period. Ibn Gharsiya subsequently spent most of his life as a katib at the court of Denia.

== Ideology ==
Ibn Gharsiya was a leading proponent and advocate of the Shu'ubiyya thought in Al-Andalus. The Shu'ubiyya movement demanded equality of power, wealth and status of the Non-Arab Berbers and Muwalladun by Arabs. In common with the Arabs, they were very active in promoting the Arab-Islamic culture and language and claimed cultural integration with the Arab ethnic groups—as had been achieved by the non-Arab Semitic peoples of the Middle East.

== The risala of Ibn Gharsiya ==
Between 1051 and 1056, Ibn Gharsiya wrote a risala against the Arab ascendancy in al-Andalus, which concurrently praises non-Arab Islam. Opponents of this work have called it violent, insulting, and bitter in its attack on the Arabs and, contrary to prevailing tradition, it criticises Arab Muslims as inferior in rank and lineage. Simultaneously, it glorifies non-Arab Muslims, such as the Berbers, and also those converts from the Visigoths, Slavs, and Romans.

In the risala, Ibn Gharsiya asserts cultural superiority of the Muwalladun over the Arabs by diminishing and belittling Arab culture. While he boasts about the Muladi mastery of natural philosophy, exact logic, astronomy, music, arithmetic, and geometry, he ridicules Arabs as "experts in the description of towering camels." He also tries to show that non-Arab rule in Denia was much better than those of the other taifas. By doing so, he attempted to formulate and legitimise a non-Arab alternative to Arab rule which involved combining Arab and non-Arab traditions, which were mainly Persian and Byzantine. This gave him an opportunity to debate with the Arab Islamic scholar Abu Jaʻfar Ahmad ibn al-Jazzar, who had been present at the court of Ibn Sumadih, Emir of Almeria. However, according to the Escorial manuscript, the letter was addressed to a certain Abu ʻAbd Allah Muhammad ibn Ahmad ibn al-Haddad al-Qaisi. However, despite this difference, it is clear that the addressee was linked to the court of Ibn Sumadih and to the taifa state of Almeria.

Ibn Gharsiya's epistle addresses some of the most fundamental and important questions in the Muslim community of al-Andalus at the time, such as the relationship between the Arabs and Berbers of the Islamic faith with the Muwalladun, who were the descendants of the indigenous Iberian converts to Islam. Ibn Gharsiya stressed that a sound interpretation of Islam should also be of value to the non-Arab Muslims. This epistle represents the adoption of the Eastern Shuʻubi ideology by many indigenous Andalusian Muslims, which argued against Arab exclusivity, as expressed in their treatises comparing the Arabs unfavourably with the Persians and the Byzantines.

Ibn Gharsiya's risala was written in Arabic courtly prose; thus it did not represent a rejection of Arabic literary culture, but only of Arab lineage. According to the Encyclopedia of Arabic Literature, this risala was of minor importance, and its few exponents tended to repeat clichés adopted from the earlier Islamic East. The risala elicited at least seven refutations, only five of which actually survive. Like the original, the refutations seem to have been written in imitation of eastern models. Only one of the refutations was specifically directed against Ibn Gharsiya.^{[a]} American scholar James T. Monroe states that the fact of Ibn Gharsiya's risala against the Arabs going unpunished, indicates that the cause of Arabism as a meaningful social force had ceased to have any political significance.

Göran Larsson, an associate professor of religious studies at the University of Gothenburg, Sweden, points out that in spite of his extensive use of Persian traditions in his risala, Ibn Gharsiya was not promoting a specifically Persian sovereign, merely a non-Arab model of rule. To this, Monroe adds:

"Had Ibn Garciá wished to reject Arabic culture in its entirety he would probably have written his risāla in a style different from the one that was judged at the time to be of good literary taste, and unlike the practice of Ibn Bassām, he might possibly have inserted postclassical literary forms into his composition. But the fact remains that the risāla is written in pure classical Arabic. It is a veritable mosaic of allusions to Arabic literature and history, containing quotations from the Koran, from poetry and proverbial wisdom. All of this is expressed by means of a highly elaborated rhymed prose of the kind that was so much in vogue among the prose writers of the fifth century of Islam, and it is decorated with all the ornaments of Arabic rhetoric. The choice of this stylistic medium of expression which had become the standard of secretarial literature throughout the Islamic world indicates that the author attempts to claim for the non-Arab secretarial class its rightful share in Arabic culture."

== Legacy ==
Besides the epistle, the only words from Ibn Gharsiya that has been preserved are some lines by the 12th century Andalusian geographer, historian and writer, Ibn Said al-Maghribi. These lines are believed to have been composed in praise of Ibn Gharsiya's lord, Ali ibn Mujahid. In praise of Ibn Gharsiya, Ibn Said states:

"He (Ibn Gharsiya) was one of the wonders of his age and the marvels of his time. Although his origin was of the non-Arabs, his famous risala bore witness to his firm command of the reins of the Arabic language. He was one of the children of the Christian Basques who was captured while still a child. His lord, Mujahid, the king of the Balearic islands and of Denia educated him. There was between Ibn Gharsiya and Abu Ja'far ibn al-Jazar, the poet, such a friendship that it caused the former to call the latter to join him and stop serving al-Mu'staim ibn Sumadih, lord of Almeria. Ibn Gharsiya found fault with him for adhering exclusively to the praise of Ibn Sumadih while neglecting the lord of his own country."

== See also ==
- Arabic literature
- Bashshar ibn Burd – famous Shu'ubi poet.
- Banu Qasi – Basque-Gothic Muslim dynasty.
- Count Cassius – progenitor of the Banu Qasi dynasty.
- Umar ibn Hafsun – Anti-Umayyad rebel leader.

== Footnotes ==
a Cf., The Shu'ubiyya in al-Andalus. The risala of Ibn Garcia and five refutations (University of California Press 1970), translated with an introduction and notes by James T. Monroe.
