= Julián Ribera =

Spanish Arabist and academic

The Most Excellent Julián Ribera
- Born: Julián Ribera y Tarragó; 19 February 1858; Carcaixent (Valencia), Spain
- Died: 2 May 1934 (aged 76); La Pobla Llarga (Valencia), Spain

Seat O of the Real Academia Española
- In office 26 May 1912 – 2 May 1934
- Preceded by: Melchor de Palau
- Succeeded by: Salvador Bermúdez de Castro

Julián Ribera y Tarragó (Carcaixent, Valencia, 19 February 1858 – 2 May 1934, La Pobla Llarga, Valencia) was a Spanish Arabist and academic.

== Career ==
Ribera studied under Prof. Francisco Codera y Zaidín at Madrid from 1882 to 1885. In 1887 at age 29 he became catedrático (full professor) of Arabic at the University of Zaragoza. There Prof. Ribera founded the Revista de Aragón. Later, in Madrid he co-founded (with Miguel Asín Palacios) the journal Cultura Española (1906–1909). He had transferred from Zaragoza to become catedrático of History at the University of Madrid, then of Literature in 1913. Prof. Ribera and his former student Prof. Asín collaborated on various academic projects. His career was celebrated by his peers in his Jubilación of 1927. When Prof. Ribera retired, his chair was taken by Ángel González Palencia.

== Studies ==
Ribera's work focused on the Islamic culture of Al-Andalus and its legacy in Spain. He would eventually take several new approaches to Arabic studies, although he began following the lead of his mentor Prof. Codera. He wrote on education and on legal history. In mid-course Ribera was influenced by the spirit of the generación del 98. Later his interest was directed to investigating the rich heritage of Arabic music and poetry in Al Andalus, and the extent of its influence on subsequent Spanish literature and music, as well as on that of other European countries. Subtle interconnections and relationships were revealed and discussed by Prof. Ribera. He was at the cutting edge of work in this area, which has since grown into a large corpus of academic studies.

== Selected works ==
=== Books ===
- La enseñanza entre los musulmanos españoles (Zaragoza: Ariño 1893; Academia de Córdoba 1925).
- Orígenes del Justicia de Aragón (Zaragoza: Comas 1897).
- Historia de los jueces de Córdoba por Aljoxaní (Madrid: Centro de Estudios Históricos 1914), an annotated translation of the Kitab Qudat Qurtuba by al-Khushani, of Afriqiya (Tunisia), who became a judge in Al Andalus under the Almoravid regime (1086–1170).
- El cancionero de Abencuzmán (Madrid: Imprenta de Estanislao Maestre 1914), a study of the Diwan of the poet Ibn Quzman of Córdoba (circa 1078-1160), in comparison with later European verse.
- Épica Andaluza Romanceada (Madrid: Real Academia de la Historia 1915).
- La música de las Cantigas. Estudio sobre su origen y naturaleza (Madrid 1922). Translated and abridged by Hague and Leffingwell as Music in Ancient Arabia and Spain (Stanford University 1929).
- La música árabe y su influencia en la española (Madrid 1927), popular version of his La música de las Cantigas of 1922; reprinted in Madrid by Mayo de Oro, 1985.

=== Articles ===
- "Orígenes de la filosofía de Raimundo Lulio" in Homenaje a Menéndez y Palayo (Madrid 1899), at II: 191-216.
- "Origen del colegio Nidamí de Bagdad" in Homenaje a D. Francisco Codera (Zaragoza: Escar 1904), at 3-17.
- "El arabista español" (Real Academia Española, 1919).

=== Collections ===
- Disertaciones y Opúsculos. Edición colectiva que en su jubilación del profesorado le oferecen sus discípulos y amigos (Madrid: Imprenta de Estanislao Maestre 1928), 2 volumes.
- Opúsculos dispersos (Tetuán 1952).

== Commentary ==
- Miguel Asín Palacios, "Introducción" to the Disertaciones y Opúsculos of Prof. Ribera (Madrid 1928), at I: xv-cxvi.
- James T. Monroe, Islam and the Arabs in Spanish Scholarship. Sixteenth century to the present (Leiden: E.J.Brill 1970, Reprint, Cambridge: ILEX Editions/Harvard UP 2021), at Chapter VI: "Julián Ribera y Tarragó" (pages 151-173).
- Andrea Celli, Figure della relazione. Il Medioevo in Asín Palacios e nell'arabismo spagnolo (Roma: Carocci 2005), at Chapter I: "L'Europa degli arabi. Tra filologia e Medioevo di Spagna" (pages 15–87)
- Glick, Thomas (1985). "George Sarton and the Spanish Arabists". Isis. 76 (4): 493. doi:10.1086/353959. JSTOR 233023. S2CID 144270576.
