= Shu'ubiyya =

Early Muslim movement

Shu'ubiyya (Arabic: الشُعُوبِيَّة, romanized: aš-šuʿūbiyya) was a social, cultural, literary, and political movement in the early Muslim world that sought to oppose the privileged status of Arabs and claims of Arab ethnic and cultural superiority. Its antecedents appeared under the Umayyad Caliphate, while the controversy became particularly prominent under the early Abbasid Caliphate. Some advocated equality (taswiya) between Arabs and non-Arabs, while others went further and asserted Persian or other non-Arab superiority (tafdīl) over Arabs. Many Shu'ubis were Persian, although Shu'ubi arguments were not confined exclusively to Persians. Among the first Western scholars to study the Shu'ubiyya extensively in the late nineteenth century was the Hungarian scholar Ignaz Goldziher, who described it in the first volume of his work ''Muslim Studies''.

== Terminology ==
The name of the movement is derived from the use of šuʿūb for "nations" or "peoples" in the Quran:

يَا أَيُّهَا النَّاسُ إِنَّا خَلَقْنَاكُم مِّن ذَكَرٍ وَأُنثَى وَجَعَلْنَاكُمْ شُعُوباً وَقَبَائِلَ لِتَعَارَفُوا إِنَّ أَكْرَمَكُمْ عِندَ اللَّهِ أَتْقَاكُمْ إِنَّ اللَّهَ عَلِيمٌ خَبِيرٌ
transl. "O mankind! Indeed, We have created you from male and female and made you peoples and tribes that you may know one another. Indeed, the most noble of you in the sight of Allah is the most righteous of you. Indeed, Allah is Knowing and Acquainted."

— Quran 49:13, (Sahih International)

Islamic scholars and Quranic exegetes interpret this verse as a declaration of the fundamental equality of all human beings against ethnic, racial, social, cultural, or linguistic differences, with only faith in God serving as a valid measure of a person's value.

== Central Asia, Khorosan and Persia ==
When used in the context of Iran, the term refers to a socio-literary controversy that peaked during the 8th and 9th centuries. It emerged among non-Arab Muslims—predominantly of Persian descent—as a response to the privileged socio-political status held by Arabs in the early Islamic empire. Early Shu'ubiyya was primarily articulated through Arabic literature and administration. In this context, Persian scholars and bureaucrats (kuttab) asserted their cultural equality (taswiya) or superiority over Arabs.

In subsequent periods, particularly under the patronage of the Samanid Empire, this cultural consciousness evolved into a significant revival of Persian literature and new forms of poetry. While the broader Shu'ubiyya movement included various non-Arab groups across the Islamic world, such as Egyptians, Berbers, and Arameans, its most prominent and heavily documented expressions in the eastern provinces were driven by those of Persian descent.

However, it seems that the Shu'ubiyya sentiment was not universally adopted by all intellectuals of Iranian descent. Many prominent native scholars actively defended the linguistic and cultural integration within the Arabic-speaking Islamic empire, viewing Arabic as the indispensable medium for universal knowledge and explicitly rejecting ethnocentric linguistic movements. A notable example is the renowned Khwarazmian polymath Al-Biruni (d. 1048) (Uzbekistan, Central Asia). In the introduction to his Kitab al-Saydanah fi al-Tibb (Book of Pharmacognosy), Al-Biruni emphasized the inseparable link between the Islamic state and the Arabic language, stating: "Our religion and the empire are Arab." He further disparaged the use of Persian for scientific and academic discourse, writing:

"I was raised in a language in which, if a science were to be perpetuated, it would look as strange as a camel on a roof... I then passed to Arabic and Persian... and I swear by God that to be reviled in Arabic is dearer to me than to be praised in Persian. Every man who knows the Persian language knows that it is suited only for historical epics and bedtime stories, whereas Arabic is the language of science."

Ibn al-Muqaffa', a prominent 8th-century writer and translator of Persian descent, similarly held critical views regarding the intellectual originality of his ancestral culture when compared to other civilizations. In a well-documented historical anecdote recorded by Al-Jahiz, Ibn al-Muqaffa' initiated a discussion with his companions regarding which nation possessed the greatest intellect. When his companions suggested the Persians, he explicitly rejected the premise. Instead, he characterized the Persians as a people who "were taught and learned" and who relied on imitating established examples rather than original invention. In his broader comparative assessment, he systematically categorized the traits of various contemporaneous nations—attributing craftsmanship to the Chinese, philosophy to the Indians, and engineering to the Byzantines—ultimately arguing that the innate, uninstructed deduction of the Arabs demonstrated a more organic form of intellect.

The culmination of this cultural revival, often associated with later Shu'ubiyya sentiments, is prominently manifested in Ferdowsi's epic poem, the Shahnameh (Book of Kings). Completed in the early 11th century and dedicated to the Turkic ruler Mahmud of Ghazni, the work is primarily a compilation of pre-Islamic mythology, folklore, and heroic legends, rather than a factual historical chronicle. From a linguistic perspective, Ferdowsi deliberately sought to minimize the use of Arabic vocabulary, an endeavor known as linguistic purism (sara-nawīsī).

== In al-Andalus ==
Two centuries after the end of the Shu'ubiyyah movement in the east, another form of the movement came about in Islamic Iberia and was controlled by Muwallad (mixed Arab and Iberian Muslims). It was fueled mainly by the Berbers, but included many European cultural groups as well including Galicians, Catalans (known by that time as Franks), Cantabrians, and Basques. A notable example of Shu'ubi literature is the epistle (risala) of the Andalusian poet Ibn Gharsiya (García).

== Opposition ==
The Shu'ubiyya movement faced fierce intellectual, moral, and political opposition from contemporaneous scholars and state officials. Early works denouncing Shu'ubist rhetoric were authored by prominent figures such as the Arab polymath Al-Jahiz and the scholar Ibn Qutaybah (who was himself of Persian descent).

As the controversy peaked, anti-Shu'ubi intellectuals systematically dismantled the movement's arguments. The prominent 10th-century Arab philosopher and writer Abu Hayyan al-Tawhidi extensively documented these polemics in his seminal work Al-Imta' wa al-Mu'anasa. For instance, Al-Tawhidi recorded the rebuttals against Shu'ubi figures like a Samanid vizier named Al-Jayhani, who argued that Arabs lacked foundational contributions to empirical sciences such as medicine, geometry, and music. Al-Tawhidi countered this by exposing the historical fallacy of the premise; saying that these exact sciences and books were primarily of Greek origin, not Persian. Therefore, the Persians could not logically claim these foreign achievements as proof of their own inherent cultural supremacy.

Furthermore, the opposition launched severe moral and cultural critiques against pre-Islamic Persian society. As documented by Al-Tawhidi, figures such as Judge Abu Hamid al-Marwarrudhi and Abu Dawud al-Ansari attacked the moral high ground of the Shu'ubiyya by heavily criticizing the historical Zoroastrian practice of consanguineous marriage (incestuous unions among next of kin). They argued that such practices violated innate human nature (fitra) and basic rational morality. To contrast this, anti-Shu'ubi intellectuals highlighted the Arabs' pre-Islamic biological awareness of exogamy; they pointed to the established Arab custom of marrying outside the immediate family to avoid weak offspring (al-dawa), presenting this inherent cultural trait as evidence of the Arabs' superior natural intellect and physical constitution.

Opposition to Shu'ubism was not limited to ethnic Arabs; powerful state officials of Persian descent actively suppressed the movement, viewing it as a vehicle for religious heresy. A well-known historical anecdote recorded in classical literature involves the powerful Buyid vizier Sahib ibn 'Abbad. When a Shu'ubi poet recited verses in his court mocking the Bedouin origins of Arabs while glorifying the Sasanian legacy, Ibn 'Abbad commanded the renowned poet Badi' al-Zaman al-Hamadani to publicly refute him. Following Al-Hamadani's extemporaneous defense of Arab heritage, Ibn 'Abbad banished the Shu'ubi poet under the threat of execution. The vizier explicitly linked Shu'ubism to hidden heretical motives, reportedly stating: "I do not see anyone preferring the Ajam (non-Arabs) over the Arabs except that he has a vein of Magianism [Zoroastrianism] drawing him to it."

Further intellectual opposition came from the very non-Arab scholars who mastered and codified the Arabic sciences. A prominent example is the renowned 12th-century Khwarazmian linguist and theologian Al-Zamakhshari. In the introduction to his seminal grammatical treatise, Al-Mufassal fi San'at al-I'rab, Al-Zamakhshari explicitly condemned the Shu'ubiyya movement. Despite his own Persian origins, he praised God for making him a scholar of Arabic and for instilling in him a fierce scholarly zeal (asabiyya) for the Arabs. He declared his absolute refusal to ever "defect to the ranks of the Shu'ubiyya," characterizing their movement as a futile endeavor that only brought its adherents intellectual scorn and the curses of established scholars.

== Neo-Shu'ubiyya ==
In 1966, Sami Hanna and G. H. Gardner published an essay, "Al-Shu‘ubiyah Updated". In 1972, Dutch university professor Leonard C. Biegel, responding to Hanna and Gardner, coined the term "Neo-Shu'ubiyah" for modern forms of alternative non-Arab and often non-Muslim nationalism in the Middle East, e.g., Assyrian nationalism, Kurdish nationalism, Berberism, Coptic nationalism, Pharaonism, and Phoenicianism. In 1984, Daniel Dishon and Bruce Maddi-Weitzmann used also used the neologism "Neo-Shu'ubiyya".

== See also ==
- Islamization of Iran
- Ajam
- Mawali
- Islamistan, movement of non-Arab Islamic unity
- Bashshar ibn Burd, famous Shu'ubi poet
- Islam Nusantara

== Sources ==
- E. van Donzel; W.P. Heinrichs; G. leComte (1997). Encyclopedia of Islam, the. Leiden Brill. ISBN 90-04-05745-5.
- Enderwitz, S. (1997). "al-S̲h̲uʿūbiyya". In Bosworth, C. E.; van Donzel, E.; Heinrichs, W. P. & Lecomte, G. (eds.). The Encyclopaedia of Islam, Second Edition. Volume IX: San–Sze. Leiden: E. J. Brill. pp. 513–516. ISBN 978-90-04-10422-8.
- Hughes, Thomas Patrick (1994). Dictionary of Islam. Chicago, Illinois: Kazi Publications Inc. USA. ISBN 0-935782-70-2.
- Larsson, Goran (2005). "Ignaz Goldziher on the shuʿūbiyya". Zeitschrift der Deutschen Morgenländischen Gesellschaft. 155 (2): 365–372. JSTOR 43382104.
- Mottahedeh, Roy (April 1976). "The Shu'ubiyah Controversy and the Social History of Early Islamic Iran". International Journal of Middle East Studies. 7 (2): 161–182. doi:10.1017/S0020743800023163. S2CID 162385854.
- Savant, Sarah Bowen (2013). The New Muslims of Post-Conquest Iran: Tradition, Memory, and Conversion. Cambridge University Press. ISBN 9781107292314.
- Savant, Sarah Bowen (2016). "Naming Shuʿūbīs". Essays in Islamic Philology, History, and Philosophy. De Gruyter. pp. 166–184. doi:10.1515/9783110313789-010. ISBN 9783110313789.
- Wehr, Hans; J M.Cowan (1994). Arabic-English Dictionary. Urbana, Illinois: Spoken Language Services Inc. ISBN 0-87950-003-4.
