= Bashshar ibn Burd =

Arab poet of Persian origin (714–783)

- بشّار بن برد
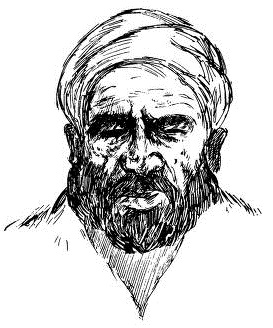
- Died: 783
- Writing career
- Language: Arabic
- Genre: Maqama
- Movement: Badi'

Abū Muʿādh Bashshār ibn Burd (Arabic: أبو معاذ بشّار بن برد; 714–783), nicknamed al-Muraʿʿath (Arabic: المرعّث, 'the wattled'), was an Arabic-speaking poet of Persian descent during the late Umayyad and early Abbasid periods. Some scholars consider Bashshar the first "modern" poet in Arabic literature.

== Life ==
Bashshar was born into a family of Persian stock. He was blind from birth and said to have been ugly, in part a result of smallpox scarring on his face. He was described as a heavily built, unusually tall man with prominent, disfigured eyes. His brothers also shared similar physical deformities, providing his literary rivals and theological opponents—most notably the poet Safwan al-Ansari—with ample material to exploit in their satirical attacks against him and his family.

His poetry, often characterized by its libertinism, drew condemnation from prominent local religious figures, including Malik ibn Dinar and al-Hasan al-Basri. Bashshar frequently exchanged satirical poetry (hija) with contemporary poets and theological opponents. As an opponent of the Mu'tazilite school of thought, he explicitly directed his satires at its traditional founder, Wasil ibn Ata.

Following the establishment of Baghdad, Bashshar relocated to the new capital around 762 and eventually became associated with the court of Caliph al-Mahdi. Due to his libertinism, al-Mahdi ordered him not to write further love poetry. Bashshar quickly violated the ban.

== Poetry and style ==
Bashshar is widely recognized as a leading figure of early Abbasid literature and a pioneer of the muhdath (modernist) movement. Despite his congenital blindness, he possessed an exceptional memory and devoted himself to mastering the Arabic poetic tradition. Historical accounts highlight his extensive retention of ancient poetry; he reportedly memorized tens of thousands of verses, taking particular pride in knowing the complete works of numerous early Arab female poets. Beyond his own compositions, Bashshar was an exacting and uncompromising literary critic. During his time in Basra, he regularly evaluated the output of his contemporaries, earning a reputation for delivering harsh and unforgiving judgments on their linguistic and stylistic choices.

He wrote in standard Arabic poetic genres, producing panegyrics (madih), satires (hija), and love poetry (ghazal). His ghazal verses gained wide popularity and were frequently set to music by singers in Basra and Baghdad. Regarding his vocabulary, Bashshar varied his diction depending on his audience. Classical sources record an incident where a critic questioned how a poet capable of highly elevated verses could also write the simplistic lines, "Rababa is the housewife / she pours vinegar into the oil" (Rabābatu rabbatu l-bayt / taṣubbu l-khalla fī z-zayt). Bashshar answered that he composed those specific lines for his maidservant, Rababa, using language she could understand.

Bashshar wrote panegyrics for various princes and caliphs, producing some of his most recognized praise poetry for Caliph al-Mahdi. As a mawla, he actively involved himself in Arab tribal politics. He frequently boasted about his affiliation with his patrons, the Uqayl tribe. Ibn 'Ashur observed that Bashshar's tribal allegiances in his poetry were fluid; he shifted his praise between tribes such as Uqayl and Azd, and he regularly participated in the traditional literary feuds between the Qahtan and Adnan confederations. When rival poets mocked his Persian ancestry, Bashshar responded by stating he was a "freedman of God" (mawla Allah) rather than a freedman of men.

Bashshar studied ilm al-kalam (Islamic theology) and initially associated with Mu'tazilite figures, including Wasil ibn Ata. He later turned against the group and wrote satires against them. This caused a literary feud with the Mu'tazilite poet Safwan al-Ansari. Al-Jahiz recorded verses attributed to Bashshar that favored fire over earth. Safwan responded by writing a poem defending clay and supporting Mu'tazilite theology. Bashshar's continuous satires against Arab poets and religious scholars drew strict scrutiny. During this period, the Abbasid government viewed individuals of Persian descent with political suspicion. His attacks on prominent Arab figures increased the accusations against him.

== Death ==
Historical accounts of Bashshar's death vary. Ammiel Alcalay in 1993 argued that Bashshar was condemned as a heretic and executed by al-Mahdi in 783. Hugh Kennedy, citing al-Tabari, relates that Ya'qub ibn Dawud had Bashshar murdered in the marshes between Basra and Baghdad.

Analyzing the political climate of the execution, Muhammad al-Tahir ibn 'Ashur stated that the Abbasid administration under al-Mahdi frequently weaponized zandaqa (heresy) charges to eliminate political dissidents and figures of Persian descent. According to Ibn 'Ashur, the primary catalyst for Bashshar's death was his relentless satirical poetry (hija), which specifically targeted Caliph al-Mahdi and his vizier Ya'qub ibn Dawud. Bashshar's political and literary enemies capitalized on his controversial verses to secure his execution under the guise of religious heresy.

== See also ==
- Arabic literature
- Ibn Gharsiya – Shu'ubi poet

== Sources cited ==
- Mallette, Karla (2021). Lives of the Great Languages: Arabic and Latin in the Medieval Mediterranean. University of Chicago Press. ISBN 978-0226796062.
- Lewis, Bernarded; Lambton, Ann K. S.; Holt, Peter Malcolm (1986). Islamic society and civilization, Volume 2B (1st ed.). Cambridge University Press. ISBN 978-0-521-21949-5.
