= Andrew Hurley (academic) =

American academic and translator

Andrew Hurley is an American academic and translator. He is primarily known as an English-language translator of Spanish literature, having translated a variety of authors, most notably the Argentine writer Jorge Luis Borges. He has published over 30 book-length translations.

Hurley obtained his doctorate in 1973 from Rice University, with a thesis on narrative strategies and reader response in the theory of the novel. He taught in the English Department of the Universidad de Puerto Rico and was named Professor Emeritus in 2009.

== Authors translated ==
- Bartolomé de las Casas (1474–1566) Spain
- Rubén Darío (1867–1916) Nicaragua
- Jorge Luis Borges (1899–1986) Argentina
- Ernesto Sabato (1911–2011) Argentina
- Margo Glantz (1930–) Mexico
- Heberto Padilla (1932–2000) Cuba
- Armando Valladares (1937–) Cuba
- Antonio Martorell (1939–) Puerto Rico
- Gustavo Sáinz (1940–) Mexico
- Reinaldo Arenas (1943–1990) Cuba
- Luce López-Baralt (1944–) Puerto Rico
- Ana Lydia Vega (1946–) Puerto Rico
- Edgardo Rodríguez Juliá (1946–) Puerto Rico
- Arturo Pérez-Reverte (1951–) Spain
- Julia Navarro (1953–) Spain
- Zoé Valdés (1959–) Cuba
- Cristina Rivera Garza (1964–) Mexico
