= Al-Saraqusti =

Abu al-Tahir Muhammad ibn Yusuf al-Tamimi al Saraqusti, known simply as Al-Saraqusti or as Ibn al-Ashtarkuwi, was a twelfth century Andalusi lexicographer, poet, philologist. He was the principal exponent of the maqamat genre in al-Andalus and his Maqamat Al-Luzumiya has been described as a “masterpiece”.

== Life ==
Details of Al-Saraqusti's life are sketchy. He was originally from Zaragoza or from the town of Astarkun (now Estercuel), however his date of birth is unknown. He lived during the Almoravid period and died in Córdoba in 1143. Al-Saraqusti was educated in the Taifa kingdom of Zaragoza and exhibited a high degree of learning. His patrons included members of the Arab aristocracy in Al-Andalus.

He was inspired to write maqamat after hearing a recitation by the Andalus poet and intellectual, al-Qudai, who had witnessed a recitation in the Baghdad garden of the celebrated poet, Al-Hariri of Basra. Thereafter, al-Saraqusti composed a number of maqamat, imitating al-Hariri's style. Of these, the Maqamat Al-Luzumiya, composed between 446/1054 and 516/1122, is the most well-known and widely studied.

He died in Córdoba in 538//1143.

== Work ==
He wrote poetry, maqama, love poems, panegyrics (formal speeches) and lexicons. Much of his work has not survived. He is noted for Maqamat al-Luzumiyya, a set of 50 narratives in rhymed prose that mimic the Oriental maqamat genre. In these anecdotes, the protagonist is a rogue or confidence trickster, named Abu Habib and his exploits are narrated by Mundir b. Humam, as he has heard them refer to Saib b. Tammam - friend and often a victim of Abu Habib's deceptions. His work first came to the attention of the West with the translation of the 5th and 6th maqama into Latin by the jurist, Asso Del Río in the Bibliotheca Arabico-aragonensis in 1762.

Four of al-Saraqusti's maqamat are set in al-Andalus, while others are set across the East – China, India and the Maghreb. The Maqamat Al-Luzumiya is the only work to have survived in its entirety. He has been described as the finest exponent of the maqama genre in al-Andalus, and his Maqamat Al-luzumiyah has been described as a “masterpiece”.

Hamilton explains that Al-Sarqusti's maqama is far from conventional for its time, noting that his maqamat do not attempt to present courtly Andalus culture as united under a culture of courtly love, but rather that "the discourse of courtly erotics - the discourse of Arabo-Andalusi power- proves to be a lie."

=== Select list of writings and translations ===
- Kitab al-Mulsalsal fi gahrib lughat al-‘Arab [The Book of the Concatentation on Rare Words in the language of the Arabs]
- Editions and translations Ignacio Jordan de Asso del Rio (trans), Bibliotecha Arabico-Aragonesa, Amsterdam, 1782 (in Latin)
- Irahim Badr Admad Dayf (trans), Al-Maqamat Al-luzumiyah ta’lif, Abi l-Tahir Muhammad ibn Yusuf al-Tamimi al Saraqusti, Alexandria, 1982
- Hasan al-Waragli (trans), Al-Maqamat Al-luzumiyah:ta’lif, Abu l-Tahir al Saraqusti, Rabat, 1995
- Ignacio Fernando Frutos, Las Sessiones de Zaragoci: Relatos Picaresques (maqama) del Siglo XII, Abu l-Tahir, el Zaragozano [The Assemblies of Zaragoza; Picturesque Stories (maqama) of the 12th century by Abu Tahir of Zaragoza], Zaragoza, 1999
- Ignacio Fernando Frutos, La Maqama Barbariyya de al-Saraqusti [The Maqamat of the Berbers], Annaquel de Estudios de Arabes, II, 1991, pp 119-129 (in Spanish)
- James T. Monroe, (ed., trans), Maqamat Al-luzumiyah by Muḥammad ibn Yūsuf Ibn al-Aštarkūwī Maqamat Al-luzumiyah, BRILL, 2002 (in English)

== See also ==
- 12th century in literature
- Literature of Al-Andalus
- Medieval literature

== Bibliography ==
- Al-Maqamat Al-Luzumiya by Abu l-Tahir Muhammad Ibn Yusuf Al-Tamimi Al-Saraqusti, Ibn Al-Astarkuwi (d. 538/1143) (Studies in Arabic literature) by James T. Monroe
- Monroe, J. T., "Al-Saraqusti, ibn al-Atarkuwi: Andalusi Lexicographer, Poet, and Author of "al-Maqamat al-Luzumiya" Journal of Arabic Literature, Vol. 28, Iss. 1, 1997, pp 1– 15.
