= Ibn al-Arif =

Andalusian writer

- ابن العريف

Personal life
- Born: Abu al-Abbas Ahmad ibn Mohammed ibn Musa ibn Ata Allah al-Mariyyi al-Sanhaji; July 24, 1088 Ceuta, Almoravid dynasty
- Died: September 27, 1141 (aged 53) Marrakesh, Almoravid dynasty
- Resting place: Marrakesh
- Notable work: Mahasin al-Majalis
- Occupation: Sufi Mystic

Religious life
- Religion: Islam

Muslim leader
- Influenced by: Ibn Masarra

Ibn al-Arif (Arabic: ابن العريف) or Abu al-Abbas Ahmad ibn Mohammed ibn Musa ibn Ata Allah al-Mariyyi al-Sanhaji, also known as Al-Urruf (July 24, 1088 – September 27, 1141) was a famous Sufi. He is especially well known as the founder of a Sufi school or tariqa, which was based on the teachings of Ibn Masarra, and as the author of Mahasin al-Majalis (The Attractions of Mystical Sessions).

== Biography ==
Ibn al-Arif was born in Ceuta, and spent most of his life in Almeria in Al-Andalus at the height of the Almoravid power. His father had once been 'arif in Tangier, that is to say he was employed as head of the guard responsible for keeping watch in the town at night. From this circumstance came his surname Ibn al-Arif. His father came from Tangier and his family belonged to the Berber tribe of the Sanhaja. Almeria was a center of Sufism at that time. He and Ibn Barrajan, another Andalusian Sufi based in Seville, gathered around themselves a large number of followers, which attracted the attention of the Almoravid authorities.

In 1141 both men were called to Marrakesh by the sultan Ali ibn Yusuf, where they were accused of "professing heterodox doctrines." Ibn al-Arif defended himself and was released, but died shortly after. According to Ibn al-Abbar, either "the sultan was convinced of Ibn al-Arif's excellence and piety and ordered him to be released and escorted to Ceuta" where he died of an illness, or by some accounts "Ibn al-Arif was poisoned on his return journey, while making the sea crossing." His tomb is in Marrakech.

== Bibliography ==
- A. J. Arberry, "Notes on the 'Mahasin al-majalis' of Ibn al-'Arif", Bulletin of the School of Oriental and African Studies, University of London, Vol. 12, No. 3/4, Oriental and African Studies Presented to Lionel David Barnett by His Colleagues, Past and Present (1948), pp. 524–532
- Mahasin al-Majalis: The attractions of mystical sessions. Ibn al-'Arif. Translated by William Elliot and Adnan K. Abdulla, England:Avebury, 1980. ISBN 978-0-86127-102-3
- Juan Antonio Pacheco Paniagua: "El Mahasin al-Mayalis de Ibn al-Arif y la Etica de Spinoza." La Ciudad de Dios. 1990. Pag. 671-687
