= Ibn Masarra =

9th-century Andalusian Muslim scholar and philosopher

Personal life
- Born: Abu 'Abd Allah Muhammad ibn 'Abd Allah ibn Masarra ibn Najih al-Jabali; 19 April 883 Córdoba, Al-Andalus
- Died: 931 Córdoba, Al-Andalus
- Notable work(s): Risālat al-Iʿtibār, Kitāb Ḫawāṣṣ al-ḥurūf
- Occupation: Ascetic, Scholar, Philosopher

Religious life
- Religion: Islam

Abu 'Abd Allah Muhammad ibn 'Abd Allah ibn Masarra ibn Najih al-Jabali (883–931) was an Andalusian Muslim ascetic and scholar. He is considered one of the first Sufis as well as one of the first philosophers of al-Andalus.

Ibn Masarra was born in Córdoba in 883. He is believed to have been Muwallad. In his youth, he travelled to Kairouan and Mecca before settling in the Sierra Morena near his home town. This is the origin of his nickname, al-Jabali ('the mountain-dweller'). After his death in 931, his followers were accused of heresy and forced to publicly recant his teachings by the Umayyad authorities. In at least one case, his books were burnt.

== Sources ==
- Arnaldez, R. (1979) The Encyclopaedia of Islam, iii, pp. 868 - 872, Leiden: Brill. ISBN 90-04-08118-6.
- Asín Palacios, M. (1972) The Mystical Philosophy of Ibn Masarra and His Followers, trans. E.H. Douglas and H.W. Yoder, Leiden: Brill.
- Asín Palacios, M. (in Spanish, 1914) Abenmassarra y su escuela : origenes de la filosofia Hispano-Musulmana. Madrid: Imprenta Iberica.
- Chopra, R.M., "SUFISM", 2016, Anuradha Prakashan, New Delhi. ISBN 978-93-85083-52-5.
- Rossi, Caterina A. Il trono - Ibn Masarrah di Cordoba (883-931), il proto-filosofo arabo d'Andalusia, 2012, Moro Editore
- Seyyed Hossein Nasr, Oliver Leaman, History of Islamic philosophy, Routledge, 1996, Chapter 20, p. 277-293 retrieved on 23-07-2010
