= Literature of al-Andalus =

The literature of al-Andalus, also known as Andalusi literature (Arabic: الأدب الأندلسي, al-adab al-andalusī), was produced in al-Andalus, or Islamic Iberia, from the Muslim conquest in 711 to either the Catholic conquest of Granada in 1492 or the expulsion of the Moors ending in 1614. Andalusi literature was written primarily in Arabic, but also in Hebrew, Latin, and Romance.

Poetry was considered the prime literary genre in Arabic. Poetic forms such as the qaṣīda and maqāma were adopted from the Mashriq or Muslim East, while forms of strophic poetry such as the muwaššaḥ and its kharja as well as the popular zajal in Andalusi vernacular Arabic were developed in al-Andalus. Andalusi strophic poetry had an impact on poetic expression in Western Europe and the wider Muslim world.

Abdellah Hilaat's World Literature Encyclopedia divides the history of al-Andalus into two periods: the period of expansion, starting with the conquest of Hispania up to the first Taifa period, and the period of recession in which al-Andalus was ruled by two major African empires: the Almoravid and the Almohad.

== Conquest ==
Arabic literature in al-Andalus began with the Umayyad conquest of Hispania starting in the year 711. The 20th century Moroccan scholar of literature Abdellah Guennoun cites the "Khutba of Tariq Ibn Ziyad", a Friday sermon of the Amazigh general Tariq ibn Ziyad to his soldiers upon landing in Iberia, as a first example.

The literature of the Muslim conquerors of Iberia, aside from the Quran, was limited to eastern strophic poetry that was popular in the early 7th century. The content of the conquerors' poetry was often boasting about noble heritage, celebrating courage in war, expressing nostalgia for homeland, or elegy for those lost in battle, though all that remains from this period is mentions and descriptions.

In contrast with the circumstances in the Visigothic invasion of Iberia, the Arabic that came with the Muslim invasion had the status of "a vehicle for a higher culture, a literate and literary civilization." From the eighth to the thirteenth century, the non-Latin forms of intellectual expression were dominant in the area.

== Umayyad period (756–1031) ==
In his History of Arabic Literature, Hanna Al-Fakhoury cites two main factors as shaping Andalusi society in the early Umayyad period: the mixing of the Arabs with other peoples and the desire to replicate the Mashriq. The bustling economy of al-Andalus allowed al-Hakam I to invest in education and literacy; he built 27 madrasas in Cordoba and sent missions to the east to procure books to be brought back to his library. al-Fakhoury cites Reinhart Dozy in his 1881 Histoire des Musulmans d'Espagne: "Almost all of Muslim Spain could read and write, while the upper class of Christian Europe could not, with the exception of the clergy." Cities—such as Córdoba, Seville, Granada, and Toledo—were the most important centers of knowledge in al-Andalus.

=== On religion ===
The east was determined to spread Islam and protect it in distant Iberia, sending religious scholars, or ulamaa. Religious study grew and spread, and the Iberian Umayyads, for political reasons, adopted the Maliki school of jurisprudence, named after the Imam Malik ibn Anas and promoted by Abd al-Rahman al-Awza'i. A religious school was established, which published Malik's Muwatta.

This school produced a number of notable scholars, prominent among whom was Ibn 'Abd al-Barr. Al-Andalus witnessed great deliberation in Quranic exegesis, or tafsir, from competing schools of jurisprudence, or fiqh. Upon his return from the east, Baqi ibn Makhlad (817-889) unsuccessfully attempted to introduce the Shafi‘i school of fiqh, though Ibn Hazm (994-1064) considered Makhlad's exegesis favorable to Tafsir al-Tabari. The Zahiri school was, however, introduced by Ibn Qasim al-Qaysi, and further supported by Mundhir ibn Sa'īd al-Ballūṭī. It was also heralded by Ibn Hazm, a polymath at the forefront of all kinds of literary production in the 11th century, widely acknowledged as the father of comparative religious studies, and who wrote Al-Fisal fi al-Milal wa al-Nihal (The Separator Concerning Religions, Heresies, and Sects).

The Muʿtazila school and philosophy also developed in al-Andalus, as attested to in the book of Ibn Mura (931).

=== On language ===
The study of language spread and was invigorated by the migration of the linguist Abu Ali al-Qali (967), who migrated from Baghdad to Cordoba and wrote a two-volume work entitled Al-Amali based on his teachings at the Mosque of Córdoba. He also authored a 5000-page compendium on language Al-Bari' and an-Nawādir. Some of his contemporaries were Qasim bin 'Abbūd ar-Riahi (968), Ibn 'Aasim (992), and Ibn al-Qūṭiyya (977). Ibn Sidah (1066) wrote Al-Mukhaṣṣaṣ and al-Muḥkam wa-al-Muḥīt al-Aʿtham.

=== On history ===
At first, Andalusi writers mixed history with legend, as Abd al-Malik Ibn Habib did. The so-called "Syrian chronicle", a history of events in the latter half of the 8th century, probably written around 800, is the earliest Arabic history of al-Andalus. It is known today, however, only as the larger part of the 11th-century Akhbār majmūʿa. The author of the Syrian chronicle is unknown, but may have been Abu Ghalib Tammam ibn Alkama, who came to al-Andalus with the Syrian army in 741. Tammam's descendant, Tammam ibn Alkama al-Wazir (d. 896), wrote poetry, including a lost urjūza on the history of al-Andalus.

They later wrote annals in the format of al-Tabari's text History of the Prophets and Kings, which Ibn Sa'd (980) complemented with contemporary annals. Most historians were interested in the history of Hispania, tracing the chronology of its history by kings and princes. Encyclopedias of people also became popular, such as encyclopedias of judges, doctors, and writers. The most important of these was told the history of al-Andalus from the Islamic conquest to the time of the author, as seen in the work of the Umayyad court historian and genealogist Ahmed ar-Razi (955) News of the Kings of al-Andalus (أخبار ملوك الأندلس وخدمتهم وغزواتهم ونكباتهم) and that of his son Isa, who continued his father's work and whom Ibn al-Qūṭiyya cited. ar-Razi was also cited by Ibn Hayyan in Al-Muqtabis. The most important historical work of this period was Said al-Andalusi's Tabaqat ul-Umam, which chronicled the history of the Greeks and the Romans as well.

=== On geography ===
Among the prominent writers in geography—besides Aḥmad ibn Muḥammad ibn Mūsa al-Rāzī, who described al-Andalus with great skill—there was Abū ʿUbayd al-Bakri (1094).

=== On math and astronomy ===
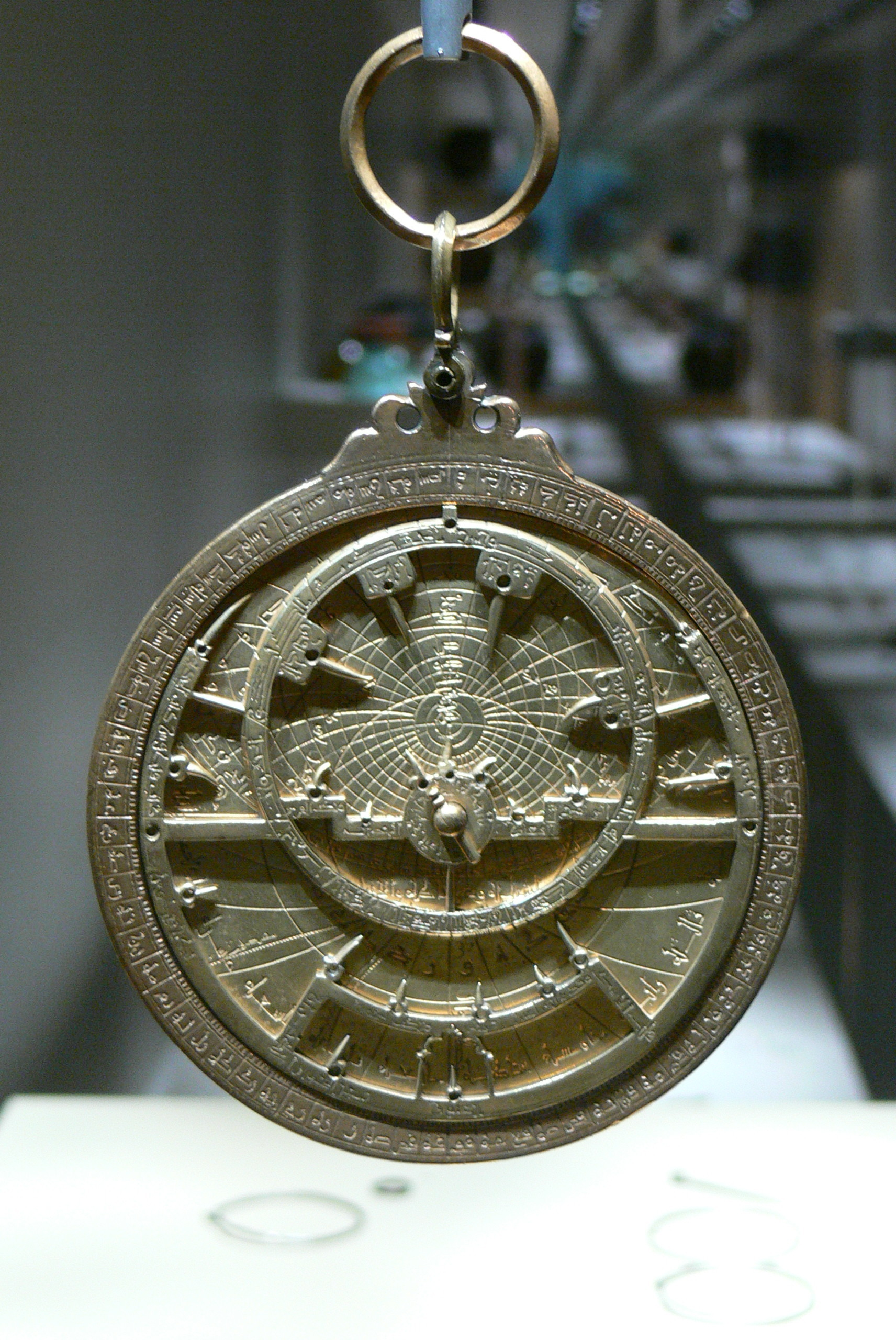
An Andalusi astrolabe from the 11th century. Ibn al-Saffar's book on astrolabes was read for centuries.

Writing in math and astronomy flourished in this period with the influence of Maslama al-Majriti (1007), who developed the work of Ptolemy and al-Khwarizmi. Ibn al-Saffar wrote about the astrolabe and influenced European science into the 15th century. Ibn al-Samh was a mathematician who also wrote about astrolabes.

=== On medicine and agriculture ===
Works in medicine and agriculture also flourished under Abd al-Rahman III. Among writers in these topics there were al-Zahrawi (1013).

Ibn al-Kattani, also known as al-Mutatabbib, wrote about medicine, philosophy, and logic.

=== On alchemy ===
Maslama ibn Qāsim al-Qurṭubī (908–964) authored Rutbat al-ḥakīm, a widely copied treatise on alchemy.

=== Literary works ===
The collection Al-ʿIqd al-Farīd by Ibn Abd Rabbih (940) could be considered the first Andalusi literary work, though its contents relate to the Mashriq.

Muhammad ibn Hani al-Andalusi al-Azdi, a North African poet, studied in al-Andalus.

The poet al-Ghazal of Jaén served as a diplomat in 840 and 845. His poetry is quoted extensively by Ibn Dihya.

=== Poetry ===
Dwight Reynolds writes of a 'rhyme revolution' in al-Andalus in the 10th and 11th centuries, in which the Christian and Jewish populations of al-Andalus encountered the rhyme schemes of Arabic poetry, with "possible connections with the sudden appearance of rhymed vernacular poetry in medieval Europe," referring to the troubadours.

From around the 9th century, the Arab and Hispanic elements of al-Andalus began to coalesce, giving birth to a new Arab literature, evident in the new poetic form: the muwashshah (pl. muwashshahat). According to Abd Allah Khalil Haylat, the Romance kharjas present in some muwashshahat marked the first instance of language mixing in Arab poetry as well as the syncretism of Arab and Hispanic cultures. The muwashshah remained sung in Standard Arabic although its scheme and meter changed and the Ibero-Romance ending was added. Some famous examples include "Lamma Bada Yatathanna" and "Jadaka al-Ghaithu". In spite of its widespread popularity and its favorability among Mashreqi critics, the muwashshah remained a form inferior to classical Arabic forms that varied only minimally in the courts of the Islamic west, due to the folksy nature of the muwashshah.

The muwashshah would typically end with a closing stanza, or a kharja, in a Romance language or Arabic vernacular—except in praise poems, in which the closing stanza would also be in Standard Arabic.

The muwashshah has gained importance recently among Orientalists because of its possible connection to early Spanish and European folk poetry and the troubadour tradition.

=== Eastern influence ===
Andalusi literature was heavily influenced by Eastern styles, with court literature often replicating eastern forms. Under Abd al-Rahman II, came Ziryab (857)—the mythic poet, artist, musician and teacher—from the Abbasid Empire in the East. He gave Andalusi society Baghdadi influence.

The qiyān were a social class of non-free women trained as entertainers. The qiyān brought from the Abbasid East were conduits of art, literature, and culture.

Among the Mashreqi poets most influential in the Maghreb was al-Mutanabbi (965), whose poetry was commented on by al-A'lam ash-Shantamari, Ibn al-Iflili, and Ibn Sidah. The court poets of Cordoba followed his footsteps in varying and mastering their craft. The maqamas of the Persian poet Badi' al-Zaman al-Hamadani were also embraced in al-Andalus, and influenced Ibn Malik, Ibn Sharaf, and Ibn al-Ashtarkuwi al-Saraqusti. The maqama known as Al-Maqama al-Qurtubiya, attributed to al-Fath ibn Khaqan, is notable as it is a poem of invective satirizing Ibn as-Sayid al-Batalyawsi. According to Jaakko Hämeen-Anttila, the use of the maqama form for invective appears to be an Andalusi innovation.

Court poetry followed tradition until the 11th century, when it took a bold new form: the Umayyad caliphs sponsored literature and worked to gather texts, as evidenced in the library of al-Hakam II. As a result, a new school of court poets appeared, most important of whom was Jaʿfar al-Muṣḥafī (982). However, urban Andalusi poetry started with Ibn Darraj al-Qastalli (1030), under Caliph al-Mansur, who burned the library of al-Hakam fearing that science and philosophy were a threat to religion. Sa'id al-Baghdadi and Yusuf bin Harun ar-Ramadi were among the most prominent of this style and period.

Ibn Shahid led a movement of poets of the aristocracy opposed to the folksy muwashshah and fanatical about eloquent poetry and orthodox Classical Arabic. He outlined his ideas in his book at-Tawabi' waz-Zawabi' (التوابع والزوابع), a fictional story about a journey through the world of the Jinn. Ibn Hazm, in his analysis of chaste poetry in The Ring of the Dove, is considered a member of this school, though his poetry is of a lower grade.

== Judeo-Andalusi literature ==
The literary traditions of Hebrew—which was used for prayer and ceremonial writings, but not for oral communication—experienced a revolution through contact with Arabic and its literary traditions. Consuelo López Morillas writes that Jews in al-Andalus "wrote Hebrew poetry using Arabic prosodic models and adopted nearly the entire range of Arabic poetic genres and stylistic devices in Hebrew," looking to Biblical Hebrew as a source for literary expression as Muslims looked to Quranic Arabic.

Jewish writers in al-Andalus were sponsored by courtiers such as Hasdai ibn Shaprut (905-975) Samuel ibn Naghrillah (993-1056). Jonah ibn Janah (990-1055) wrote a book of Hebrew.

Samuel ibn Naghrillah, Joseph ibn Naghrela, and Ibn Sahl al-Isra'ili wrote poetry in Arabic, but most Jewish writers in al-Andalus—while incorporating elements such as rhyme, meter, and themes of classical Arabic poetry—created poetry in Hebrew. In addition to a highly regarded corpus of religious poetry, poets such as Dunash ben Labrat, Moses ibn Ezra, and Solomon ibn Gabirol wrote about praise poetry about their Jewish patrons, as well and on topics traditionally considered non-Jewish, such as "carousing, nature, and love" as well as poems with homoerotic themes.

Qasmuna Bint Ismā'īl was mentioned in Ahmed Mohammed al-Maqqari's Nafah at-Tīb as well as al-Suyuti's 15th century anthology of female poets.

Bahya ibn Paquda wrote Duties of the Heart in Judeo-Arabic in Hebrew script around 1080, and Judah ha-Levi wrote the Book of Refutation and Proof on Behalf of the Despised Religion in Arabic around 1140.

Petrus Alphonsi was an Andalusi Jew who converted to Christianity under Alfonso I of Aragon in the year 1106. He wrote Dialogi contra Iudaeos, an imaginary conversation between a Christian and a Jew, and Disciplina Clericalis, a collection of Eastern sayings and fables in a frame-tale format present in Arabic literature such as Kalīla wa-Dimna. He also translated al-Khawarizmi's tables and advocated for Arabic sciences, serving as a bridge between cultures at a time when Christian Europe was opening up to "Arabic philosophical, scientific, medical, astronomical, and literary cultures."

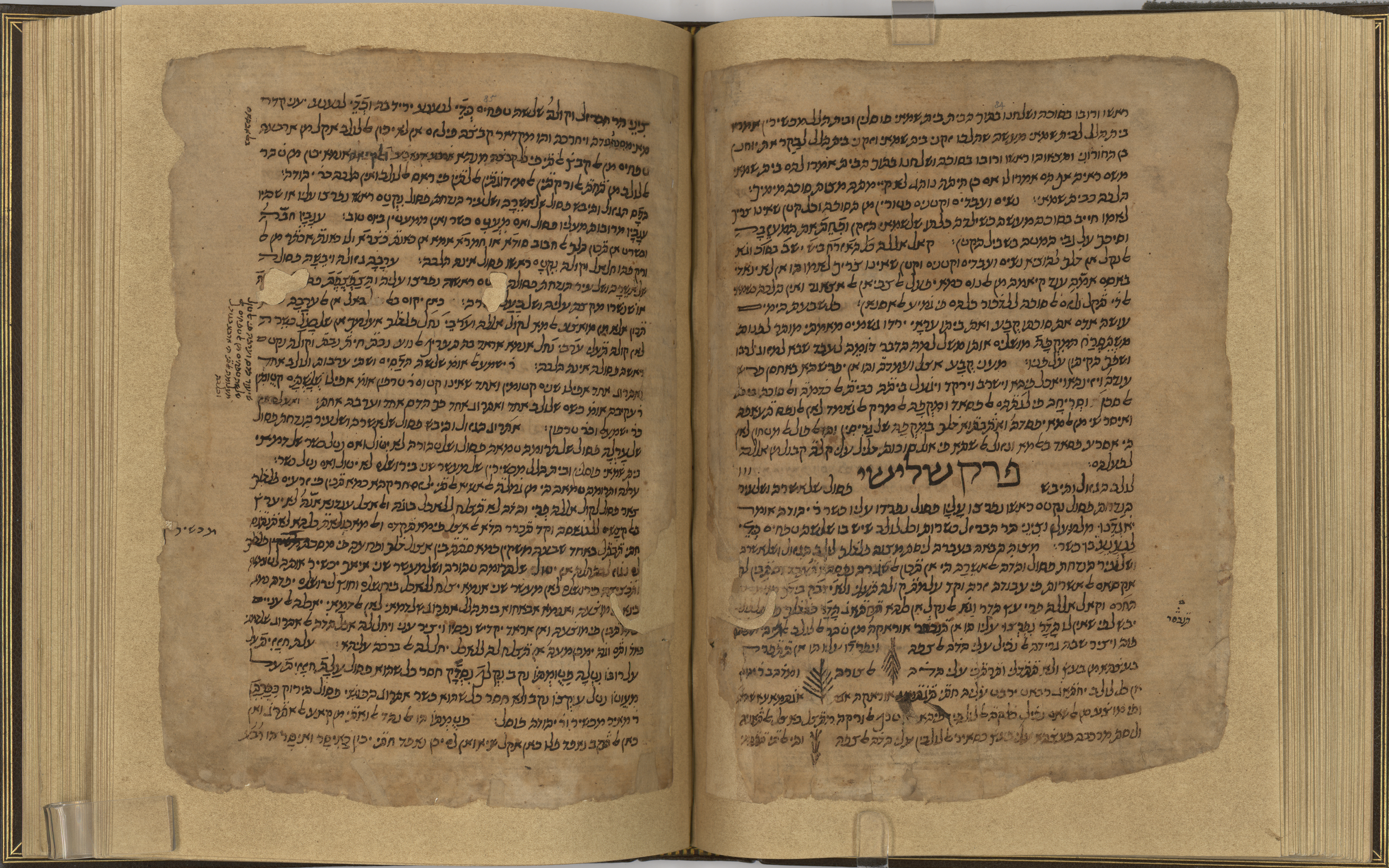
A commentary on the Mishnah handwritten by Musa bin Maymun in Judeo-Arabic with a Rashi script.

Maimonides (1135-1204), who fled al-Andalus in the Almohad period, addressed his Guide for the Perplexed to Joseph ben Judah of Ceuta.

Joseph ben Judah ibn Aknin (c. 1150 – c. 1220) was polymath and prolific writer born in Barcelona and moved to North Africa under the Almohads, settling in Fes.

Piyyut was a form of religious poetry in Hebrew performed musically with Arabic scales and meters.

== Mozarabic literature ==
The literature of the Mozarabs is bilingual in Latin and Arabic. The term Mozarab (from Arabic: مُسْتَعْرَب, romanized: musta‘rab, lit. 'Arabized'), first documented in Christian sources in the 11th century, is sometimes applied broadly to all Christians in al-Andalus, though many Christians living in Islamic Iberia resisted Arabization. Christians living under Islamic rule followed their distinctive rite of Christian liturgy, the 'Mozarabic' or, officially, Hispanic Rite.

The gradual transition from a predominantly Latinate culture to an Arabic one was already well underway in the mid-9th century, when Alvarus of Cordoba lamented that Christians were no longer using Latin. The use of Arabic by Mozarabs rapidly declined by the late 13th century, following mass Christian migrations northward from territories under Almohad rule and the reduction of Iberian territories under Muslim rule to the Emirate of Granada by 1260. Among the Latin works of early Mozarabic culture, historiography is especially important, since it constitutes the earliest record from al-Andalus of the conquest period. There are two main works, the Chronicle of 741 and the Chronicle of 754.

At the height of the Córdoban martyrs' movement (850–859), Albarus of Córdoba wrote a treatise in Latin, Indiculus luminosus, defending the martyrs and decrying the movement towards Arabic among his fellow Mozarabs. A generation later, Ḥafṣ ibn Albar al-Qūtī, finished a rhymed verse translation of the Psalms from the Latin Vulgate in 889. Although it survives in only one manuscript, it was a popular text and is quoted by Muslim and Jewish authors. Ḥafṣ also wrote a book of Christian answers to Muslim questions about their faith called The Book of the Fifty-Seven Questions. It is lost, but there are excerpts in the work of al-Qurṭubī, who praises Ḥafṣ' command of Arabic as the best among the Mozarabs. The 11th-century writer Ibn Gabirol also quotes from a lost work of Ḥafṣ al-Qūtī.

== First Taifa period (1031–1086) ==
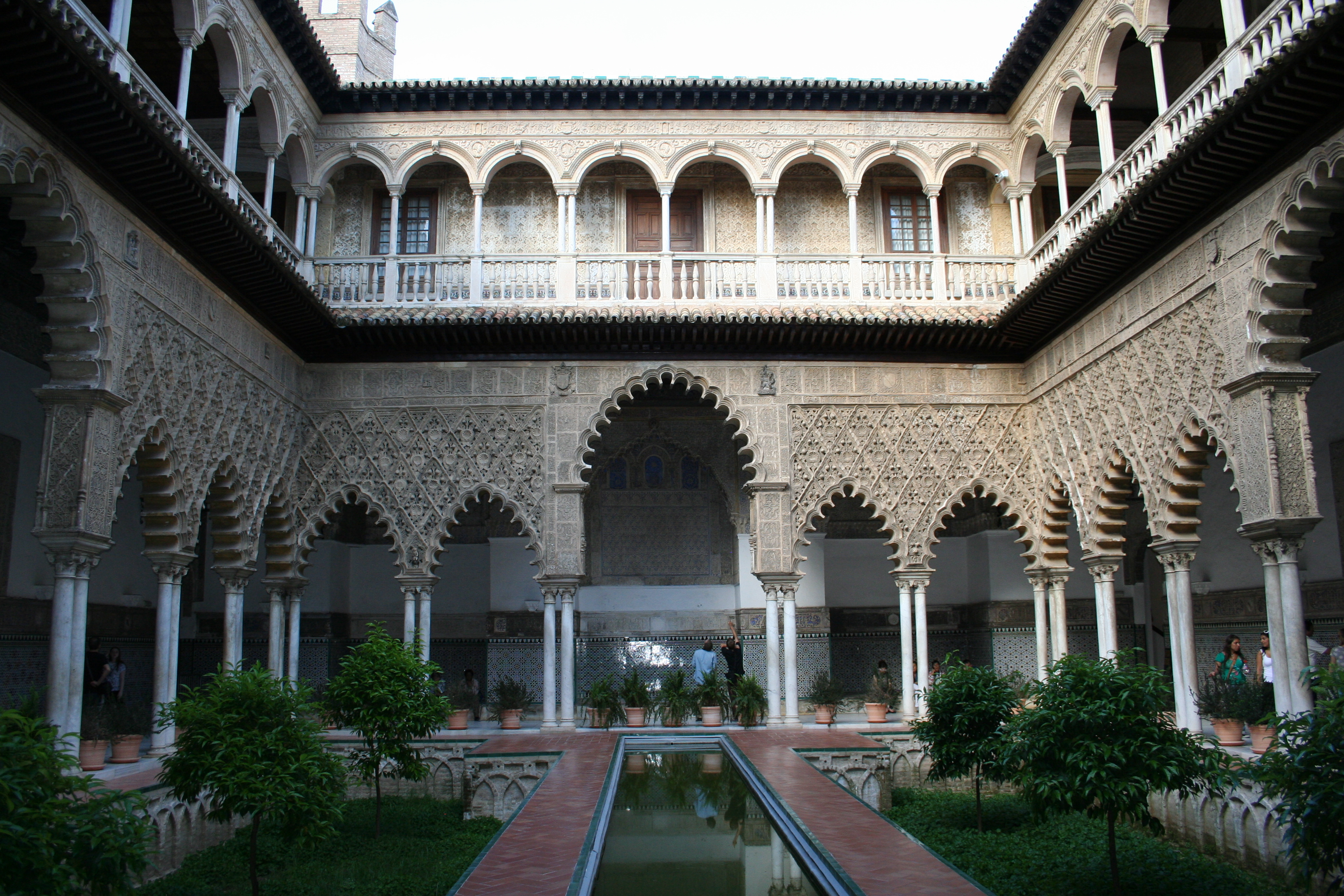
The court of al-Muatamid in Seville, which in his time was called al-Qasar al-Mubārak.

The collapse of the caliphate and the beginning of the Taifa period, did not have a negative impact on poetic production. In fact, poetry in al-Andalus reached its apex at this time. Ibn Zaydun of Cordoba, author of the Nūniyya of Ibn Zaydūn, was famously in love with Wallada bint al-Mustakfi, who inspired the poets of al-Andalus as well as those of the Emirate of Sicily, such as Ibn Hamdis. Ibn Sharaf of Qairawan and Ibn Hamdün (1139) became famous in the court of al-Mu'atasim of Almería, while Abū Isḥāq al-Ilbirī and Abd al-Majid ibn Abdun stood out in Granada.

Abu al-Hakam al-Kirmani was a doctor, mathematician, and philosopher from Cordoba; he is also credited with first bringing Brethren of Purity to al-Andalus.

Al-Mu'tamid ibn Abbad, poet king of the Abbadid Taifa of Seville, was known as a generous sponsor of the arts. Ibn Hamdis of Sicily joined al-Mu'tamid's court.

During the Taifa period, a new Arabic literary genre appeared in al-Andalus, the kutub al-filāḥa ('books of husbandry'). They are encyclopedic in intent, synthesizing practical knowledge gained from experience with the written traditions of the past. Ten agronomic writers are known from this time: al-Zahrāwī, Ibn Wāfid, Ibn Baṣṣāl, Ibn Ḥajjāj, Abu ʾl-Khayr al-Ishbīlī, al-Ṭighnarī and the anonymous author of the Kitāb fī tartīb awqāt al-ghirāsa wa ʾl-maghrūsāt.

== Almoravid period (1086–1150) ==
Literature flourished in the Almoravid period. The political unification of Morocco and al-Andalus under the Almoravid dynasty rapidly accelerated the cultural interchange between the two continents, beginning when Yusuf Bin Tashfiin sent al-Mu'tamid ibn Abbad into exile in Tangier and ultimately Aghmat.

In the Almoravid period two writers stand out: the religious scholar and judge Ayyad ben Moussa and the polymath Ibn Bajja (Avempace). Ayyad is known for having authored Kitāb al-Shifāʾ bīTaʾrif Ḥuqūq al-Muṣṭafá.

Scholars and theologians such as Ibn Barrajan were summoned to the Almoravid capital in Marrakesh where they underwent tests.

=== Poetry ===
Ibn Zaydun, al-Mu'tamid, and Muhammad ibn Ammar were among the more innovative poets of al-Andalus, breaking away from traditional Eastern styles.

The muwashshah was an important form of poetry and music in the Almoravid period. Great poets from the period are mentioned in anthologies such as Kharidat al-Qasar, Al-Mutrib, and Mu'jam as-Sifr.

In the Almoravid period, in which the fragmented taifas were united, poetry faded as they were mostly interested in religion. Only in Valencia could free poetry of the sort that spread in the Taifa period be found, while the rulers in other areas imposed traditional praise poetry on their subjects. In Valencia, there was poetry of nature and ghazal by Ibn Khafaja and poetry of nature and wine by Ibn az-Zaqqaq.

=== History ===
The historians Ibn Alqama, Ibn Hayyan, al-Bakri, Ibn Bassam, and al-Fath ibn Khaqan all lived in the Almoravid period.

Abu Bakr aṭ-Ṭurṭūshī of Tortosa went east and authored Sirāj al-Mulūk for a vizier of the Fatimid caliph.

== Almohad period (1150–1230) ==
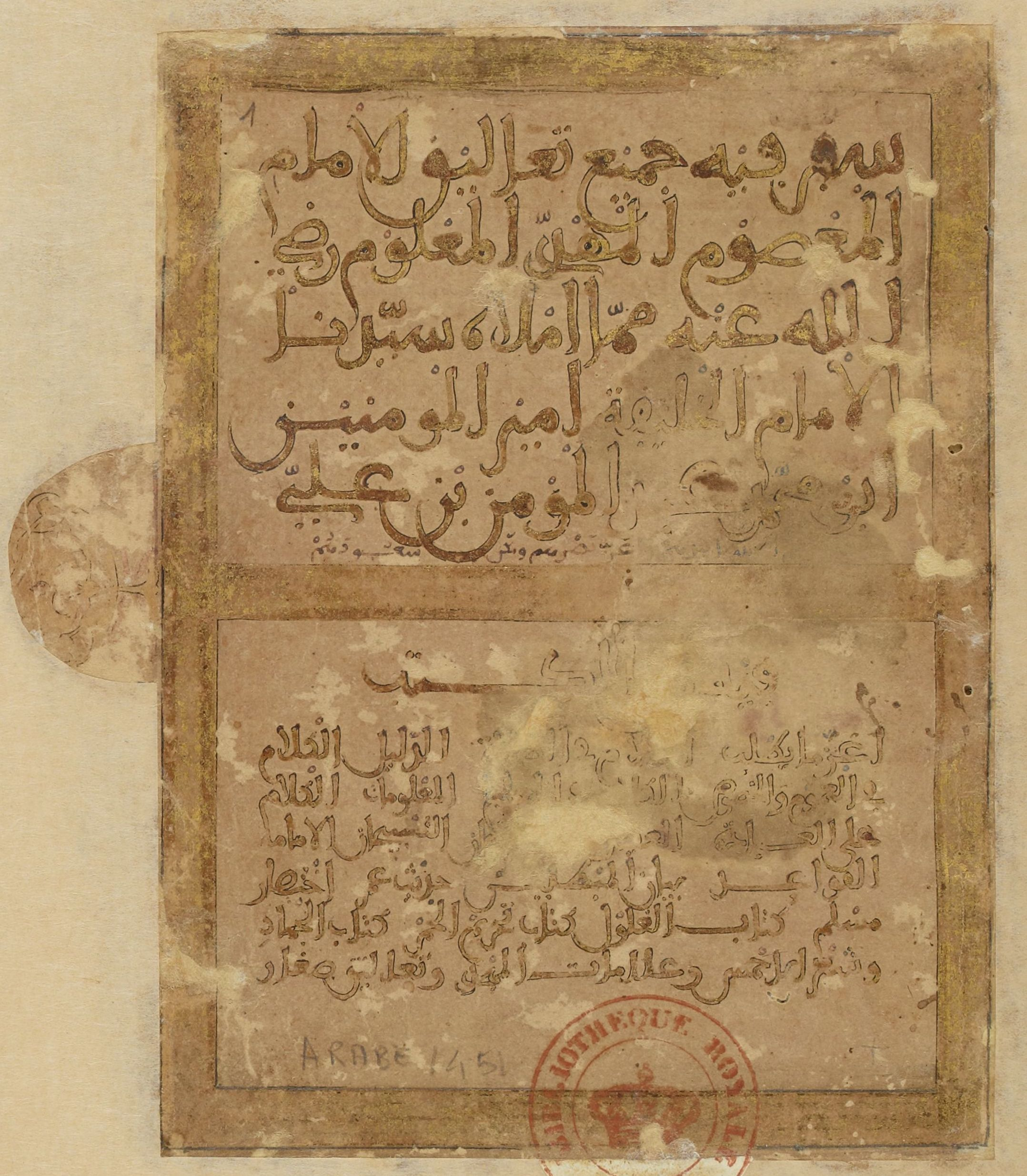
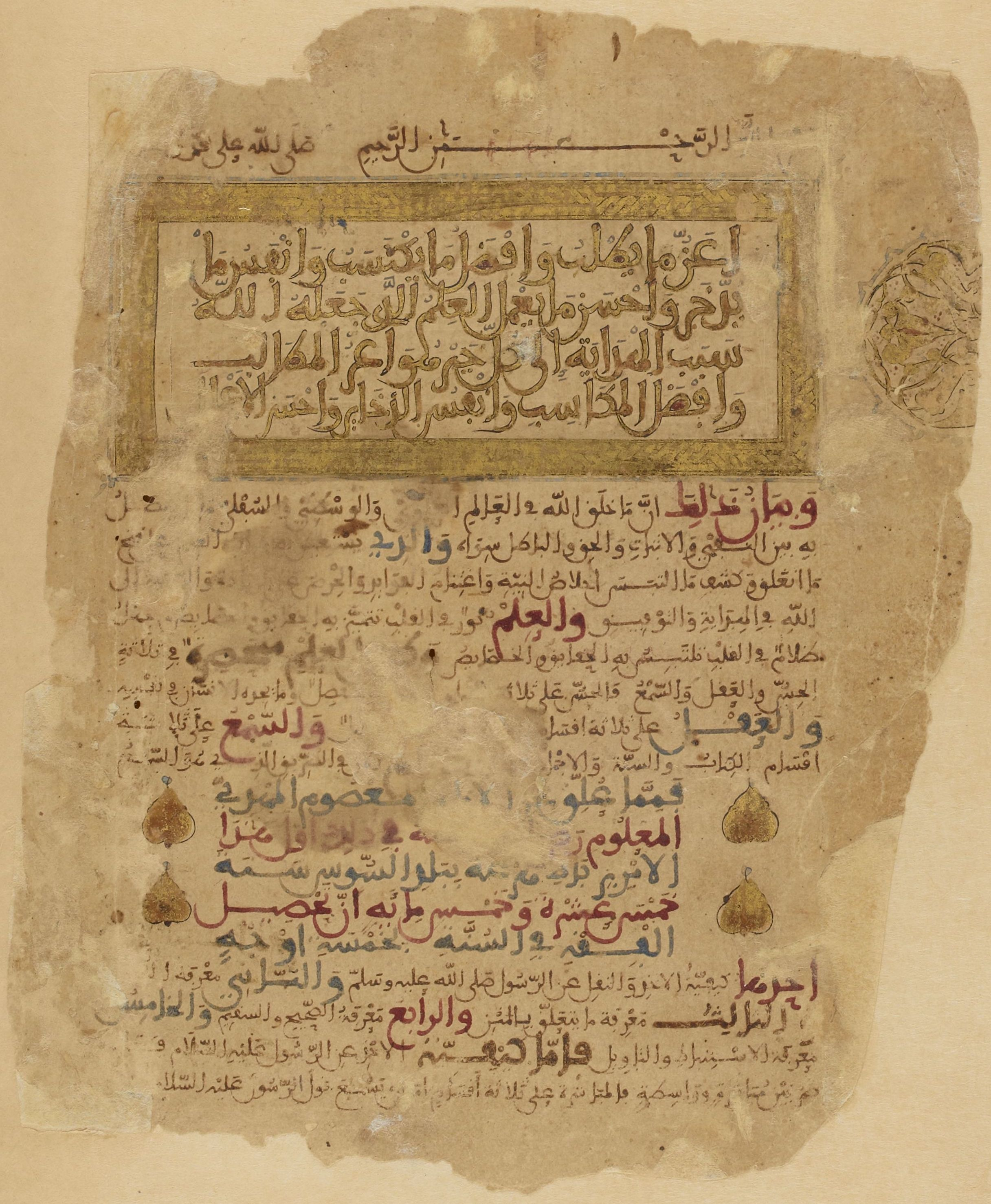
An 1183 manuscript of Ibn Tumart's E'az Ma Yutlab written in Maghrebi thuluth script.

The Almohads worked to suppress the influence of Maliki fiqh—even publicly burning copies of Muwatta Imam Malik and Maliki commentaries. They sought to disseminate the doctrine of Ibn Tumart, author of E'az Ma Yutlab (أعز ما يُطلب The Most Noble Calling), Muhadhi al-Muwatta' (محاذي الموطأ Counterpart of the Muwatta), and Talkhis Sahih Muslim (تلخيص صحيح مسلم Compendium of Sahih Muslim).

=== Almohad reforms ===
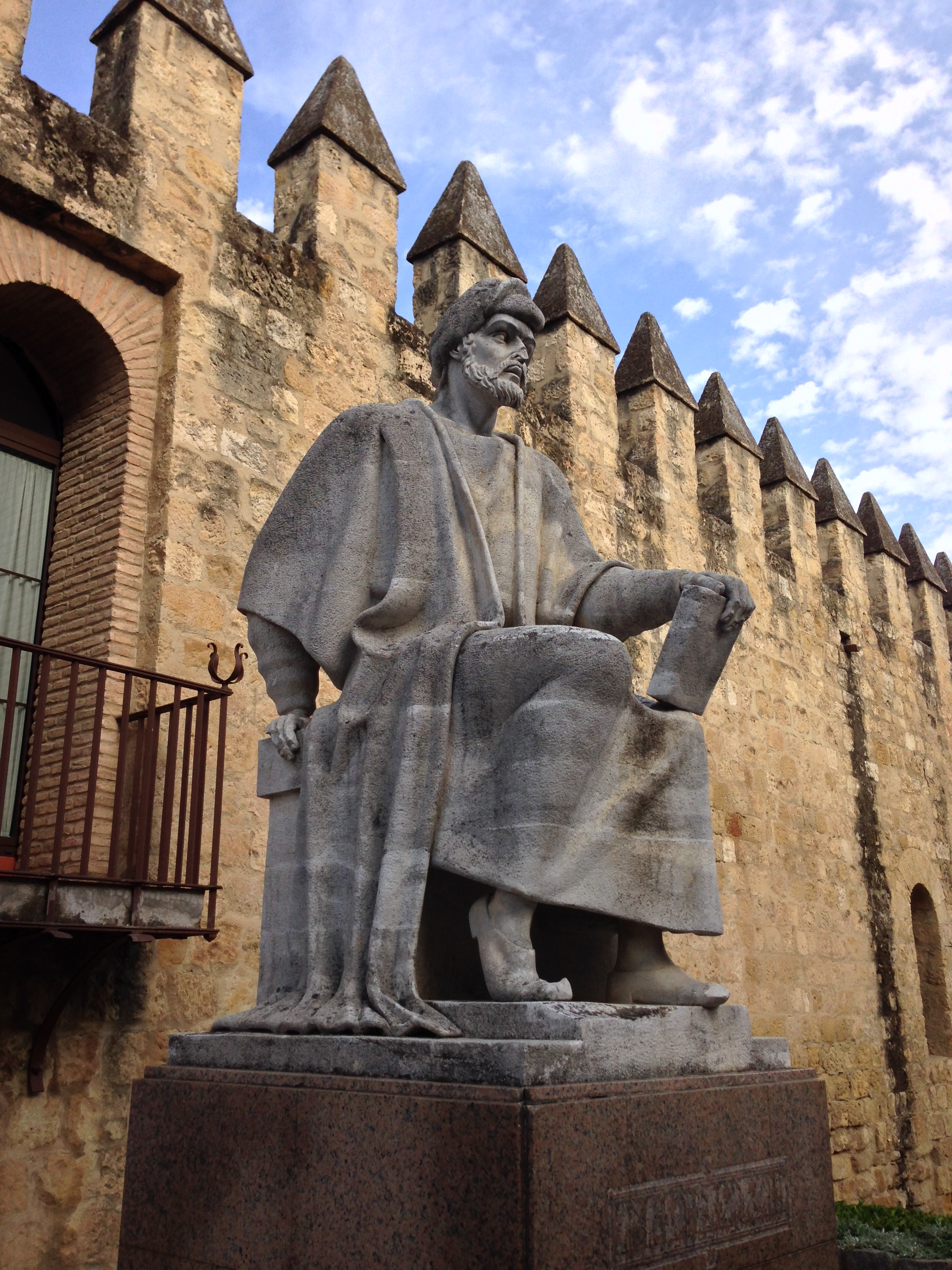
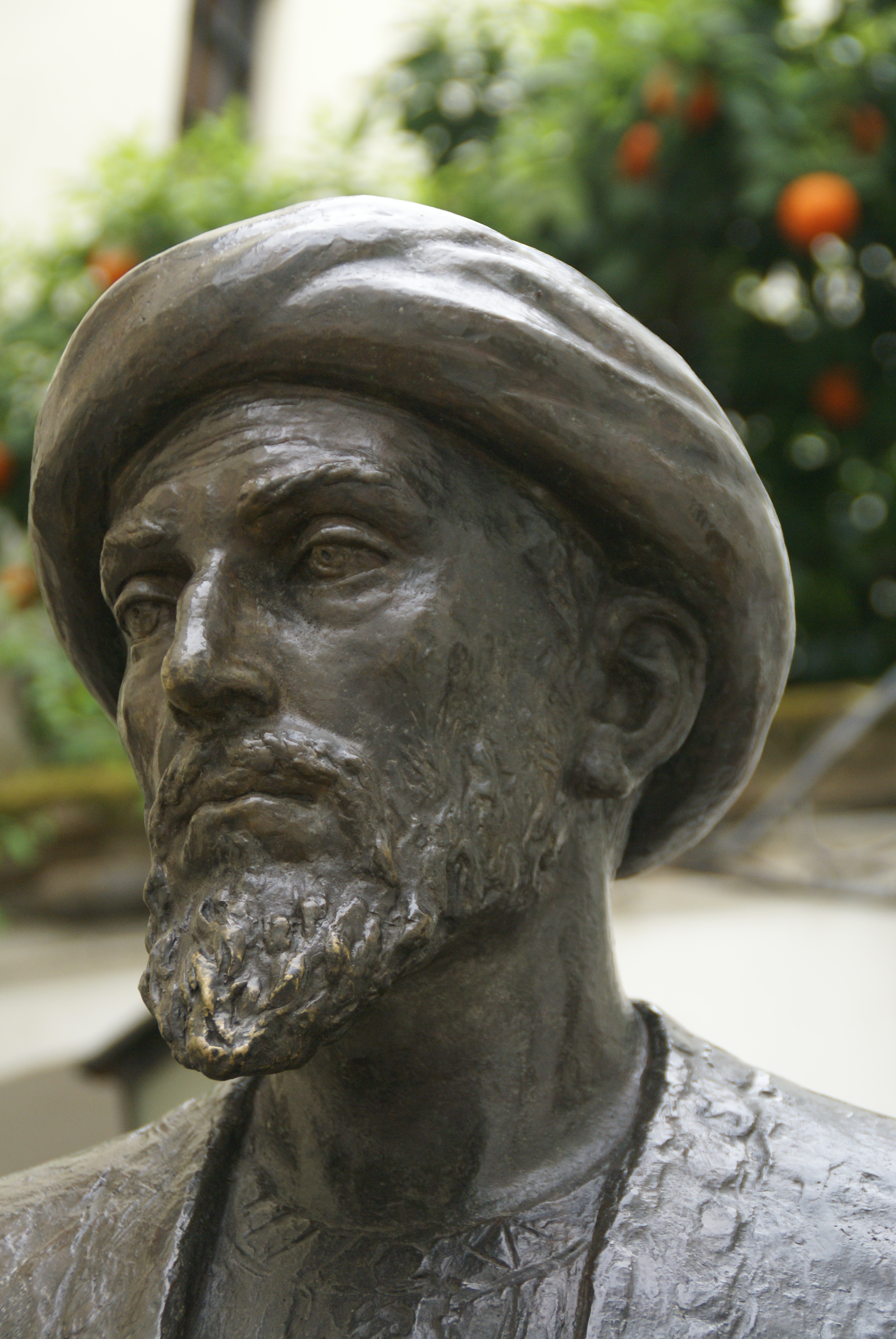
Ibn Rushd reconciled Platonian thought with Islam, while Ibn Maimun did the same with Judaism.

Literary production continued despite the devastating effect the Almohad reforms had on cultural life in their domain. Almohad universities continued the knowledge of preceding Andalusi scholars as well as ancient Greco-Roman writers; contemporary literary figures included Ibn Rushd (Averroes), Hafsa bint al-Hajj al-Rukuniyya, Ibn Tufail, Ibn Zuhr, Ibn al-Abbar, Ibn Amira and many more poets, philosophers, and scholars. The abolishment of the dhimmi status further stifled the once flourishing Jewish Andalusi cultural scene; Maimonides went east and many Jews moved to Castilian-controlled Toledo.

=== Philosophy ===
Ibn Tufail and Ibn Rushd (Averroes) were considered the main philosophers of the Almohad Caliphate and were patronized by the court. Ibn Tufail wrote the philosophical novel Hayy ibn Yaqdhan, which would later influence Robinson Crusoe. Ibn Rushd wrote his landmark work The Incoherence of the Incoherence responding directly to al-Ghazali's work The Incoherence of the Philosophers.

=== Sufism ===
With the continents united under empire, the development and institutionalization of Sufism was a bi-continental phenomenon taking place on both sides of the Strait of Gibraltar. Abu Madyan, described as "the most influential figure of the developmental period of North African Sufism," lived in the Almohad period. Ibn Arabi, venerated by many Sufis as ash-Sheikh al-Akbar, was born in Murcia and studied in Seville. His works, such as the Meccan Revelations, were highly influential. Ibn Saʿāda, also a native of Murcia, was an influential traditionist who studied in the East. He wrote a Sufi treatise, Tree of the Imagination by Which One Ascends to the Path of Intellection, in Murcia.

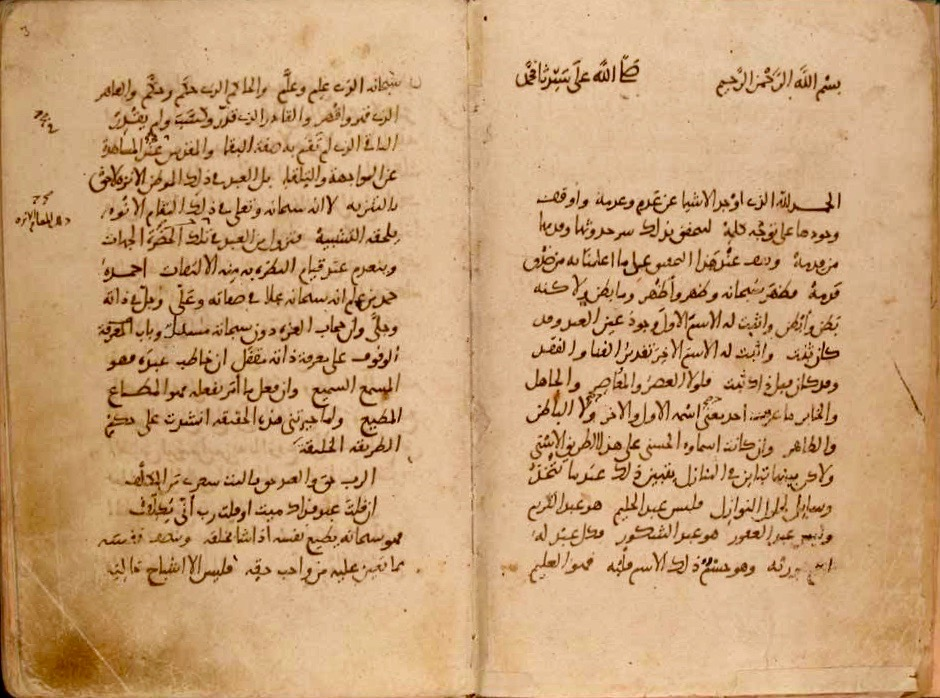
Opening pages of the Meccan Revelations, handwritten by Ibn Arabi.

When literary figures sensed the decline of Andalusi poetry, they began to gather and anthologize: Ibn Bassam wrote Dhakhīra fī mahāsin ahl al-Jazīra, al-Fath ibn Khaqan wrote " Qalā'id al-'Iqyān" (قلائد العقيان), Ibn Sa'id al-Maghribi wrote Al-Mughrib fī ḥulā l-Maghrib and Rayat al-mubarrizin wa-ghayat al-mumayyazin. Up until the departure of the Muslims from al-Andalus, there were those who carried the standard of the muwashshah, such as al-Tutili (1126) and Ibn Baqi (1145), as well as those such as Ibn Quzman (1159) who elevated zajal to the highest of artistic heights. The zajal form experienced a rebirth thanks to Ibn Quzman.

Ibn Sab'in was a Sufi scholar from Ricote who wrote the Sicilian Questions in response to the inquiries of Frederick II of Sicily.

=== Biography ===
Biographical books spread after Qadi Ayyad, and among the famous biographers there were Ibn Bashkuwāl, Abu Ja'far Ahmad ibn Yahya al-Dabbi, Ibn al-Abbar, and Ibn Zubayr al-Gharnati. Ṣafwān ibn Idrīs (d. 1202) of Murcia wrote a biographical dictionary of recent poets, Zād al-musāfir wa-ghurrat muḥayyā ʾl-adab al-sāfir.

The prophetic biography Kitab al-anwar (or Libro de las luces) of Abu al-Hasan Bakri—or else the work on which his final redaction was based—was in circulation in al-Andalus in the 12th century, when a translation into Latin was made for the Corpus Cluniacense. Sometime between the 11th and 13th centuries, the work was also translated into Andalusi Romance, presumably in the Christian North. Several aljamiado manuscripts are known, that is, Romance copies written in Arabic script. The earliest is from 1295.

=== On history ===
Ibn Sa'id al-Maghribi wrote Al-Mughrib fī ḥulā l-Maghrib citing much of what was published in the field beforehand.

Ibn Sahib al-Salat wrote al-Mann bi ʾl-imāma ʿala ʾmustaḍʿafīn bi-an jaʿalahum Allāh al-aʿimma wa-jaʿalahum al-wārithīn, although only the second volume survives, covering the years 1159–1172. He provides important information on Almohad administration. He also wrote Thawrat al-murīdīn, a lost account of the preceding taifa period.

=== On geography and travel writing ===
Muhammad al-Idrisi stood out in geography and in travel writing: Abu Hamed al-Gharnati, Ibn Jubayr, and Mohammed al-Abdari al-Hihi.

=== Poetry ===
Abu Ishaq Ibrahim al-Kanemi, an Afro-Arab poet from Kanem, was active in Seville writing panegyric qasidas for Caliph Yaqub al-Mansur. Although he spent more time in Morocco, it was his stay in Seville that has preserved his name, since he was included in the Andalusi biographical dictionaries.

In the Almohad period, the poets Ibn Sahl of Seville and al-Ruṣāfī (1177) appeared.

Abu al-Qasim ash-Shāṭibī of Játiva went to Cairo and authored Ḥirz al-amānī fī wajh al-tahānī or al-Qaṣīda al-shāṭibiyya, a didactic book in verse teaching Abu'Amr ad-Dani's al-Taysīr fī l-qirāʼāt al-sabʽ on Quranic readings of the Imams Nafiʽ, Ibn Kathir, Abu Amr, Ibn Amir, Aasim, Hamzah, and Al-Kisa'i.

==== Female poets ====
Hamda bint Ziyad al-Muaddib was a 12th-century poet from Guadix known as the "al-Khansa of al-Andalus." Hafsa bint al-Hajj al-Rukuniyya was a poet from Granada. She later worked for the Almohad caliph Abu Yusuf Yaqub al-Mansur, educating members of his family.

== Third Taifa period ==
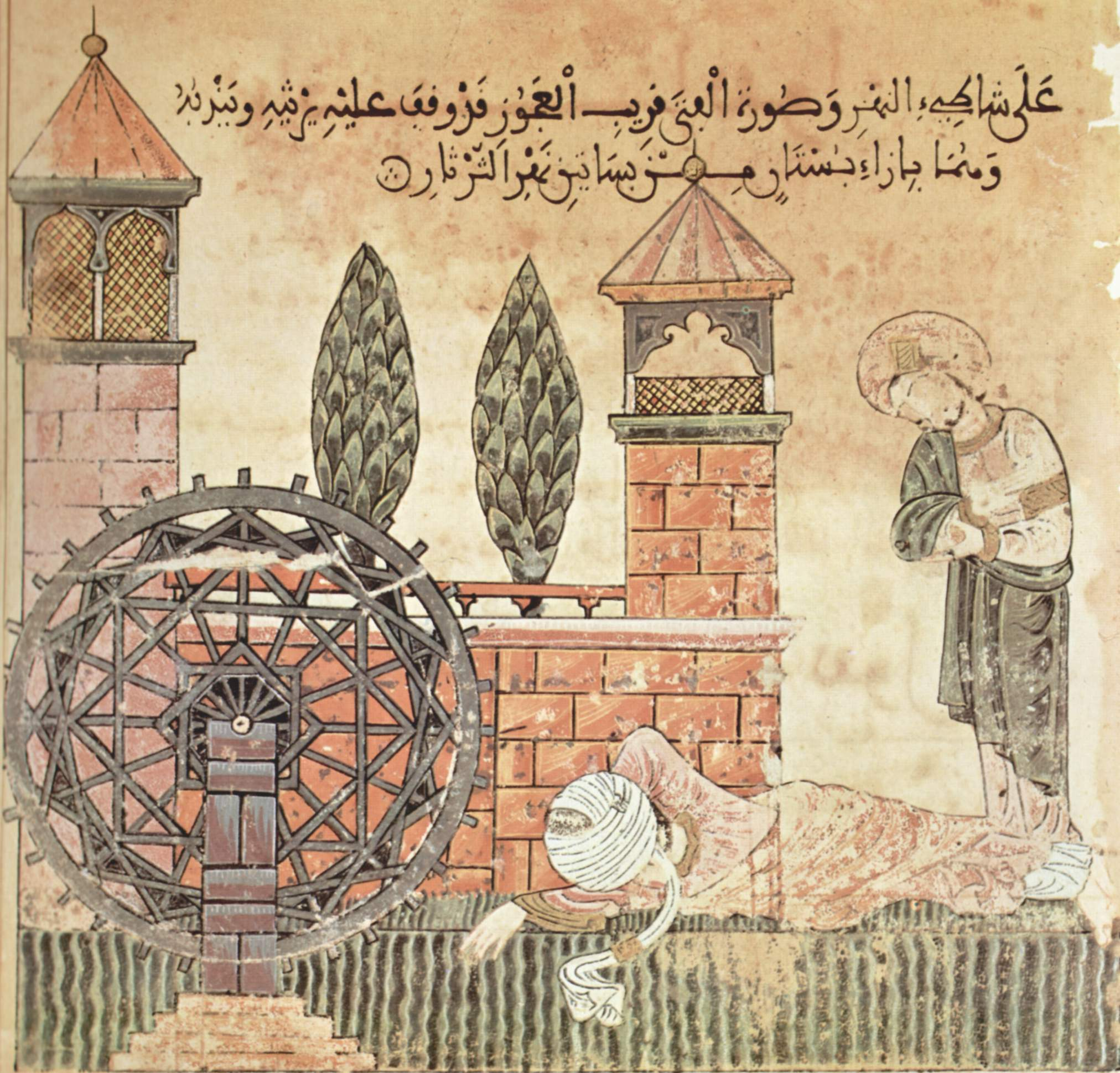
A page from the Hadith Bayad wa Riyad manuscript showing a nā‘ūra.

In the 12th and 13th centuries, the sciences—such as mathematics, astronomy, pharmacology, botany, and medicine—flourished.

Abu al-Baqa ar-Rundi wrote the qasida Elegy for al-Andalus in 1267.

Hadith Bayad wa Riyad is a 13th-century love story and one of 3 surviving illuminated manuscripts from al-Andalus.

Arabic influenced Spanish and permeated its vernacular forms. New dialects formed with their own folk literature that is studied for its effects on European poetry in the Middle Ages, and for its role in Renaissance poetry. Ramon Llull drew extensively from Arabic sciences, and first wrote his apologetic Book of the Gentile and the Three Wise Men in Arabic before Catalan and Latin.

The agriculturalist Ibn al-'Awwam, active in Seville in the late 12th century, wrote Kitab al-Filaha, considered the most comprehensive medieval book in Arabic on agriculture. Ibn Khaldun considered it a revision of Ibn Wahshiyya's Nabataean Agriculture.

== Nasrid period (1238–1492) ==
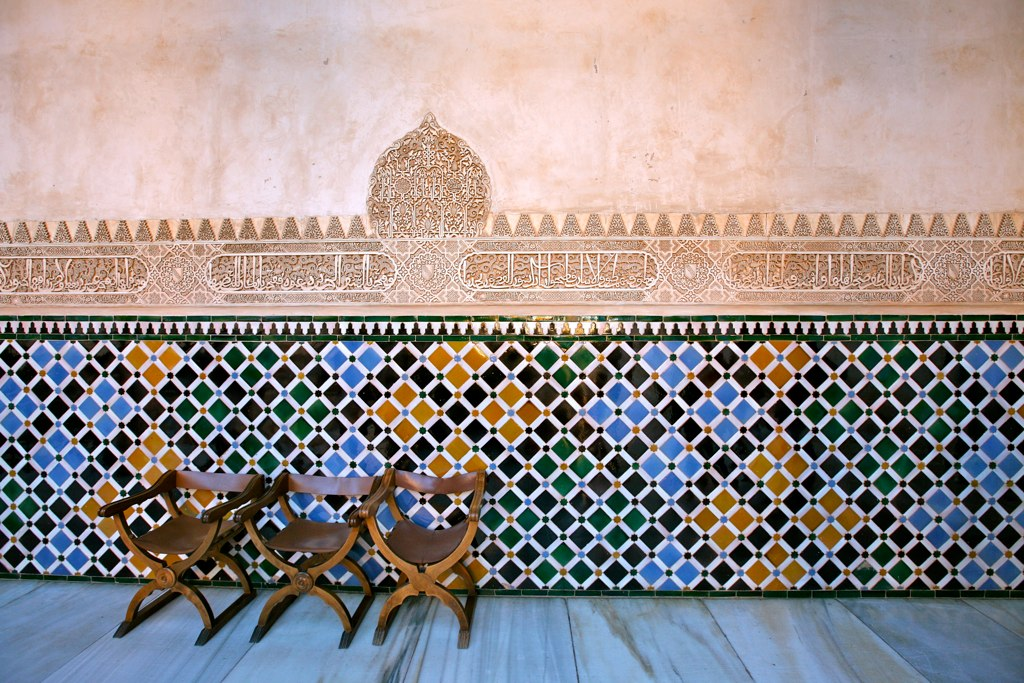
The Court of the Myrtles of the Alhambra featured 11 qasā'id by Ibn Zamrak, 8 of which remain.

According to Salah Jarrar, the "bulk of [literature in the Nasrid period] dealt and was closely involved with the political life of the state. The conflict between the last Muslim state in Spain and the Spanish states seems to have dominated every aspect of life in Granada."

The polymath and statesman Lisān ad-Dīn Ibn al-Khatīb is regarded as one of the most significant writers of the Nasrid period, covering subject such as "history, biography, the art of government, politics, geography, poetics, theology, fiqh, Sufism, grammar, medicine, veterinary medicine, agriculture, music, and falconry." The last of the poets of al-Andalus before the fall of Granada was Ibn Zamrak.

As for prose, which began in al-Andalus with Ibn Shahid and Ibn Hazm, it quickly leaned toward replicating the prose of the Mashreq. There were maqamat that replicated those of al-Hariri of Basra, such as those of Ahmed bin Abd el-Mu'min of Jerez (1222). The Almohads encouraged religious and scientific composition: in the religious sciences, Ibn Essam (1426) wrote at-Tuhfa (تحفة الحكام في نكت العقود والأحكام) and Ibn as-Sayid of Badajoz wrote about language. The works of some writers, such as the grammarian Ibn Malik and Abu Hayyan al-Gharnati, reached the Mashreq and had an influence there.

The last two Andalusi writers of the kutub al-filāḥa tradition, Ibn al-Raqqām and Ibn Luyūn, wrote in the early 14th century. The former wrote an abridged version of Ibn Wahshiyya's Nabataean Agriculture, purged of all that was pagan for the Nasrid emir.

== Andalusi literature after Catholic conquest ==
=== Suppression ===
After the Fall of Granada, Cardinal Francisco Jiménez de Cisneros oversaw the forced mass conversion of the population in the Spanish Inquisition and the burning of Andalusi manuscripts in Granada. In 1526, Charles V (Charles I of Spain)—issued an edict against "heresy" (e.g. Muslim practices by "New Christians"), including the use of Arabic. The Moriscos managed to get this suspended for forty years by the payment of a large sum (80,000 ducados). King Philip II of Spain's Pragmatica of 1 January 1567 finally banned the use of Arabic throughout Spain, leading directly to the Rebellion of the Alpujarras (1568–71).

=== Resistance ===
After Catholic conquest, Muslims in Castile, Aragon and Catalonia often used Castilian, Aragonese and Catalan dialects instead of the Andalusi Arabic dialect. Mudéjar texts were then written in Castilian and Aragonese, but in Arabic script. One example is the anonymous Poema de Yuçuf, written in Aragonese but with Aljamiado Arabic script. Most of this literature consisted of religious essays, poems, and epic, imaginary narratives. Often, popular texts were translated into this Castilian-Arabic hybrid.

Even after Muslims were forced to convert to Catholicism in 1502 in Castile and 1526 in Aragon, Moriscos continued to produce and read religious texts—notably the Morisco Quran.

Much of the literature of the Moriscos focused on affirming the place of Arabic-speaking Spaniards in Spanish history and that their culture was integral to Spain. A famous example is la Verdadera historia del rey don Rodrigo by Miguel de Luna.

== Legacy ==
=== Impact on Semitic literatures ===
Dwight Fletcher Reynolds describes a 'rhyme revolution' in al-Andalus that occurred in the late tenth or early eleventh century with the strophic muwaššah and zajal genres, which broke with the meter and mono-endrhyme of Arabic courtly song traditions. These new genres were strophic, were composed with alternating sections of longer and shorter verses, and took new rhyme schemes. This innovation was followed by further experimentation with a variety of different rhyme schemes, including internal rhymes at medial caesura. These new forms were imitated in Hebrew.

=== Impact on Western literatures ===
Alois Richard Nykl published a study in 1946 on the relationship between Hispano-Arabic poetic tradition and the old Provençal troubadours.

Douglas Young has examined the relationship of the Andalusi maqāma and the Spanish picaresque novel.

== See also ==
- Hispano-Arabic homoerotic poetry
