= Rayat al-mubarrizin wa-ghayat al-mumayyazin =

13th-century anthology of Andalusī poetry

Rāyāt al-mubarrizīn wa-ghāyāt al-mumayyazīn (Arabic: رايات المبرزين وغايات المميزين, Banners of the Champions and the Standards of the Distinguished, also translated as Pennants of the Champions) is a thirteenth-century anthology of Andalusī poetry by Ibn Said al-Maghribi. It is, in the words of Louis Crompton, 'perhaps the most important' of the various medieval Andalusī poetry anthologies. 'His aim in compiling the collection seems to have been to show that poetry produced in the West was as good as anything the East had to offer (and that stuff by Ibn Sa'id and his family was especially good)'. It survives today in only one manuscript.

== History of the compilation ==
=== Origins ===
Ibn Said compiled Rāyāt al-mubarrizīn wa-ghāyāt al-mumayyazīn in Cairo, completing it on 21 June 1243 (641 by Islamic dating). Its patron and dedicatee was Musā ibn Yaghmūr (1203-65).

The Rāyāt al-mubarrizīn wa-ghāyāt al-mumayyazīn was made as an epitome of the fifteen-volume al-Mughrib fī ḥulā l-Maghrib ('The Extraordinary Book on the Adornments of the West'), whose compilation Ibn Said completed. However, Ibn Said's prologue to the Rāyāt al-mubarrizīn wa-ghāyāt al-mumayyazīn explains that he made it before al-Mughrib fī ḥulā l-Maghrib was complete, and accordingly he took care to indicate the ultimate sources of his texts. The apparent limited circulation of the anthology and its stated purpose of honouring Ibn Said's protector, Mūsa b. Yaghmūr, suggests that the intended audience of the anthology was a small, private circle rather than a broad public.

=== Organisation ===
Ibn Said wrote that he wished to include only those few fragments "whose idea is more subtle than the West Wind, and whose language is more beautiful than a pretty face." The poems chosen are all in the classical style, following 'all the traditional conventions of rhyme, meter, and lexicon' and excluding colloquial verse.

The anthology is arranged according to home and occupation of the writer. proceeding through western, central, and eastern Spain, to Ibiza, North Africa, and then Sicily. It thus covers the whole of the Andalusian world, including Alcalá, Córdoba, Granada, Lisbon, Murcia, Zaragoza, Seville, Toledo, and Valencia. Within each region, the poems are ordered by city, and then by the poet's occupation, from the highest social rank to the lowest. Authors include bureaucrats, gentlemen, kings, ministers, and scholars; the book is evidence of how important love poetry was to the educated of al-Andalus. In all, the anthology contains 314 poetic fragments by 145 identifiable poets; Ibn Said also included a prologue and a short epilogue, along with occasional comments on the texts and brief notes on the poets.

According to A. J. Arberry.

the author has exercised, and everywhere demonstrates, his personal judgement, first as to the poets selected for quotation, and secondly as to the passages chosen. He was not able to deny himself the immodest pleasure of quoting from his own writings, for more extensively than from those of any other poet; and the entire section devoted to Alcalá la Real is taken up with the products of members of his family ... It seems doubtful whether more than a small handful of poems have been cited in their entirety; most of the quotations are quite brief extracts---in some instances a single stanza---from what were originally lengthy compositions.

=== Sources ===
For poetry composed in the lifetime of Ibn Said and his father, much of the material clearly comes from oral sources. At times the transmitters of the verses are named, among them Ibn Al-Abbār, Ibn Al-Ḥusayn, Abū-l-Maḥāsin al-Dimashqī, and Al-Tīfāshī. Ibn Said's named written sources are as follows.

==== Occidental anthologies ====
- Ibn ‘Abd Rabbi-hi, Kitāb al-‘iqd al farīd
- Abū-l-Walīd Ḥabīb al-Ḥimyarī, al-Badī‘ fī faḍl (or faṣl, or waṣf) al-rabī‘
- Ibn Bassām, Kitāb al-dhakhīra
- Ibn Khāqān, Qalā’id al-‘Iqyān and Maṭmaḥ al-anfus
- Umayya b. Abī-l-Ṣalt, Ḥadīqa
- al-Hijāri, Hadīqa
- Ibn al-Imām, Simṭ al-jumān
- Ṣafwān b. Idrīs, Zād al-musāfir
- al-Mallāḥī, Ta’rīkh fī ‘ulamā' Ilbīra’
- al-Shaqundī, Ẓarf al-ẓurafā'
- Abū-l-‘Abbās al-Jurāwī, Kitāb ṣafwat al-adab
- Abū-l-Khaṭṭāb b. Diḥya, al-Muṭrib
- al-Khushanī, Kitāb zamān al-rabī‘
- Abū-l-Ḥajjāj al-Bayyāsī, unnamed work
- Taqyīd by a Granadan writer

==== Oriental anthologies ====
- ʻAbd al-Malik ibn Muḥammad Thaʻālibī, Yatīmat al-dahr
- Ḥarīrī, Durrat al-ghawwāṣ
- al-‘Imād al-lṣfahānī, Kharīdat al-qaṣr

==== Diwāns ====
- Ibn Hāni’
- Ibn ‘Ammār
- Ibn Ḥamdīs
- Ibn Khafāja
- Ibn al-Zaqqāq
- al-Tuṭīlī al-A‘ma
- Ibn Waḍḍāḥ al-Buqayra
- Abū-l-Rabi‘ b. ‘Abd Allāh b. ‘Abd al-Mu’min
- Ibn ‘Iyāḍ, al-Maqāma al-dawḥiyya

== Manuscript ==
When the text was edited by Emilio García Gómez, he had access to photographs of a single manuscript, whose whereabouts and classmark he did not know but which he thought to be in Istanbul. The codex contained 272 pages (numbered as such rather than as folios), on which were written two texts: pp. 1-201 contain the text Laṭā’if al-dhakhīra wa-ẓarā’if al-jazīra, an epitome of Ibn Bassām's Dhakhīra by Abū-Makārim As‘ad al-Khaṭīr ibn Mammātī (d. 606/1209), and pp. 202-72 the Rāyāt al-mubarrizīn wa-ghāyāt al-mumayyazīn. The manuscript was copied by the noted scribe Yūsuf ibn Muḥammad, probably in Egypt; he finished the first text on 1 December 1702 CE and the second on 18 May 1703.

== Example ==
An excerpt from a poem of the Pennants, "The Tailor's Apprentice" by Ibn Kharuf (d. 1205), in Arberry's translation, serves as one example:

His stool, the steed he rides upon
Rejoices in its champion
Armed with the needle that he plies
Sharp as the lashes of his eyes.

The needle o'er the silken dress
Careers with wondrous nimbleness
As down the sky bright meteors snake.

With threads of lightening in their wake.

== Influence ==
Gómez's translation greatly influenced modern Spanish poetry, not least Lorca, whose El diván del Tamarit was particularly indebted to the book.

== Editions and translations ==
- El libro de las banderas de los campeones, de Ibn Saʿid al-Magribī, ed. and trans. by Emilio García Gómez, 2nd edn, Series mayor, 39 (Barcelona: Seix Barral, 1978), ISBN 8432238406 [first publ. Madrid: Instituto de Valencia de Don Juan, 1942] (edition and Spanish translation).
- Moorish Poetry: A Translation of 'The Pennants', an Anthology Compiled in 1243 by the Andalusian Ibn Sa'id, trans. by A. J. Arberry (Cambridge: Cambridge University Press, 1953). (A selection of poems in English translation. Arberry seems to have avoided including poems with particularly explicit sexual (especially homosexual) content, however.)
- Ibn Said al-Andalusi, Rayat al-Mubarrazin wa gayat al-Mummayazin, ed. by Numan Abd al-Mutaal al-Qadi (El Cairo: Yina al-Turat al-Islami, 1973) [رايات المبرزين وغايات المميزين, لابن سعيد الاندلسي ؛ تحقيق الدكتور النعمان عبد المتعال القاضي. القاهرة, المجلس الأعلى للشؤون الإسلامية،]
- Ibn Saʿīd al-Andalūsī, Abū al-Ḥasan ʿAlī ibn Mūsā (1987). Rāyāt al-mubarrizīn wa-ghāyāt al-mumayyizīn. Tlasdar. [علي بن موسى بن سعيد الأندلسي أبو الحسن (1987). [Muḥammad Riḍwān Dāyah] حمد رضوان الداية (ed.). رايات المبرزين وغايات المميزين. طلاس للدراسات والترجمة والنشر.]
- The Banners of the Champions of Ibn Said al-Maghribi, translated by James Bellamy and Patricia Steiner (Madison: Hispanic Seminary of Medieval Studies, 1988).
