= Al-Mursi =

Al-Mursī is an Arabic nisba meaning "from Murcia". It may refer to:

- Ibn al-Zaqqaq, sometimes wrongly called al-Mursi (fl. 12th century), Andalusi poet
- Ibn Sa'ada, Abu 'Abd Allah Muhammad ibn Yusuf al-Mursi (d. 1170), Islamic traditionist
- Ibn Hubaysh, Abu'l-Qasim 'Abd al-Rahman ibn Muhammad al-Mursi (b. 1110), Islamic traditionist
- Safwan ibn Idris, Abu Bakr ibn Ibrahim al-Tujibi al-Mursi al-Katib (d. 1201), Andalusi poet
- Abu al-Abbas al-Mursi (d. 1287), Sufi mystic
- Ibn Sab'in, Abd al-Haqq ibn Ibrahim al-'Akki al-Mursi (d. 1271), Sufi philosopher

== See also ==
- Mursi
