= Abu Ja'far Ahmad ibn Abd al-Malik ibn Sa'id =

Poet

- أبو جعفر أحمد بن عبد الملك بن سعيد
- Died: 1163
- Occupations: Poet, Court Secretary
- Writing career
- Language: Arabic

Abū Jaʿfar Aḥmad ibn ʿAbd al-Malik Ibn Saʿīd (died 1163) is best known as a poet, and lover of Ḥafṣa bint al-Ḥājj ar-Rakūniyya (c. 1135–1191).

== Biography ==
Abū Jaʿfar is said to have been taught by, amongst others, the twelfth-century poet Ibn Khafāja. He served as a prominent court secretary for the Almohad governor of Granada, Abū Saʿid ʿUthmān. "Unfortunately for Abū Jaʿfar, his powerful boss also fell in love with Ḥafṣa, and our poet's position in the ensuing love triangle seems to have forced him to flee Granada." Joining Ibn Mardanīsh's rebellion against Almohad rule in al-Andalus, Abū Jaʿfar was captured and in 1163 executed.

== Work ==
An example of Abū Jaʿfar's poetry, as translated by A. J. Arberry, is 'Wine, my Love':

Ho, bring her hither, happy boy,
For in her presence is my joy,
But (and does love need further proof?)
I grieve when she remains aloof.

I speak upon the wine: when she
Departs, the bowl weeps bitterly,
But when the glass beholds her near
It broadly smiles for the good cheer.
