= Battle of Fahs al-Jullab =

Battle between the Almohads and the king of Murcia

| Date | 15 October 1165 |
| Location | Alhama de Murcia, Spain |
| Result | Almohad victory |

Belligerents
| Almohad Caliphate | Taifa of Murcia |

Commanders and leaders
| Abu Hafs Umar ibn Yahya al-Hintati | Muhammad ibn Mardanis |

The Battle of Faḥṣ al-Jullāb (Note: Also spelled Faḥṣ al-Jallāb.) was fought on Thursday 15 October 1165 (Note: 7 Dhu ʾl-Ḥijja 560.) between the invading Almohads and the king of Murcia, Ibn Mardanīsh.

An Almohad army under sayyids Abū Ḥafṣ ʿUmar and Abū Saʿīd ʿUthmān, the brothers of the Caliph Abū Yaʿḳūb Yūsuf, went on the offensive against Ibn Mardanīsh in the summer of 1165. They captured Andújar in September, harried Galera, Caravaca, Baza and Sierra de Segura, then captured Cúllar and Vélez on their approach to Murcia.

Ibn Mardanīsh called a general levy and sought the assistance of his Christian allies from the Kingdom of Castile to augment his standing army of salaried troops. The Almohad armies were composed of Berbers, Arabs and slaves. The core was composed of Berbers from Tinmal. Others came from Harga and Hintāta tribes. Arab reinforcements, mostly from the Riyāḥ, Athbaj and Zughba clans of the Banū Hilāl, had been brought over from Marrakesh in July.

Ibn Mardanīsh went out to defend Lorca and was met by an Almohad force advancing from the castle of Vélez. Battle was met 10 miles (16 km) south of Murcia, near Alhama (al-Ḥamma) at a place called the "merchant's field", Faḥṣ al-Jullāb, in the valley of the Guadalentín. Ibn Mardanīsh and his men were routed. The king took refuge in the city while the victors plundered the countryside. The Almohads were incapable of seriously threatening the walled city. Letters announcing the victory were sent to Seville (Note: Abū Saʿīd ʿUthmān was the governor of Seville.) and Marrakesh, the latter arriving on 31 October. In the letters, the battle was compared to the Battle of Dhū Ḳār, when the Arabs routed the Persians in the time before Islam.

After the battle, Abū Saʿīd ʿUthmān went to Córdoba while Abū Ḥafṣ ʿUmar took most of the army to Marrakesh, where the caliph rewarded each soldier with a turban, a cloak and a bolt of linen, each cavalryman with 20 gold dīnārs and each leader of the Almohad and Arab troops with 100 gold dīnārs. The names of all were recorded.

Although some Christians participated on the side of Murcia, the battle is known only from Muslim sources. Among those histories that describe the battle are Ibn ʿIdhārī's Bayān, Ibn Ṣāḥib al-Ṣalāt's Mann, Ibn al-Abbār's Takmila, Ṣafwān ibn Idrīs's Zād, al-Marrākushī's Muʿjib, al-Ṣafadī's Wāfī, Ibn Abī Zarʿ's Anīs, Ibn al-Athīr's Kāmil, Ibn al-Khaṭīb's Iḥāṭa and al-Maḳḳarī's Nafḥ.

== Works cited ==
- Alubudi, Jasim (1993–1994). "Dos viajes inéditos de Ṣafwān b. Idrīs". Sharq al-Andalus. 10–11: 211–243.
- Buresi, Pascal; El Aallaoui, Hicham (2013). Governing the Empire: Provincial Administration in the Almohad Caliphate (1224-1269). Brill.
- González Cavero, Ignacio (2007). "Una revisión de la figura de Ibn Mardanish: su alianza con el reino de Castilla y la oposición frente a los almohades". Miscelánea Medieval Murciana. 31: 95–110.
- Kennedy, Hugh (1996). Muslim Spain and Portugal: A Political History of al-Andalus. Routledge.
- Vallvé Bermejo, Joaquín (1972). "La división territorial en la España musulmana (II): la cora de "Tudmīr" (Murcia)". Al-Andalus. 37 (1): 145–193.
