= Ibn Amira =

Berber Andalusian Scholar and poet

- أبو المطرف أحمد بن عبد الله بن محمد بن الحسين ابن عميرة المخزومي
- Born: Abū al-Muṭarrif Aḥmad bin Abdallāh bin al-Ḥusayn bin Aḥmad Ibn Amīra al-Makhzūmī; 1186; Alzira
- Died: 1258 or 1260; Tunis
- Occupations: Historian, Scholar, Poet
- Employer: Almohad Sultan
- Title: Qadi of Mallorca

Academic work
- Era: Almohad period
- Notable works: Tarij Mayurqa (History of Mallorca)

Ibn Amira (Arabic: ابن عمیرہ)(1186- 1258/60), full name: Abū al-Muṭarrif Aḥmad bin Abdallāh bin al-Ḥusayn bin Aḥmad Ibn Amīra al-Makhzūmī (Arabic: أبو المطرف أحمد بن عبد الله بن محمد بن الحسين ابن عميرة المخزومي) was a historian, poet, and scholar of law from al-Andalus during the reign of the Almohads. Ibn Amira was Qadi of Mallorca and worked for the Almohad sultan in Valencia and Seville. He moved to modern-day Morocco in 1239/40 (after the fall of Valencia in 1238) and continued to work for the sultan there.

== Biography ==
Ibn Amira al-Makhzumi was born at Alzira in the province of Valencia, now part of Spain. He was born into a well-known Berber family established in al-Andalus, in Shatiba (now Xàtiva, Valencia), by the 11th century. He started his studies in Alzira and focused on hadith, fiqh (Islamic jurisprudence), and literature. He was taught by some of the most famous scholars of his day, such as the traditionist Abu l-Rabi Ibn Salim and the grammarian al-Shalawbin.

== Works ==
Ibn Amira was also the author of a manuscript about the history of Mallorca, Tarij Mayurqa. The manuscript (written between 1203 and 1232) was translated into Spanish by the historian Guillem Rosselló Bordoy.

== Sources ==
- Manuel Boix and Josep Palàcios: Ali b. Atiyya Ibn al-Zaqqaq, Ahmad b. Abd Allah Ibn Amira, Ibrahim b. Abi l-Fath Ibn Hafaya Alzira, Valencia, Bromera, 1988. ISBN 84-7660-021-6
- Öz, Mustafa (1999). İBN AMÎRE - An article published in 19th volume of TDV İslâm Ansiklopedisi (in Turkish). Vol. 19. Istanbul: İslâm Ansiklopedisi. pp. 310–311.
