= Siege of Almería =

Siege of Almería may refer to:

- Siege of Almería (1147), successful siege by León–Castile and allies
- Siege of Almería (1157), successful siege by the Almohads
- Siege of Almería (1309), unsuccessful siege by Castile and Aragon
