= Ibn Darraj al-Qastalli =

Andalusi poet of Berber origin (958–1030)

- ابن دراج، احمد بن محمد
- Born: March , 958 near Tavira, Portugal or Jaen, Spain
- Died: 1030 (aged 71–72); Dénia, Spain
- Other names: Aḥmad Ibn-Muḥammad Ibn-Darrāǧ al-Qasṭallī
- Occupation: Poet

Abu Umar Ahmad ibn Muhammad ibn al-Asi ibn Ahmad ibn Sulayman ibn Isa ibn Darraj al-Qastalli (Arabic: أبوعمر أحمد بن محمد بن العاصي بن أحمد بن سليمان بن عيسى بن الدرّاج القسطلي, 958–1030) was an Andalusi poet. He was an author of courtly poetry for the Córdoban military leader Almanzor and after 1018, for the rulers of the Taifa of Zaragoza. He is mentioned by the Muslim philosopher Al-Tha'alibi in his work Kitāb Yatīmat saying "He was for the country Andalus that which al-Mutanabbi was for Syria, a poet of the highest order, and equally elegant in what he said and wrote."

Ibn Darraj was born in March 958 into a noble Andalusian family (which might have been Sanhaja Berber in origin) There is some confusion with respect to his place of birth. Al-Qasṭallī means native of Qasṭallī, a city in Spain at the time. The medieval cartographer Muhammad al-Idrisi places Kastalla on the coast, fourteen miles east of Tavira. The Spanish historian José Antonio Conde thought that the city was now called Castellar in the Spanish province of Jaen.

He became court poet of Almanzor in 992, where his was admitted due to his improvisational abilities. His poetry was dedicated to extol the military campaigns of Almanzor against the Christian Kingdoms. Apart from its literary value, his poetry also appears to match the historical record and provides insight into the exploits of Almanzor.

After the death of Almanzor, he continued in the service of Almanzor's son Abd al-Malik al-Muzaffar, who he accompanied in his campaign against Leon and Catalonia. However, in 1008, a civil war broke out and he was forced to emigrate, first to Cueta in 1008 with the Hammudids, then to the Taifa of Zaragoza, where he started work as vizier-secretary and court poet for Al-Mundir I in 1018.

Again as court poet, he extolled the military exploits of Mundir I. He also sang at the wedding organized by Mundir in 1021 between Count Berenguer Ramon I of Barcelona and Sancha Sánchez, daughter of Sancho Garcia of Castile.

After Mundir I was succeeded by his son Yahya ibn al-Mundhir in 1022, Ibn Darraj continued his service as a poet in the court until his departure to Valencia and then to Dénia in 1028, where he died in 1030.
