= Magda al-Nowaihi =

Magda M. al-Nowaihi (died June 4, 2002) was a literary critic, associate professor of Arabic Literature at Columbia University. In 2000 she was characterized as "the keenest voice in Arab literary criticism in the United States today."

Al-Nowaihi studied as an undergraduate at the American University in Cairo. She gained her PhD from Harvard University with a thesis, directed by Wolfhart Heinrichs, on the poetry of Ibn Khafājah, revised and published in 1992.

She died of cancer aged 44. A book of essays was published in her honor in 2008.

== Works ==
- Death and the meaningfulness of life in a poem by Ibn Khaf-ajah, 1990.
- The poetry of Ibn Khafajah: a literary analysis, 1992
