= Emilio García Gómez =

Spanish Arabist, literary historian and critic (1905–1995)

The Most Excellent Emilio García Gómez 1st Count of Alixares
- Born: 4 June 1905; Madrid, Spain
- Died: 31 May 1995 (aged 89); Madrid, Spain

Seat V of the Real Academia Española
- In office 22 November 1945 – 31 May 1995
- Preceded by: Antonio Machado (Note: Machado was elected for the position in 1927 but never took the seat)
- Succeeded by: Juan Luis Cebrián

Emilio García Gómez, 1st Count of Alixares (4 June 1905 – 31 May 1995) was a Spanish Arabist, literary historian and critic, whose talent as a poet enriched his many translations from Arabic.

== Life ==
Coat of Arms of 1st Count of Alixares

Emilio García Gómez decided to pursue Arabic as a career after attending Arabic language classes taught by Prof. Miguel Asín Palacios at the Complutense University of Madrid. He had been a student of law. In his Arabic studies he was mentored by the professors Julián Ribera y Tarragó, and by Asín.

Recipient of a scholarship to Cairo he studied there under Prof. Ahmad Zaki Pasha and the Egyptian writer Taha Husayn. His doctoral thesis on the Alexander legend in the Maghrib won the Fastenrath Prize. In 1930 he became Professor of Arabic at the University of Granada, until he returned to Madrid in 1944.

While living in Granada he had become friends with classical music composer Manuel de Falla and with poet Federico García Lorca, both aficionados of Flamenco. Inspired by the translations of Gómez, García Lorca wrote his Diván de Tamarit. Here, the poet was not following in imitation of a traditional Arabic verse but rather paying it contemporary homage, García Gómez favorably observed.

He was again in Egypt during 1947. García Gómez spent the following year in Damascus, Syria, where he was appointed to the Arabic Academy [Al-Majma' Al-Ilmi Al-Arabi], a notable distinction for a westerner. He gave lectures at the University of Cairo in 1951 during celebrations on its silver jubilee.

Later, he served as the Spanish Ambassador to Iraq (Baghdad), Lebanon (Beirut), and Turkey (Ankara), as well as to Afghanistan during the years 1958 to 1969.

Throughout his career, Emilio García Gómez was widely admired. and received several prestigious academic and literary awards. He lived until the age of ninety.

On 7 October 1994 García Gómez was raised into the Spanish nobility by King Juan Carlos I and received the hereditary title conde de los Alixares (English: Count of Alixares). García Gómez died in 1995, and since he had no successors his title became extinct.

== Works ==
A major focus of his academic work was Arabic poetry, acting as a literary historian and critic as well as translator. As a Spanish Arabist, of course, he interpret Muslim culture generally. A. J. Arberry praised the "wide scholarship and literary judgement that has characterized Prof. Gómez's numerous contributions to Islamic studies." In a series of articles published over many years, he developed a theory of the origin and development of the Andaluz Arabic muwashshahat genre of popular strophic verse, which is often sung. It is said to be related to the Mozarabic jarchas (Arabic kharja) poetic form.

His many translations of Arabic poetry were received with acclaim by the literary public, as well as by many Spanish poets, including Federico García Lorca, and artists, e.g., Manuel de Falla. Particular mention may be made of his translation of Ibn Said al-Maghribi's 1243 anthology of poetry, the Pennants of the Champions, and of later translation of and commentary on the Andalusian poet and scholar Ibn Hazm (994–1064). García Gómez also published a collection of his literary essays, Silla del Moro y nuevas escenas andaluzas, which drew on his experiences while living in Granada during the early thirties.

Assisting two of his mentor professors, García Gómez edited shorter, more popular versions (though still rigorous) of the well-known tomes by Julián Ribera y Tarragó and Miguel Asín Palacios Later, he and Prof. Rafael Lapesa produced several articles on their teacher and elder Miguel Asín Palacios.

After returning from his travels to the Middle East in the late 1940s and early 1950s, he published (under the title Los Días) his translation of the Egyptian writer Taha Husayn's recent autobiographical work Al-Ayyam. In 1955 he translated another modern work of Arabic literature, about an Egyptian rural prosecutor.

Though his main academic work was in Arabic poetry, he also approached the social issues involved in understanding the Islamic presence in medieval Spain. García Gómez collaborated with the French historian Évariste Lévi-Provençal in editing and translating an anonymous chronicle written in medieval Córdoba under the rule of Caliph 'Abd al-Rahman III. He also translated Lévi-Provençal's well known history of Muslim Spain into Spanish. For the first volume he wrote a prologue commenting on the significance of the Muslim period in Spanish history, where he refers approvingly to the work of Américo Castro.

In his later years García Gómez labored on the various facets of the literary events surrounding the Alhambra, an architectural gem, site of the government offices and the residence of the Muslim rulers of Granada, where the Islamic presence lingered the longest.

== Selected publications ==
- Un texto árabe occidental de la leyenda de Alejandro (Madrid 1929). Fastenrath Award
- Poemas arábigoandaluces (Madrid 1930): a translation of Ibn Said's 13th century Pennants of the Champions. Translated into English by Franzen, Cola (1989). Poems of Arab Andalusia. San Francisco: City Lights Books. ISBN 978-0-87286-242-5. Translated into Arabic by Hussein Mones as Ash-Shi'r al-Andalusi (Cairo 2nd ed. 1956).
- Qasidas de Andalucía, puestas en verso castellano (Madrid 1940).
- Cinco poetas musulmanes (Madrid 1945).
- El collar de la poloma, tratado sobre el amor y los amantes de Ibn Hazm de Cordoba (Madrid 1952), prologue by José Ortega y Gasset.
- Poesía arábigoandaluza, breve síntesis histórica (Madrid 1952).
- Silla del moro y nuevas escenas andaluzas (Madrid 1948, reprint Buenos Aires, Espasa-Calpe, 1954).
- Las jarchas romances de la serie árabe en su marco (Madrid 1965).
- Poemas árabes en los muros y fuentes de la Alhambra (Madrid 1985).
- Poesías / Ibn Al-Zaqqāq; edición y traducción en verso [del árabe] (Madrid 1986).
- Foco de antigua luz sobre la Alhambra (Madrid 1988).

Collaborations

- Una crónica anónima de 'Abd al-Rahman III al-Nasir (Madrid-Granada 1950), co-authored with Évariste Lévi-Provençal.
- En el centario del nacimiento de don Miguel Asín (Madrid: CSIC 1969), with Rafael Lapesa; also in the journal Al Andalus (1969).

== See also ==
- Arabic Poetry
- Miguel Asín Palacios
- Ramón Menéndez Pidal
- Federico García Lorca
- Manuel de Falla
- James T. Monroe

Spanish nobility
New creation	Count of Alixares; 1994–1995	Extinct
