= Siege of Almería (1157) =

- Part of the Reconquista and Almohad wars in the Iberian Peninsula
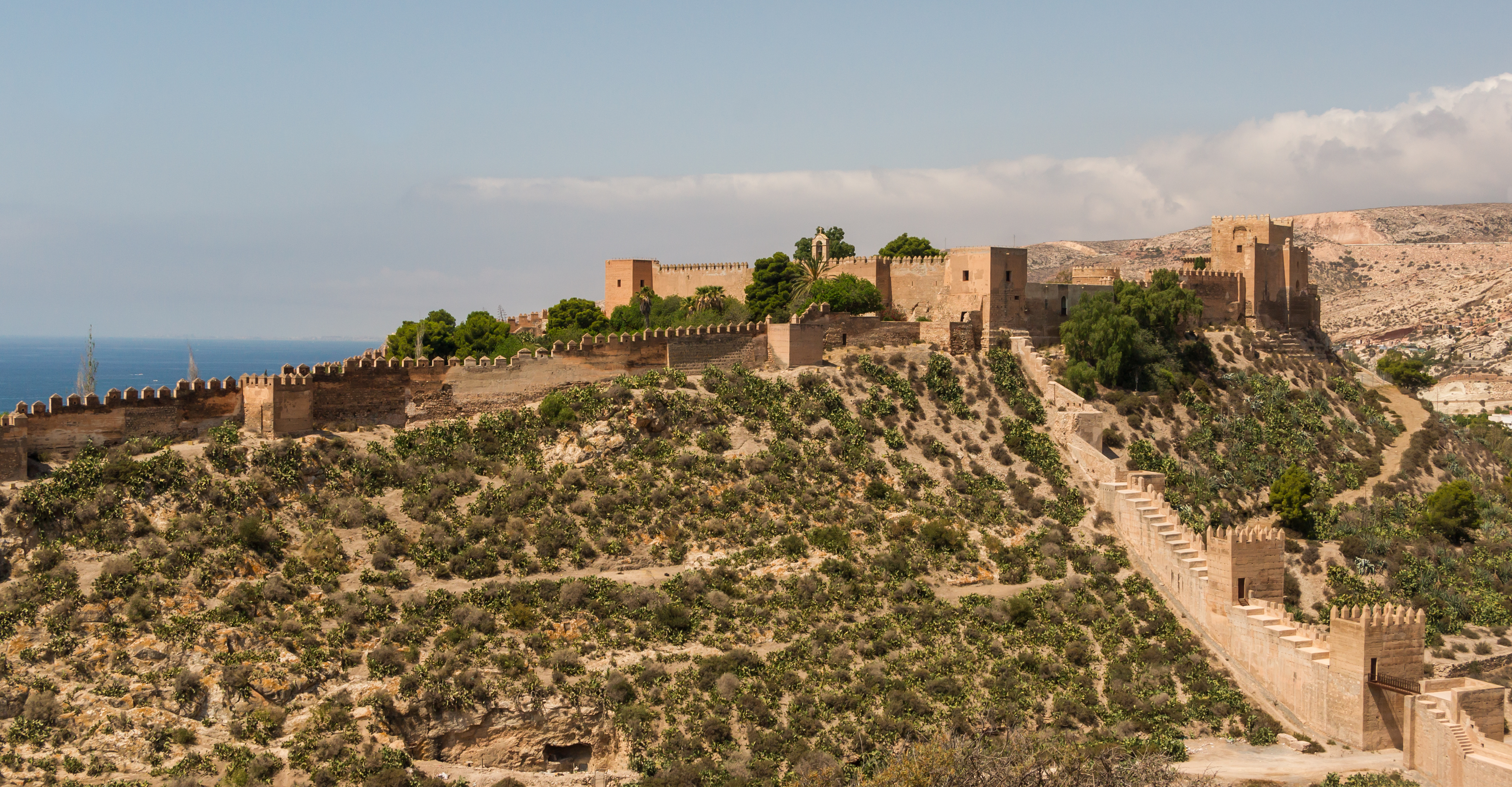
- The citadel of Almeria
Date	January – August 1157
Location	Almería
Result	Almohad victory

Belligerents
Almohad Caliphate	Kingdom of Castile; Kingdom of León; Republic of Genoa; Taifa of Murcia

Commanders and leaders
Abu Sa'eed; Abdullah bin Sulieman; Ahmed bin Milhan (defected)	Alfonso VII; Muhammad ibn Mardanīsh

Strength
Unknown	Relief force: 12,000 Castilian knights 6,000 Moors

Casualties and losses
Unknown	Heavy

The Siege of Almeria was the successful capture of Almeria by the Almohads in 1157. The city was held and defended by a garrison composed of Leonese and Genoese troops. The Almohads and their Andalusian ally put the city under siege and repelled an attempt by King Alfonso VII of León and Castile to relieve the city. After seven months, the Leonese and Genoese garrison surrendered.

== Background ==
In 1157, Almeria had been under the control of Christians for a decade. In 1147, Alfonso VII took advantage of the political turmoil in Andalusia and captured the city by means of a siege. In the campaign, Alfonso was supported by forces from the Kingdom of Navarre, the Principality of Catalonia, and the Republic of Genoa. After a siege of three months, Almeria was captured in October 1147.

After the capture of Granada in 1156, the Almohads believed that it was time to take control of the port city Almeria as its location threatened Almohad naval operations. As a preliminary operation prior to attack, the Almohad Caliph, Abd al-Mu'min, dispatched a reconnaissance force to Almeria and discovered that its garrison was small and its defenses were weak.

== Siege ==
In January 1157, a military force composed of Almohads and Andalusians advanced by land to Almeria. The Almohads were commanded by Abu Sa’eed while the Andalusians were led by Ahmed bin Milhan. In addition to these forces, an Almohad naval taskforce commanded by Abdullah bin Sulieman was used to block access to the city from the Mediterranean Sea.

In preparation for a siege, Sa’eed established a camp on a hill that overlooked the city. A wall protected by a trench was constructed from the Almohad camp down the hillside to the sea. Trebuchets were set-up and the siege of the city began.

By means of a sortie, the defenders of Almeria attacked the Muslim siegers but were driven back. As the siege progressed, the garrison sent messengers to Alfonso VII seeking assistance. Ultimately, the defenders of the city were forced to retreat into the citadel where the siege continued.

After Alfonso VII learned of the siege, he hurried to relieve the besieged city with an army of 12,000 knights supported by 6,000 Muslims led by the King of the Taifa of Murcia, ibn Mardanīsh. During the siege, a quarrel developed between the Almohad naval commander, bin Sulieman and the Andalusian military commander, bin Milhan. As a result of the dispute, the Andalusians defected and threw their support to the relieving force of Murcia led by ibn Mardanīsh.

The Almohad siege continued despite the reinvigorated attempt of Alfonso VII and ibn Mardanīsh to relieve the city. Alfonso VII and ibn Mardanīsh ultimately withdrew in frustration, leaving the city's fate to the Almohads. In August, the exhausted garrison surrendered in exchange for their lives

The Christian garrison returned to their homeland by sea. King Alfonso VII died on August 21 on the road to Toledo while ibn Mardanīsh returned to his taifa At Almeria, the Almohads captured many war machines.
