= Nuniyya of Ibn Zaydun =

11th-century poem

The "Nuniyya of Ibn Zaydun" (Arabic: نونية ابن زيدون; incipit: أَضْحَى التَنائي بَديلاً مِن تَدانينا) is a 52–verse nūniyya, or a monorhyme poem in nūn (ن), by the 11th century Andalusi poet Ibn Zaydun (d. 1071). It has been described by Michael Sells as the "quintessential Arabic love poem." It is one of the most famous pieces of Andalusi literature.

The poem was written to Wallada bint al-Mustakfi. It is a poem of longing.

== Structure ==
Raymond K. Farrin identifies a ring composition in the poem and divides the poem into five discrete sections: A – B – C – B¹ – A¹. According to Farrin:

Section A introduces the idea of the poet's separation from his beloved, Wallāda, and culminates in a mood of hopelessness and resignation. Morning is associated with this somber reality. In section B, Ibn Zaydân addresses Wallāda formally and recalls that their nights together were blissful. Section C constitutes the heart of the poem, a paean to Wallāda's beauty and royal stature. At the end of C, the poet switches to an intimate form of address, having implied that, her nobility notwithstanding, he is an equal by the agency of sensual love. B¹ and A¹ correspond thematically to sections B and A, yet the tone becomes increasingly personal at the end of the poem, consonant with private subject matter and an appeal for a reply. The ghazal concludes at the point when figurative night, filled with its dreams of Wallāda and hopes for a response, is about to be replaced by the bleak morning hour and hopelessness of the introduction, suggesting an awareness on behalf of the poet that word from the beloved will not likely come.

== Poetic devices ==
=== Antithesis ===
Farrin notes that in the two hemistiches of verse 14, the most often quoted verse of the poem, there appear five instances of ṭibāq (طِباق 'antithesis'):

Verse 14
hālat lifaqdikumu ayyāmunā, faghadat	حالَت لِفَقدِكُمُ أَيّامُنا فَغَدَت
Our days have been transformed by your absence so that they have become
sūdan, wa kānat bikum bīdan layālīnā	سوداً وَكانَت بِكُم بيضاً لَيالينا
black-morned whereas with you our nights were white

instances of ṭibāq
hālat - kānat	faqdikum - bikum	ayyāmunā - layālīnā	sūdan - bīdan	kum - na
transformed - were	your absence - with you	our days - our nights	black - white	your - our

== Editions ==
- ديوان ابن زيدون Dīwān Ibn Zaydun, ed. Karam al-Bustānī (Beirut, 1964)
- ديوان ابن زيدون ورسائله Ibn Zaydun, Dīwān wa Rasā'il, ed. 'Ali 'Abdu'l-'Azym (Cairo, 1957)

== Translations ==
=== English ===
- Monroe, James T. Hispano-Arabic Poetry (Berkeley and Los Angeles, 1974), pp. 178-87, (50 verses)
- NykI, A. R. Hispano-Arabic Poetry and Its Relations with the Old Provençal Troubadours (Baltimore, 1946), pp. 115-16 (50 verses)

=== French ===
- Cour, A. Un Poete Arabe d'Andalousie, Ibn Zaydan (Constantinople, 1920), pp. 70-74, (49 verses)
