= Luis Delgado (musician) =

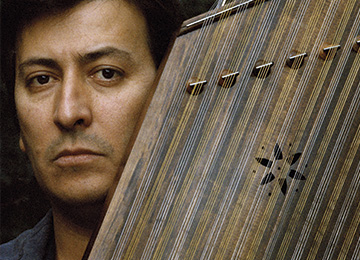

Background information
- Born: 16 July 1956 (age 68); Madrid, Spain
- Origin: Madrid, Spain
- Genres: Andalusian music
- Years active: 1978—present
- Website: http://www.luisdelgado.net

Luis Delgado (born 16 July 1956 in Madrid) is a Spanish instrumentalist, composer, and producer. Delgado's work combines organic elements from Arab-Andalusian music, oriental and Medieval styles with electronic elements from the avant-garde.

Delgado formed the electronic and industrial musical duo, “Mecánica Popular” with Eugenio Muñoz. In 1978, he formed “Finis Africae” with Javier Bergia and Juan Alberto Arteche, who joined in the mid-80s. He also formed the folk group “Babia” with Arteche and Luis Paniagua.

Delgado's works includes El sueño de Al-Zaqqaq (The Dream of Al-Zaqqaq) (1998), which sets to music a collection of poems by Ibn al-Zaqqaq, "El Hechizo de Babilonia", "Alquibla", "As-Sirr", etc.
