= Hafsa bint al-Hajj al-Rukuniyya =

Al-Andalus poet and teacher

- حفصة بنت الحاج الركونية
- Born: c. 1135; Granada, Al-Andalus
- Died: 1190 or 1191; Marrakesh
- Occupations: Poet, Teacher
- Writing career
- Language: Arabic
- Period: 12th century
- Genre: Poetry

Ḥafṣa bint al-Ḥājj ar-Rakūniyya (حفصة بنت الحاج الركونية, born c. 1135, died AH 586/1190–91 CE) was an aristocrat and poet of 12th century Granada, recognized as the last major female poet from al-Andalus and one of the most celebrated female poets of Andalusi literature. She is also remembered as a teacher in the Almohad court; Ibn al-Khatib later described her as ustādhat waqtihā (أستاذة وقتها 'the professor of her time').

== Biography ==
Sources do not tell us when she was born, but her birth must have been in or after AH 530/1135. She was the daughter of a Berber man, al-Hajj ar-Rukuni, a Granadan, who does not seem to have left traces among biographers. This family was noble and rich. We can therefore consider the father of Hafsa a notable figure in the city. Around the time that the Almohads came to power in 1154, Ḥafṣa seems to have begun a relationship with the poet Abū Jaʿfar Aḥmad ibn ʿAbd al-Malik Ibn Saʿīd; to judge from the surviving poetry, Ḥafṣa initiated the affair. With this, Ḥafṣa enters the historical record more clearly; the relationship seems to have continued until Abū Jaʿfar's execution in 1163 by Abū Saʿīd ʿUthmān, son of Abd al-Mu'min and governor of Granada: Abū Jaʿfar had sided with his extended family, the Banu Saʿid, against Adb al-Muʿmin.

Ḥafṣa later became known as a teacher, working for Caliph Abu Yusuf Yaqub al-Mansur to educate his daughters in Marrakesh. She died there in 1190 or 1191. She is perhaps one of the most celebrated Andalusian female poets of medieval Arabic literature.

== Poetry ==
Around 60 lines of Ḥafṣa's poetry survive, among nineteen compositions, making Ḥafṣa the best attested of the medieval female Moorish poets (ahead of Wallada bint al-Mustakfi and Nazhun al-Garnatiya bint al-Qulai’iya). Her verse encompasses love poetry, elegy, panegyric, satirical, and even obscene verse, giving her work unusual range. Perhaps her most famous exchange is a response to Abū Jaʿfar, here as translated by A. J. Arberry:

Abu Jaafar the poet was in love with Hafsa, and sent her the following poem:

God ever guard the memory
Of that fair night, from censure free,
Which hid two lovers, you and me,
Deep in Mu’ammal’s poplar-grove;
And, as the happy hours we spent,
There gently wafted a sweet scent
From flowering Nejd, all redolent
With the rare fragrance of the clove.

High in the trees a turtle-dove
Sang rapturously of our love,
And boughs of basil swayed above
A gently murmuring rivulet;
The meadow quivered with delight
Beholding such a joyous sight,
The interclasp of bodies white,
And breasts that touched, and lips that met.

Hafsa replied in this manner:

Do not suppose it pleased the dell
That we should there together dwell
In happy union; truth to tell,
It showed us naught but petty spite.
The river did not clap, I fear,
For pleasure that we were so near,
The dove raised not his song of cheer
Save for his personal delight.

Think not such noble thoughts as you
Are worthy of; for if you do
You’ll very quickly find, and rue,
High thinking is not always wise.
I scarce suppose that yonder sky
Displayed its wealth of stars on high
For any reason, but to spy
On our romance with jealous eyes.

== Sources ==
- Al-Mallah, Majd (6 April 2020). "Voice and Power: Ḥafṣah bint al-Ḥājj and the Poetics of Women in Al-Andalus". Journal of Arabic Literature. 51 (1–2): 1–26. doi:10.1163/1570064x-12341397.
- Moorish Poetry: A Translation of ’The Pennants’, an Anthology Compiled in 1243 by the Andalusian Ibn Saʿid, trans. by A. J. Arberry (Cambridge: Cambridge University Press, 1953), pp. 94–95.
- Arie Schippers, 'The Role of Women in Medieval Andalusian Arabic Story-Telling', in Verse and the Fair Sex: Studies in Arabic Poetry and in the Representation of Women in Arabic Literature. A Collection of Papers Presented at the Fifteenth Congress of the Union Européenne des Arabisants et des Islamisants (Utrecht/Driebergen, September 13-19, 1990), ed. by Frederick de Jong (Utrecht: Publications of the M. Th. Houstma Stichting, 1993), pp. 139-51 http://dare.uva.nl/document/184872.
- Marlé Hammon, 'Hafsa Bint al-Hajj al Rukuniyya', in Medieval Islamic Civilisation: An Encyclopedia, ed. by Josef W. Meri, 2 vols (New York: Routledge, 2006), I 308.
- Marla Segol, 'Representing the Body in Poems by Medieval Muslim Women', Medieval Feminist Forum, 45 (2009), 147-69: https://doi.org/10.17077/1536-8742.1773.
