= Ibn Bassam =

Arab Andalusian historian and poet (1058–1147)

- أَبُو اَلْحَسَنِ عَلِيُّ بْنُ بَسَّامٍ اَلشَّنْتَرِينِيُّ
- Born: Abū al-Ḥasan ʿAlī ibn Bassām al-Shantarīnī; 1058 CE; Santarém, Al-Andalus (modern-day Portugal)
- Died: 1147 CE
- Occupations: Poet, Historian

Academic background
- Influences: Ibn Hayyan, Abu Mansur al-Tha'alibi

Academic work
- Era: Almoravid era
- Notable works: Dhakhīra fī mahāsin ahl al-Jazīra

Ibn Bassām or Ibn Bassām al-Shantarīnī (Arabic: ابن بسام الشنتريني; 1058-1147) was an Arab-Andalusian poet and historian from al-Andalus. He was born in Santarém (sometimes spelled Shantarin or Xantarin) and hailed from the Banu Taghlib tribe. He died in 1147.

Ibn Bassam describes how the incessant invasions of the Christians forced him to run away from Santarém in Portugal, "the last of the cities of the west," after seeing his lands ravaged and his wealth destroyed, a ruined man with no possessions save his battered sword.

Especially well known is his anthology Dhakhīra fī mahāsin ahl al-Jazīra (The Treasury concerning the Merits of the People of Iberia), an important source relating to the Almoravid dynasty. In an article about the poet Abū Bakr 'Ubāda ibn Mā' as-Samā' in this work, Ibn Bassam describes the invention of the muwaššaḥ, ascribing the invention to the 10th century blind poet Muhammad Mahmud al-Qabri or Ibn ‘Abd Rabbih.

== Editions and translations ==
- ʼAbī ʼal-Ḥasan ʻAlī ibn Bassām ʼal-Shantarīnī, ʼal-Dhakhīrah fī maḥāsin ahl ʼal-Jazīrah, ed. by Iḥsān ʻAbbās, 4 vols in 8 (Bayrūt: Dār ʼal-Thaqāfah, 1978–81), https://al-maktaba.org/book/1035, https://archive.org/details/zakhera_mahasen_jazeera
- 'Ibn Bassām, from Al-dhakhīra fī maḥāsin ahl al-Jazīra translation', trans. by Ross Brann, in Medieval Iberia, ed. by Remie Constable, 2nd edn (Philadelphia: University of Pennsylvania Press, 2011), pp. 125–27.
