= Mursi =

Mursi may refer to:

== People ==
Mursi is an Arabic nisba meaning "from Murcia". It may refer to:

=== Surname ===
- Abdullah Morsi (1994–2019), son of former President Mohamed Morsi
- Abu al-Abbas al-Mursi (1219–1287), Sufi saint
- Ahmed Morsi (1930–2026), Egyptian artist
- Ali Ali El Morsi, Egyptian chief scout, former vice-president of the Egyptian Federation for Scouts and Girl Guides
- Basem Morsy (born 1992), Egyptian footballer
- Haydy Morsy (born 1999), Egyptian modern pentathlete
- Khalil Morsi (1946–2014), Egyptian actor
- Maya Morsy, Egyptian political and scientist
- Midhat Mursi (1953–2008), Egyptian chemist
- Mohamed Morsi (1951–2019), Egyptian politician, 5th President of Egypt
- Mohamed El-Morsy (born 1986), Egyptian footballer
- Pamela Morsi (born 1951), American writer
- Saleh Morsi (1929–1996), Egyptian screenwriter and novelist
- Sally Mursi (born 1968), Egyptian entertainer
- Sam Morsy (born 1991), English-born Egyptian footballer
- Tareq Ali Mursi, Egyptian terrorist, alleged member of Egyptian Islamic Jihad

=== Given name ===
- Morsi El Sayed Hegazy (born 1948), Egyptian academic and economist

=== Middle name ===
- Hania Morsi Fadl, Sudanese radiologist, CEO of the Khartoum Breast Cancer Center

== Other uses ==
- Mursi people, a Nilotic pastoralist ethnic group in Ethiopia (also known as the Mun people)
- Mursi language
- Mursi, a village in Xarrë municipality, Albania

== See also ==
- Abu al-Abbas al-Mursi Mosque, a mosque in Alexandria, Egypt
