= Ibn Sa'ada =

12th-century Andalusian scholar and judge

Abū ʿAbd Allāh Muḥammad ibn Yūsuf ibn Saʿāda al-Mursī (1103–1170) was an Andalusī Muslim judge and scholar with Ṣūfī tendencies.

Ibn Saʿāda was a native of Murcia, as indicated by his nisba al-Mursī. He was born between 8 June and 7 July 1103. He was a relative of Abū ʿAlī al-Ṣadafī, who bequeathed to him his collection of ḥadīth (Islamic tradition) along with his other papers. He studied under al-Ṣadafī, Abū Muḥammad ibn ʿAttāb, Abu ʾl-Walīd ibn Rushd, al-Ghazālī and Abū Bakr ibn al-ʿArabī. In 1126, he travelled to the Near East and in 1127 he undertook the Ḥajj to Mecca. He continued his studies in Mecca, Alexandria and Mahdia, only returning to Murcia in 1132. Besides the ḥadīth, he studied the Qurʾān, the philology of Arabic and kalām (apologetics).

Ibn Saʿāda became a popular teacher and preacher in southeastern al-Andalus. He was respected for his just rulings across all classes of society. He taught fiqh and served as a qāḍī (Islamic judge) at Murcia and later at Játiva (Shāṭiba). He also taught ḥadīth and preached the khuṭba (Friday sermon) in Murcia, Játiva and Valencia. He transmitted al-Tirmidhī's collection of ḥadīth known as Jāmiʿ al-ṣaḥīḥ to al-Andalus. He died in Játiva in 1170.

Two books are attributed to Ibn Saʿāda, including the Ṣūfī treatise Shajara al-Wahm al-Mutaraqqiyya ilā Durwa al-Fahm (Tree of the Imagination by Which One Ascends to the Path of Intellection), written at Murcia.

== Bibliography ==
- "Ibn Saada". Fundación Ibn Tufayl de Estudios Árabes. 24 August 2017.
- Mcgaha, Michael (1997). "The Sefer Ha-Bahir and Andalusian Sufism". Medieval Encounters. 3 (1): 20–57. doi:10.1163/157006797x00026.
- Robson, J. (1971). "Ibn Saʿāda". In Lewis, B.; Ménage, V. L.; Pellat, Ch. & Schacht, J. (eds.). The Encyclopaedia of Islam, Second Edition. Volume III: H–Iram. Leiden: E. J. Brill. p. 921. OCLC 495469525.
