= Ibn Sa'id al-Maghribi =

Arab geographer, historian and poet (1213–1286)

- Native name: ابن سعيد المغربي
- Born: 1213 Alcalá la Real, Granada, Al-Andalus
- Died: 1286 (aged 72–73) Tunis
- Occupation: Geographer, Historian, Poet
- Notable works: Al-Mughrib fī ḥulā al-Maghrib (The Extraordinary Book on the Adornments of the West)

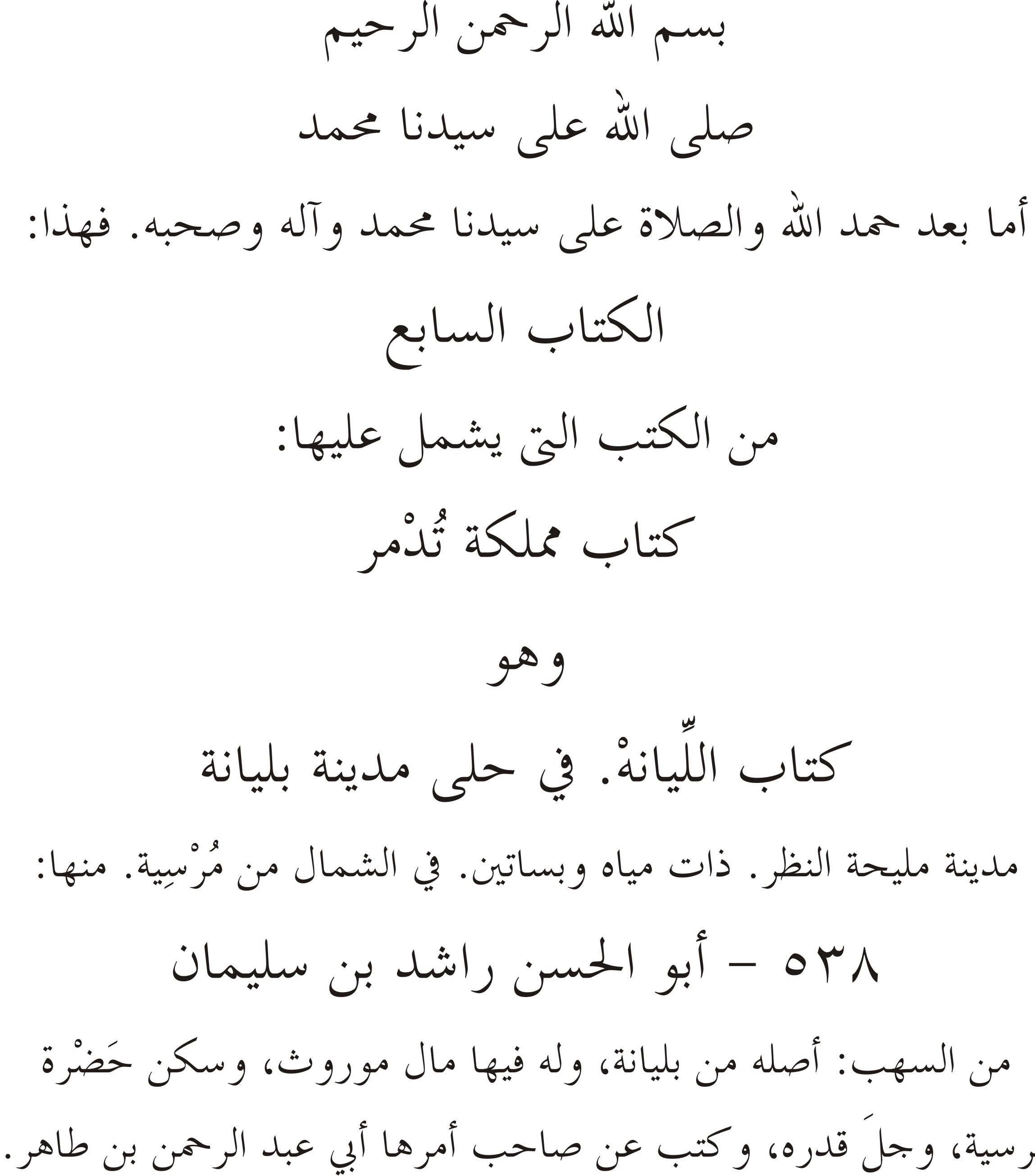
Excerpt from the chapter about Villena in Al-Mugrib fī ḥulā al-Magrib, in which the poet Abū l-Hasan Rāshid ibn Sulaymān is mentioned.

Abū al-Ḥasan ʿAlī ibn Mūsā ibn Saʿīd al-Maghribī (Arabic: علي بن موسى المغربي بن سعيد) (1213–1286), also known as Ibn Saʿīd al-Andalusī, was an Arab geographer, historian, poet, and the most important collector of poetry from al-Andalus in the 12th and 13th centuries.

== Biography ==
Ibn Said was born at Qal'a Benī Sa'īd (modern day Alcalá la Real) near Granada to a prominent family which was descended from the Companion of the Prophet Ammar ibn Yasir. Many of his family members were literary figures, and grew up in Marrakesh. He subsequently studied in Seville and stayed in Tunis, Alexandria, Cairo, Jerusalem and Aleppo. At the age of 30, he undertook a pilgrimage to Mecca. He was also a close friend of the Muwallad poet Ibn Muqana al-Ushbuni. His last years were spent in Tunis, and he died there in 1286.

== Writings ==
Ibn Said al-Maghribi wrote or compiled 'at least forty works on various branches of knowledge'.

Ibn Said's best known achievement was the completion of the fifteen-volume al-Mughrib fī ḥulā l-Maghrib ('The Extraordinary Book on the Adornments of the West'), which had been started over a century before by Abū Muḥammad al-Ḥijārī (1106–55) at the behest of Ibn Said's great-grandfather ‘Abd al-Malik. Abū Muḥammad al-Ḥijārī completed 6 volumes, ‘Abd al-Malik added to them; two of ‘Abd al-Malik's sons (Ibn Said's grandfather and great uncle) added more; Ibn Said's father worked on it further; and Ibn Said completed it. The work is also known as the Kitāb al-Mughrib ('book of the Maghrib'), and is midway between an anthology of poetry and a geography, collecting information on the poets of Maghreb organized by geographical origin.

Part of the Mughrib circulated separately as Rāyāt al-mubarrizīn wa-ghāyāt al-mumayyazīn (Banners of the Champions and the Standards of the Distinguished), which Ibn Said compiled in Cairo, completing it on 21 June 1243 (641 by Islamic dating). It is, in the words of Louis Crompton, 'perhaps the most important' of the various medieval Andalucian poetry anthologies. 'His aim in compiling the collection seems to have been to show that poetry produced in the West was as good as anything the East had to offer (and that stuff by Ibn Sa'id and his family was especially good)'.

Ibn Said's works that are probably preserved only fragmentarily, in quotation by others, include Al-Ṭāli‘ al-Sa‘ı̄d fı̄ Tārı̄kh Banı̄ Sa‘ı̄d, a history of the Banū Sa‘ı̄d.

An example of Ibn Said's own poems, which he included in the Rāyāt al-mubarrizīn wa-ghāyāt al-mumayyazīn, is "Black horse with a white chest", with a recent translation being Cola Franzen's translation into English of Gómez's 1930 Spanish translation:

=== Other works ===
- المقتطف من أزاهر الطرف
