= Abū ʿAbd Allāh Muḥammad ibn Saʿd ibn Mardanīsh =

Ruler of the Taifa of Murcia (r. 1147–1172)

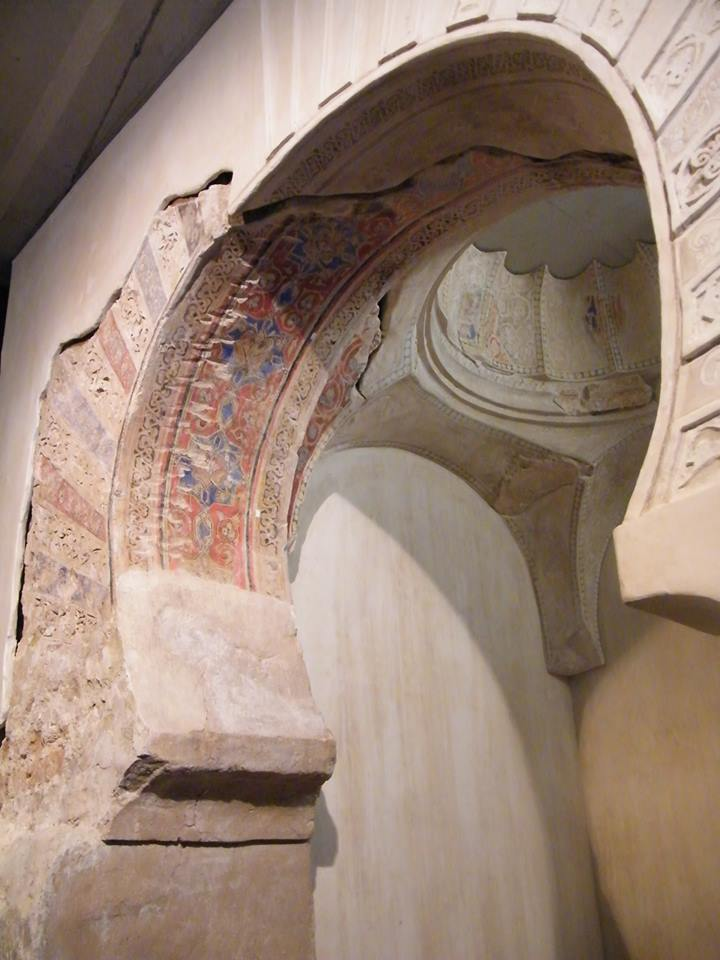
The miḥrāb of a Mardanīshī mosque, later the oratorio of the Alcázar Mayor of Murcia and now the Museo de la Iglesia de San Juan de Dios

The territorial control of the "Wolf King" ibn Mardanīsh

Abū ʿAbd Allāh Muḥammad ibn Saʿd ibn Muḥammad ibn Aḥmad ibn Mardanīsh, called al-Judhāmī or al-Tujībī (born AD 1124 or 1125 [AH 518], died AD 1172 [AH 568]) was the king of Murcia from AD 1147 (AH 542) until his death. He established his rule over the cities of Murcia, Valencia and Dénia as the power of the Almoravid emirate declined, and he opposed the spread of the Almohad caliphate. Christian sources refer to him as the "Wolf King" (Latin rex Lupus, Spanish rey Lobo or rey Lope).

Ibn Mardanīsh's full name was Abu ʿAbd Allāh Muḥammad ibn Saʿd ibn Muḥammad ibn Aḥmad ibn Mardanīsh al-Juḍāmī (or at-Tuȳībī), indicate he was the son of Saʿd, son of Muḥammad, son of Aḥmad, son of Mardanīsh. His tribal nisbas are no secure indication of Arab ancestry. He was a muwallad, a descendant of a native Iberian convert to Islam, and the name Mardanīsh is not of Arabic origin. The thirteenth-century Islamic scholar Ibn Khallikān derived it from an Ibero-Romance term for dung (via Latin merda), perhaps because of Ibn Mardanīsh's friendly relations with the Christians. It is more likely a corruption of Merdanix (today Merdancho), the name of a tributary of the river Najerilla, which was on the border between Christian and Islamic Spain in the early tenth century. This hydronym in turn derives from the Latin for dung, indicating dirty waters. This is consistent with Ibn Mardanīsh's family emigrating from the aṭ-Ṭaḡr al-Aʿlā (Upper March) around the Rioja, as told in Arabic sources.

In the first year of his rule (1147/8), Ibn Mardanīsh faced the rebellion of his relative, Yūsuf ibn Hilāl, based in the castle of Montornés. Yūsuf conquered the castles of al-Ṣujayra and al-Ṣajra, and defeated Ibn Mardanīsh before the walls of Moratalla, which he occupied. With a reduced following he attacked the fortress of Peñas de San Pedro and was captured. Ibn Mardanīsh threatened to gouge out his eyes unless he ordered the surrender of Moratalla. He refused and his right eye was removed. Ibn Mardanīsh then ordered Yūsuf's wife to surrender the castle or else see her husband blinded. She refused and Yūsuf's other eye was removed. Ibn Mardanīsh then sent his prisoner to Xàtiva, where he died shortly thereafter in 1148 or 1149.

In June 1149, after the republic of Genoa had established colonies at both Almería and Tortosa, Ibn Mardanīsh signed a ten-year truce with the republic, agreed to pay 15,000 Almoravid dinars (murābiṭūn) in tribute, exempted the Genoese from tariffs and permitted the establishment of Genoese funduqs at Valencia and Dénia. A payment of 5,000 murābiṭūn was due immediately: 3,000 in cash and 2,000 in equivalent silks. The remaining 10,000 was owed over two years. This treaty is preserved in the Genoese Liber iurium. According to the contemporary historian Caffaro, a similar treaty was signed in 1161. In January 1150, Ibn Mardanīsh signed a treaty with the republic of Pisa, promising funduqs and a general safe-conduct for Pisan merchants, but requiring no payment of tribute.

During Dhū l-Qaʿdah 560 (September–October 1165), Ibn Mardanīsh led a large army from Murcia to defend Lorca from an Almohad force advancing from the castle of Vélez. His troops were flanked by the Almohad force at a place called al-Fundūn in the valley of the Guadalentín. In the ensuing battle of Faḥṣ al-Jullāb they were routed.

== Sources ==
- Bosch-Vilá, J. (1971). "Ibn Mardanīsh". In Lewis, B.; Ménage, V. L.; Pellat, Ch. & Schacht, J. (eds.). The Encyclopaedia of Islam, Second Edition. Volume III: H–Iram. Leiden: E. J. Brill. pp. 864–865. OCLC 495469525.
- Constable, O. R. (1990). "Genoa and Spain in the Twelfth and Thirteenth Centuries: Notarial Evidence for a Shift in Patterns of Trade". Journal of European Economic History. 19 (3): 635–56.
- Kennedy, Hugh (1996). Muslim Spain and Portugal: A Political History of al-Andalus. Routledge.
- González Cavero, Ignacio (2007). "Una revisión de la figura de Ibn Mardanish: su alianza con el reino de Castilla y la oposición frente a los almohades". Miscelánea Medieval Murciana. 31: 95–110.
- Vallvé Bermejo, Joaquín (1972). "La división territorial en la España musulmana (II): la cora de "Tudmīr" (Murcia)". Al-Andalus. 37 (1): 145–193.
- Viguera, María J. (1996). "Sobre el nombre de Ibn Mardanis". Al-Qantara. 17 (1): 231–38.
