= Ibn Sahib al-Salat =

Arab Andalusī historian

Abū Marwān ʿAbd al-Malik ibn Muḥammad ibn Aḥmad ibn Muḥammad ibn Ibrāhīm ibn Ṣāḥib al-Ṣalāt al-Bājī (fl. c. 1130–1198) was an Arab Andalusī historian under the Almohads.

Little is known of the life of Ibn Ṣāḥib al-Ṣalāt. His nisba indicates that his family came from Beja. He himself may have been born there or perhaps in Seville, where he spent his formative years and most of his life. He was studying theology in Marrakesh in 1165. His writings show that he was an eyewitness to many important events, including the Almohad conquest of Carmona in 1161, the fasts ordered in Marrakesh to celebrate the Caliph Abū Yaʿqūb Yūsuf's recovery from illness in 1170 and the battle of Huete in 1172. He was a ḥāfiẓ. He was still living in 1198.

Ibn Ṣāḥib al-Ṣalāt's main work is al-Mann bi ʾl-imāma ʿala ʾmustaḍʿafīn bi-an jaʿalahum Allāh al-aʿimma wa-jaʿalahum al-wārithīn ('Gift of the Imamate to the Formerly Humiliated, Whom God Has Made Imams and Heirs'). Only the second volume of this work survives, covering the years 1159–1172 (AH 554–568). It is known from a single copy in the manuscript Marsh 433 in the Bodleian Library. It is especially important for its information on the inner workings of the Almohad administration. It has been edited and there is a Spanish translation. Ibn Ṣāḥib al-Ṣalāt is also sometimes cited as an authority by other authors, such as Ibn al-Qaṭṭān.

Ibn Ṣāḥib al-Ṣalāt also wrote Thawrat al-murīdīn ('Revolution of the Disciples'), a history of the second period of taifas (factional kingdoms) that followed the collapse of the Almoravids. It is lost, but is partially known from citations by other authors, such as Ibn al-Khaṭīb.

== Bibliography ==
- Jones, Linda G. (2013). "The Preaching of the Almohads: Loyalty and Resistance across the Strait of Gibraltar". In Yuen-Gen Liang; Abigail Balbale; Andrew Devereux; Camilo Gómez-Rivas (eds.). Spanning the Strait: Studies in Unity in the Western Mediterranean. Brill. pp. 71–101. ISBN 978-90-04-25664-4.
- Balbale, Abigail Krasner (2023). The Wolf King: Ibn Mardanish and the Construction of Power in al-Andalus. Cornell University Press. doi:10.1515/9781501765896.
- García Novo, Marta (2018). "Ibn Ṣāḥib al-Ṣalāt al-Bāŷī". Diccionario biográfico español. Real Academia de la Historia.
- Hopkins, J. F. P. (1958). Medieval Muslim Government in Barbary until the Sixth Century of the Hijra. Luzac.
- Hopkins, J. F. P. (1971). "Ibn Ṣāḥib al-Ṣalāt". In Lewis, B.; Ménage, V. L.; Pellat, Ch. & Schacht, J. (eds.). The Encyclopaedia of Islam, Second Edition. Volume III: H–Iram. Leiden: E. J. Brill. pp. 924–925. OCLC 495469525.
- Huici Miranda, Ambrosio, ed. (1969). Al-Mann bil-Imāma: Estudio preliminar, traducción e índices (PDF). Anubar.
