= Al-Fath ibn Khaqan (al-Andalus) =

12th century Anthologist of Andalus

Al-Fatḥ ibn Khāqān al-Ishbīlī al-Andalusī
- Died: 11 November 1134; Marrakesh, Morocco
- Cause of death: assassination
- Other names: Al-Fatḥ ibn Muḥammad ibn ‘Ubayd Allāh ibn Khāqān, Abū Naṣr al-Qaysī al-Ishbīlī

Academic work
- Era: Almoravid era
- Main interests: anthologist of poetry and history
- Notable works: Maṭmaḥ al-anfus wa-masraḥ al-taʼannus fī mulaḥ ahl al-Andalus; Qalā'id al-'Iqyān

Abū Naṣr al-Fatḥ ibn Muḥammad ibn ʿUbayd Allāh ibn Khāqān ibn Abdallah al-Qaysī al-Ishbīlī (أبو نصر الفتح بن محمد بن عبيد الله بن خاقان بن عبد الله القيسي الإشبيلي; died 11 November 1134), known as al-Fatḥ ibn Khāqān, was a 12th-century popular anthologist of al-Andalus.

== Life ==
Ibn Khāqān was born in either Alcalá la Real or Seville. He received an elite education and travelled widely across al-Andalus. Described as a 'libertine' and yet he was appointed secretary to the Almoravid governor of Granada Abū Yūsuf Tāshfīn ibn ‘Alī; a post he abandoned almost immediately to travel to Marrakesh where sometime later he was murdered, it was rumoured, on the orders of the sultan. He died on 11 November 1134.

The main sources for his biography are:

- Ibn Khallikan – Wafayāt al-A’yān wa-Anbā’ Abnā’ al-Zamān (tr. Obituaries of Eminent Men}
- Ḥāfiẓ Ibn Diyha al-Kalbī – Al-Mutrib fī Ash’ār Ahl il-Mughrib
- Al-Ṣafadī – Al-Wāfī bi-'l-wafayāt

== Works ==
- Qalā'id al-'Iqyān (قلائد العقيان) ‘Collars of Gold’ or 'Necklace of Rubies'; akhbar (traditions) of poets of the Maghreb and al-Andalus, who were his contemporaries with examples of their poems.
- Maṭmaḥ al-anfus wa-masraḥ al-taʼannus fī mulaḥ ahl al-Andalus (مطمح الأنفس ومسرح التأنس في ملح أهل الأندلس) (Kābir, Wāsiṭ, Saghīr – Large, Medium, Small) 'The Aspiration of the Souls and the Theater of Congeniality in the Anecdotes of the People of al-Andalus'; History of the ministers, scribes and poets of al-Andalus.

These two works are written in rhymed prose full of metaphorical expressions and are an excellent source of information about the apogee of Andalusian letters.
