= Al-Tha'alibi =

Medieval Arab writer and anthologist

- أبو منصور الثعالبي، عبد الملك بن محمد بن إسماعيل
- Born: Abū Manṣūr ʿAbd al-Malik ibn Muḥammad ibn Ismāʿīl al-Thaʿālibī; 961 AD; Nishapur, Iran
- Died: 1038 AD
- Occupation: Writer
- Writing career
- Language: Arabic
- Period: Medieval
- Genres: Anthologies, epigrams
- Notable works: Yatīmat al-dahr, Tatimmat at Yatīma

Abū Manṣūr ʿAbd al-Malik ibn Muḥammad ibn Ismāʿīl al-Thaʿālibī (أبو منصور الثعالبي، عبد الملك بن محمد بن إسماعيل) (961–1038), was an Arab writer famous for his anthologies and collections of epigrams. As a writer of prose and verse in his own right, distinction between his and the work of others is sometimes lacking, as was the practice of writers of the time.

== Life ==
Al-Thaʿālibī was born in Nishapur and was based there throughout his life. Of Arab ethnicity, his nickname means 'furrier' or 'tailor who works with fox fur', and medieval biographers speculated that this was his job or his father's, but there is no convincing evidence for either proposition. The only hint as to al-Thaʿālibī's education is a claim that he was taught by Abū Bakr al-Khwārizmi (who was certainly a source for al-Thaʿālibī's poetry anthologies). Likewise, despite his great prowess, there are only hints that al-Thaʿālibī was himself a teacher. Al-Thaʿālibī travelled widely beyond Nishapur, however: autobiographical information scattered in his works shows that he spent time in Bukhārā, Jurjān, Isfarāʾīn, Jurjāniyya, Ghazna, and Herat. The numerous dedicatees of his works indicate the circles in which al-Thaʿālibī moved and the range of his acquaintances; they included Abū al-Fāḍl ʿUbaydallāh ibn Aḥmad al-Mīkālī (d. 1044/1055), Qābus ibn Wushmgīr (d. 1012), Sebüktegin (d. 1021), Abū Sahl al-Ḥamdūnī (d. after c. 1040), and both Masʿūd of Ghazna (d. 1040) and other members of his court such as Abū Naṣr Aḥmad ibn Muḥammad ibn Abī Zayd, Abū al-Ḥasan Musāfir ibn al-Ḥasan, and Abū al-Fatḥ al-ḥasan ibn Ībrāhīm al-Ṣaymarī.

Al-Thaʿālibī gained fame as a composer of both Arabic prose and verse, writing in most verse genres of his culture, and developing literary and philological scholarship. His most famed, however, for his two anthologies of roughly contemporary Arabic verse, much of which would otherwise have been lost: the Yatīmat al-dahr and its sequel the Tatimmat at Yatīma.

== Works ==
Al-Thaʿālibī has twenty-nine known works.

=== Kitāb Yatīmat al-dahr fī mahāsin ahl al-ʿaṣr ===
This is al-Thaʿālibī's best known work and contains valuable extracts from the poetry of his own and earlier times; its title means 'The Matchless Pearl of the Age on the Fine Qualities of Contemporary Men'. In its surviving form — a second edition revised by al-Thaʿālibī — it quotes 470 poets in four volumes, organised geographically. The four volumes cover, in this order, Syria and the west (Mawṣil, Egypt, Maghrib); Iraq; Western Iran (al-Jabal, Fārs, Jurjān, and Ṭabaristān); and Eastern Iran (Khurāsān and Transoxania). Composition began in 384/994. No satisfactory edition exists. The Yatīmat and its sequel the Tatimmat have been characterised as 'our main, if not the sole, source about literary activity' in al-Tha'ālibī's time.

- ʿAbd al-Malik ibn Muḥammad Thaʿālibī, Yatīmat al-dahr fī shuʿarāʼ ahl al-ʿaṣr (يتيمة الدهر في شعراء أهل العصر), 4 vols (Damascus: [al-Maṭbaʿah al-Ḥifnīyah] دمشق : المطبعة الحفنية, 1302 AH [1885 CE]), vol. 1, vol. 2, vol. 3, vol. 4. The most widely used edition, with a Persian interlinear translation.
- Muḥammad Muḥyī al-Dīn ‘Abd al-Ḥamīd محمد محي الدين عبدالحميد (ed.), يتيمة الدهر في في محاسن أهل العصر, 4 vols (Cairo 1956), vol. 1, vol. 2, vol. 3, vol. 4. Bilāl Urfahʹlī concludes that this is the most accurate edition, and 'offers a preliminary basis of studying the Yātima, even if some points will have to be changed according to what a critical edition might reveal'.
- ʻAbd al-Malik ibn Muḥammad Thaʻālibī, Yatīmat al-dahr fī maḥāsin ahl al-ʻaṣr maʻ al-tatimma wa-l-fahāris (يتيمة الدهر في شعراء أهل العصر مع التتمة والفهارس), ed. by Mufīd Muḥammad Qumayḥah, 6 vols (Bayrūt: Dār al-Kutub al-ʻIlmīyah (دار الكتب العلمية), 1983), vols 1-4 (index vol. 6). This includes the original work, as well as its sequel (Tatimma): Machine-readable text.
- Manuscript facsimile from the Thomas Fisher Arabic Collection.

=== Tatimmat al-Yatīmah ('completion of the Yatīma') ===
The Tatimmat al-Yatīmah was a sequel to the Yatīmat al-dahr. It follows the same geographical structure as its precursor (with an extra, fifth, book collecting miscellaneous poets whom Thaʿālibī had missed) and added poems and poets which al-Thaʿālibī had not been able to include in the Yatīmat. Like the Yatīma, it survives in a second edition revised by al-Thaʿālibī, published in or after 424/1032.

- The best edition is Ahmad Shawqi Radwan, 'Thaʿālibī's “Tatimmat al-Yatīmah”: A Critical Edition and a Study of the Author as Anthologist and Literary Critic' (unpublished PhD thesis, University of Manchester, 1972).
- The most widely available edition, prior to the digitisation of Radwan's edition, was ʻAbd al-Malik ibn Muḥammad Thaʻālibī, Tatimmat Yatīmat al-dahr, fi maḥāsin ahl al-ʻaṣr (تتمة يتيمة الدهر في محاسن أهل العصر), in Yatīmat al-dahr fī maḥāsin ahl al-ʻaṣr maʻ al-tatimma wa-l-fahāris (يتيمة الدهر في شعراء أهل العصر مع التتمة والفهارس), ed. by Mufīd Muḥammad Qumayḥah, 6 vols (Bayrūt: Dār al-Kutub al-ʻIlmīyah (دار الكتب العلمية), 1983), vol. 5 (index vol. 6). Machine-readable text.
- An earlier edition is Tatimmat ʾal-yatīmah, ed. by ʻAbbas ʾIqbal, 2 vols (Tihran, 1353 AH [1934]) [based on Paris, Bibliothèque Nationale, Fonds Arabe, 3308].

=== Other works ===
- Aḥsan mā samiʿtu ('the best I ever heard'), an anthology of poetry and prose, including 535 poems averaging 2.26 lines each, apparently abridged from a collection called Aḥāsin al-maḥāsin (the best of the best).
  - Al-Thaʿālibī, Aḥsan mā samiʿtu, ed. by Muḥammad Ṣādiq ʿAnbar (Cairo: al-Maktabah al-Maḥmūdiyyah, n.d. [1925]).
- Kitāb Fiqh ul-Lugha; lexicographical dictionary arranged by semantic subject. (Paris, 1861), (Cairo, 1867), (Beirut, 1885 - incomplete).
- Zād safar al-mulūk
  - Zād safar al-mulūk: A Handbook on Travel by Abū Manṣūr al-Thaʿālibī (d. 429/1038), ed. by Ramzi Baalbaki and Bilal Orfali, Bibliotheca Islamica, 52 (Beirut: Orient-Institut, 2011), ISBN 978-3-87997-692-8.
- Al-Iqtibās min al-Qurʾān (Arabic: الاقتباس من القرآن الكريم, 'quoting from the generous Qurʾān', literally 'taking hot coals from the generous Qurʾān'), on the cultural and literary influence of the Qurʾān.
  - Ed. by I. M. al-Ṣaffār (Baghdad: Dār al-Ḥurriyya li-l-Ṭibāʿa, 1975).
  - Ed. by I. M. al-Ṣaffār and M. M. Bahjat, 2 vols (al-Manṣūra: Dār al-Wafāʾ, 1992) [repr. Cairo: Dār al-Wafāʾ, 1998).
  - Ed. by I. M. al-Ṣaffār (ʿAmmān: Jidārā li-l-Kitāb al-ʿAlamī, 2008).
- Makārim al-akhlāq wa-maḥāsin al-ādāb wa-badāʾiʿ al-awṣāf wa-gharāʾib al-tashbīhāt
  - The Book of Noble Character: Critical Edition of Makārim al-akhlāq wa-maḥāsin al-ādāb wa-badāʾiʿ al-awṣāf wa-gharāʾib al-tashbīhāt Attributed to Abū Manṣūr al-Thaʿālibī (d. 429/1039), ed. by Bilal Orfali and Ramzi Baalbaki, Islamic History and Civilisation: Studies and Texts, 120 (Leiden: Brill, 2015), ISBN 978-90-04-30093-4.
- Kitāb Lata'if al-ma'arif (tr. 'Book of curious and entertaining information' Clifford Edmund Bosworth, Edinburgh University Press, 1968).
- Kitāb al-Kināya wa-l-taʿrīd aw al-Nihāya fī fann al-kināya (ed. F. al-Ḥawwār, Baghdad & Köln: Manshūrāt al-Jamal, 2006).
- Ghurar akhbār mulūk al-Furs wa-siyarihim, an Arabic chronicle of pre-Islamic Iranian dynasties, dedicated to al-Nasr(brother of Mahmud of Ghazni).
- Ādāb al-mulūk or Sirāj al-mulūk, a mirror for princes.

== External links and further reading ==
- Orfali, Bilal (2009). "The Works of Abū Manṣūr al-Tha'ālibī (350-429/961-1039)". Journal of Arabic Literature. 40 (3). Leiden: Brill Publishers: 273–318. doi:10.1163/008523709X12554960674539. JSTOR 20720591.
- Urfahʹlī, Bilāl, The Anthologist's Art: Abu Mansur al-Tha'alibi and his Yatimat al-dahr, Brill Studies in Middle Eastern Literatures, 37 (Leiden: Brill, 2016), ISBN 9789004316294.
