= Ibn Khafaja =

Andalusian Muslim poet (1058–1138/9)

- ابن خفاجة
- Born: Abu Ishaq ibn Ibrahim ibn Abu al-Fath; 1058; Alzira, Al-Andalus (now Spain)
- Died: 1138/1139
- Occupation: Poet
- Writing career
- Language: Arabic

Abu Ishaq ibn Ibrahim ibn Abu al-Fath (1058–1138/9), called Ibn Khafajah (إبن خفاجة), a native of Alzira, was a poet of al-Andalus during the reign of the Almoravids. He was born in 1058 in Alzira (Arabic: جزيرة شقر) near Valencia where he spent most of his life. He was the maternal uncle of poet Ibn al-Zaqqaq.

He wrote sophisticated nature poetry. He remained unmarried but had many friends and lived to be over eighty. There is a style based on him, afterwards followed by many, known as 'khafājī'.

His poetry often uses images to a dramatic function, such as contrasting light and darkness, or humanising the night environment.

Composer Mohammed Fairouz set three poems of Ibn Khafajah to music in a cycle of vocal chamber music written for the Cygnus Ensemble.

== Bibliography ==
- Arthur Wormhoudt (ed.), The Diwan of Abu Ishaq Ibn Ibrahim Ibn Abu Al-Fath Ibn Khafaja, Oskaloosa, Ia.: William Penn College, 1987, ISBN 978-0-916358-39-6
- Arie Schippers "Ibn Khafaja (1058-1139) in Morocco. Analysis of a laudatory poem addressed to a member of the Almoravid clan," in: Otto Zwartjes e.a. (ed.) Poetry, Politics and Polemics: Cultural Transfer Between the Iberian Peninsula and North Africa, Amsterdam: Rodopi, 1996, ISBN 90-420-0105-4 (pp. 13–34)
- Magda M. Al-Nowaihi, The Poetry of Ibn Khafajah A Literary Analysis, (Rev. version of the author's thesis, Harvard, 1987), Leiden: Brill, 1993 ISBN 978-90-04-09660-8
- Burgel, J. C., "Man, Nature and Cosmos as Intertwining Elements in the Poetry of Ibn Khafāja," in: Journal of Arabic literature; vol. 14, 1983 (p. 31)
- Hamdane Hadjadji and André Miquel, Ibn Khafaja l’Andalou, L’amant de la nature, Paris: El-Ouns, 2002
- Abd al-Rahman Janair, Ibn Khafaja l-Andalusi, Beirut: Dar al-Afaq, 1980
