= Ibn al-Zaqqaq =

12th-century Andalusian poet

- علي إبن عطيّة إبن الزقّاق البلنسي اللخمي
- Born: Ali ibn Attiya ibn al-Zaqqaq c. 1100; Valencia, Al-Andalus (now Spain)
- Died: 1133 or 1134
- Occupation: Poet
- Writing career
- Language: Arabic

Ali ibn Attiya ibn al-Zaqqaq (Arabic: علي إبن عطيّة إبن الزقّاق البلنسي اللخمي) (c. 1100 Valencia - 1133 or 1134) was one of the great poets of Al-Andalus during the reign of the Almoravids. He was a Muslim from Banu Lakhm. His mother was the sister of fellow Andalusian poet, Ibn Khafaja, and there is scholarly dispute regarding his father. He was a disciple under philosopher Ibn Ṣîd de Badajoz.

El sueño de Al-Zaqqâq by Luis Delgado is a collection of the works of Ibn Al-Zaqqaq set to music.

== Reception ==
Literary historian Emilio García Gómez referred to al-Zaqqaq's descriptive poetry as "the dramatization of metaphor".
