= Pedro Alonso Pablos =

Spanish film producer and animator

Pedro Alonso Pablos (Madrid, January 11, 1979) is a film producer, known for his internet talk show, a pioneer in that medium, and for making his animated feature films almost entirely by himself.

== Interviews ==
Mentioned interviews were recorded in Madrid in 2004/2005 and produced, directed and presented by Pedro. Many Spanish and international celebrities were interviewed, including Santiago Segura, Álex de la Iglesia, Guillermo del Toro, Oliver Stone (with a small appearance), José Luis Moreno and Keanu Reeves, among others. These videos represent an early example of web television, and the first one was recorded in July 2004, approximately 7 months before the appearance of YouTube. These videos were distributed through his own website, FreakSpain.

== Animation ==
Afterwards, Pedro has released through the Spanish VOD portal Filmin his first animated mini series, Cuentos del mundo, made entirely by him with the help of voice actress Mª Luz Crespo Chaves.

In 2016, Pedro released through Filmin his first animated feature film, La ruta de los elefantes, which is one of the first feature films made almost entirely by just one person. This film technique was named solo filmmaking.

In January 2019, he released his second feature film, Triskipolis, through Amazon Prime Video for the United States, using the same technique as the previous one, with a fast and great impact and downloads worldwide.

By 2021, Pedro had produced two more films with the aforementioned prior technique: My surprising and fabulous imaginary friend (2020), and The lake of oblivion (2021). By 2023, he had made two more animated feature films in the style of the above, Kaptavita (2022) and El hombre que nunca lloró (2023). In 2024, he released two more animated feature films, Era un soñador and Abenzaidún y Wallada, amor eterno (the first feature film dedicated to the famous love story starring the poets of the ancient Caliphate of Córdoba Ibn Zaydun and Princess Wallada). In 2025, he also released two other works, Usa la imaginación, and El Megatoro. In 2026, he released another animated feature, Daga bailaora.
