= Zaydūn =

Zaydūn may refer to:

- the town Zaydūn (Iran), modern site of Ancient(?) Persian Rew-Ardashir, which is now the only Chaldean Catholic Metropolitan titular see
- Ibn Zaydún
