= Kharja =

Final refrain of a muwashshah

A kharja or kharjah (Arabic: خرجة, romanized: kharjah, lit. 'exit' [ˈxardʒa]; Spanish: jarcha [ˈxaɾtʃa]; Portuguese: carja [ˈkaɾʒɐ]; also known as a markaz مَرْكَز 'center'), is the final couple of abyāt, or verses, of a muwaššaḥ (مُوَشَّح 'girdle'), a poem or song of the strophic lyric genre from al-Andalus. The kharja can be in a language that is different from the body; a muwaššaḥ in literary Arabic might have a kharja in vernacular Andalusi Arabic or in a mix of Arabic and Andalusi Romance, while a muwaššaḥ in Hebrew might contain a kharja in Arabic, Romance, Hebrew, or a mix.

The muwashshah typically consists of five strophes of four to six lines, alternating with five or six refrains (qufl); each refrain has the same rhyme and metre, whereas each stanza has only the same metre. The kharja appears often to have been composed independently of the muwashshah in which it is found.

== Characteristics of the kharja ==
About a third of extant kharjas are written in Classical Arabic. Most of the remainder are in Andalusi Arabic, but there are about seventy examples that are written either in Iberian Romance languages or with significant Romance elements.

Generally, though not always, the kharja is presented as a quotation from a speaker who is introduced in the preceding stanza.

It is not uncommon to find the same kharja attached to several different muwashshahat. The Egyptian writer Ibn Sanā' al-Mulk (1155–1211), in his Dar al-Tirāz (a study of the muwashshahat, including an anthology) states that the kharja was the most important part of the poem, that the poets generated the muwashshah from the kharja, and that consequently it was considered better to borrow a good kharja than compose a bad one.

Kharjas may describe love, praise, the pleasures of drinking, but also ascetism.

== Corpora ==
=== Corpus of Arabic muwaššaḥāt ===
Of the approximately 600 known secular Arabic muwaššaḥāt, there are almost 300 kharjas in vernacular Andalusi Arabic and over 200 in Standard Arabic (فُصْحَى), though some of the vernacular kharjas are essentially Standard Arabic with a vulgar gloss. About 50 are in Andalusi Romance or contain some Romance words or elements.

=== Corpus of Hebrew muwaššaḥāt ===
About half of the corpus of the more than 250 known muwaššaḥāt in Hebrew have kharjas in Arabic. There about roughly 50 with kharjas in Hebrew, and about 25 with Romance. There are also a few kharjas with a combination of Hebrew and Arabic.

=== Others ===
In their experimentation of the muwaššaḥ genre, the Mashriqi writers Ibn Sanā' al-Mulk and as-Safadi made kharjas in different languages using Persian and Turkish.

== Romance kharjas ==
Though they comprise only a fraction of the corpus of extant kharjas, it is the Romance kharjas that have attracted the greatest scholarly interest. With examples dating back to the 11th century, this genre of poetry is believed to be among the oldest in any Romance language, and certainly the earliest recorded form of lyric poetry in Andalusi Romance or another Iberian Romance language.

Their rediscovery in the 20th century by Hebrew scholar Samuel Miklos Stern and Arabist Emilio García Gómez is generally thought to have cast new light on the evolution of Romance languages.

The Romance kharjas are thematically comparatively restricted, being almost entirely about love. Approximately three-quarters of them are put into the mouths of women, while the proportion for Arabic kharjas is nearer one-fifth.

=== Debate over origins ===
Since the kharja may be written separately from the muwashshah, many scholars have speculated that the Romance kharjas were originally popular Spanish lyrics that the court poets incorporated into their poems. Some similarities have been claimed with other early Romance lyrics in theme, metre, and idiom. Arabic writers from the Middle East or North Africa like Ahmad al-Tifashi (1184–1253) referred to "songs in the Christian style" sung in al-Andalus from ancient times that some have identified as the kharjas.

Other scholars dispute such claims, arguing that the kharjas stand firmly within the Arabic tradition with little or no Romance input at all, and the apparent similarities only arise because the kharjas discuss themes that are universal in human literature anyway.

=== Debate over language and reading ===
Modern translations of the Romance kharjas are a matter of debate particularly because the Arabic script does not include vowels. Most of them were copied by scribes who probably did not understand the language they were recording, which may have caused transmission errors. A large spectrum of translations is possible given the ambiguity created by the missing vowels and potentially erroneous consonants. Because of this, most translations of these texts will be disputed by some. Severe criticism has been made of García Gómez's editions because of his palaeographical errors. Further debate arises around the mixed vocabulary used by the authors.

Most of the Romance kharjas are not written entirely in Romance, but include Arabic elements to a greater or lesser extent. It has been argued that such blending cannot possibly represent the natural speech patterns of the Romance speakers, and that the Romance kharjas must therefore be regarded as macaronic literature.

A minority of scholars, such as Richard Hitchcock contend that the Romance Kharjas are, in fact, not predominantly in a Romance language at all, but rather an extremely colloquial Arabic idiom bearing marked influence from the local Romance varieties. Such scholars accuse the academic majority of misreading the ambiguous script in untenable or questionable ways and ignoring contemporary Arab accounts of how Muwashshahat and Kharjas were composed.

== Examples ==
=== Romance ===
An example of a Romance kharja (and translation) by the Jewish poet Judah Halevi:

Vayse meu corachón de mib: ya Rab, si me tornarád? Tan mal meu doler li-l-habib! Enfermo yed, cuánd sanarád?	My heart has left me, Oh sir, will it return to me? (Alternate translation: Oh Lord, will you transform me?) So great is my pain for my beloved! I am sick, when will I be cured?,

These verses express the theme of the pain of longing for the absent lover (habib). Many scholars have compared such themes to the Galician-Portuguese cantigas de amigo which date from c. 1220 to c. 1300, but “[t]he early trend […] towards seeing a genetic link between kharajat and cantigas d'amigo seems now to have been over-hasty.”

=== Arabic ===
An example of an Arabic kharja:

How beautiful is the army with its orderly ranks
When the champions call out, ‘Oh, Wāthiq, oh, handsome one!’

The kharja is from a muwashshah in the Dar al-Tirāz of Ibn Sanā' al-Mulk.

== History of kharja scholarship ==
=== Manuscript sources ===
Ibn Sanāʾ al-Mulk, a 12th century Egyptian poet, wrote an anthology and study of the muwaššaḥ and its kharja entitled Dār aṭ-ṭirāz fī ʿamal al-muwaššaḥāt (دار الطراز في عمل الموشحات). The Syrian scholar Jawdat Rikabi published an edition of the work in 1949.

Ibn al-Khatib, a 14th century Andalusi poet, compiled an anthology of muwaššaḥāt entitled Jaysh at-Tawshīḥ (جيش التوشيح). Alan Jones published a modern edition of this work.

An anthology of muwaššaḥāt entitled Uddat al-Jalīs (عدة الجليس), attributed to a certain Ali ibn Bishri al-Ighranati, is based on a manuscript taken from Morocco in 1948 by Georges Séraphin Colin (1893-1977). Alan Jones published an Arabic edition in 1992.

Ibn Bassam wrote in Dhakhīra fī mahāsin ahl al-Jazīra (الذخيرة في محاسن أهل الجزيرة) that the kharja was the initial text around which the rest of the muwaššaḥ was composed.

Ibn Khaldun also mentions the muwaššaḥ and its kharja in his Muqaddimah.

=== Modern study ===
In 1948, the Hungarian linguist Samuel Miklos Stern published "Les Vers finaux en espagnol dans les muwaššaḥs hispano-hebraïques" in the journal al-Andalus, translated into English in 1974 as The Final Lines of Hebrew Muwashshaḥs from Spain. Stern's interpretation of kharjas in Hebrew texts made them accessible to Romanists and had a great impact on the Spanish establishment and scholars of Romance in the West.

Emilio García Gómez and Josep M. Solà-Solé compiled collections of kharjas. Gómez's 1965 book Jarchas Romances De La Serie Arabe En Su Marco presented a corpus of all known kharjas at the time; although it did not include annotation or scholarly apparatus, it became canonical. Solà-Solé's Corpus de poesía mozárabe (Las Harjas andalusíes) offered a complete scholarly apparatus, variations taken from different manuscripts, thorough discussion, and thoughtful speculation.

LP Harvey, Alan Jones, and James T. Monroe have also made influential contributions to the study of the kharjas.

== See also ==
- Aljamiado, the practice of writing a Romance language with the Arabic script.
- Arabic poetry
- Spanish poetry

== Editions of the Kharjas and Bibliography ==
- Corriente, Federico, Poesía dialectal árabe y romance en Alandalús, Madrid, Gredos, 1997 (contains all extant kharjas in Romance and Arabic)
- Stern, Samuel Miklos, Les Chansons mozarabes, Palermo, Manfredi, 1953.
- García Gómez, Emilio, Las jarchas romances de la serie árabe en su marco : edición en caracteres latinos, versión española en calco rítmico y estudio de 43 moaxajas andaluzas, Madrid, Sociedad de Estudios y Publicaciones, 1965, ISBN 84-206-2652-X
- Solà-Solé, Josep Maria, Corpus de poesía mozárabe, Barcelona, Hispam, 1973.
- Monroe, James & David Swiatlo, ‘Ninety-Three Arabic Harğas in Hebrew Muwaššaḥs: Their Hispano-Romance Prosody and Thematic Features’, Journal of the American Oriental Society, 97, 1977, pp. 141–163.
- Galmés de Fuentes, Álvaro, Las Jarchas Mozárabes, forma y Significado, Barcelona, Crítica, 1994, ISBN 84-7423-667-3
- Nimer, Miguel, Influências Orientais na Língua Portuguesa, São Paulo, 2005, ISBN 85-314-0707-9
- Armistead S.G., Kharjas and villancicos, in «Journal of Arabic Literature», Volume 34, Numbers 1-2, 2003, pp. 3–19(17)
- Hitchcock, Richard, The "Kharjas" as early Romance Lyrics: a Review, in «The Modern Language Review», Vol. 75, No. 3 (Jul., 1980), pp. 481–491
- Zwartjes, Otto & Heijkoop, Henk, Muwaššaḥ, zajal, kharja : bibliography of eleven centuries of strophic poetry and music from al-Andalus and their influence on East and West, 2004, ISBN 90-04-13822-6
