= Jadaka al-Ghaithu =

Literature work by Ibn al-Khatib

"Jādaka al-Ghaithu" (Arabic: جَادَكَ الغَيْثُ "Good Rain Would Befit You"; incipit: جادَكَ الغيْثُ إذا الغيْثُ هَمى يا زَمانَ الوصْلِ بالأندَلُسِ) is an Andalusi Arabic muwashshah by Ibn al-Khatib.

It was written as a madīh (مديح "panegyric") of Sultan Muhammad V of Granada. Abd al-Halim Husayn Harrut estimates it was written in the Hijri year 769 (1367-1368) or shortly thereafter, due to the presence of the phrase al-ghanī billah (الغني بالله), a moniker used for Muhammad V after a number of victories over the Crown of Castile, the last of which occurred around 1367–1368.

It is notable piece in Andalusi literature in general and the repertoire of the muwashshah genre in particular.

According to the Maghrebi scholar Ahmad al-Maqqari (1577–1632) in Nafh at-Tib, "Jādaka al-Ghaithu" takes from Ibn Sahl of Seville's poem with the maṭlaʿ, or opening:

هَل دَرى ظَبيُ الحِمى أَن قَد حَمى .. قَلبَ صَبٍّ حَلَّهُ عَن مَكنَسِ
فَهوَ في حَرٍّ وَخَفقٍ مِثلَما .. لَعِبَت ريحُ الصَبا بِالقَبَسِ

== Music ==
It has been performed by musicians such as Fairuz, Sami Yusuf and Mohammad Bashir.

In the West, it was interpreted in 2010 by Qiyans Krets & Oscar Fredriks Kammarkör of the Oscar Fredrik Church in Sweden and recorded as "Dja Da Kall" on Echoes of Qiyan: A Nordic Excursion Into the World of Al-Andalusian, Medieval and Sephardic Music.
