= Ibn Sanāʾ al-Mulk =

12th-century Egyptian judge and poet

Abu ’l-Qāsim Hibat Allāh b. Abī ’l-Faḍl Jaʿfar b. al-Muʿtamid (Arabic: أبو القاسم هبة الله بن أبي الفضل جعفر بن المعتمد), known as Ibn Sanāʾ al-Mulk (ابن سناء الملك), was a 12th-century Egyptian qāḍi, poet, scholar interested in the Andalusi muwaššaḥ. He published Dār aṭ-ṭirāz fī ʿamal al-muwas̲h̲s̲h̲aḥāt (دار الطراز في عمل الموشحات), an anthology containing 34 Andalusi and Maghribi muwaššaḥat, his theory of the genre, as well as 35 of his own muwaššaḥat. He was also the first person in the Mashriq to compose muwaššaḥat, writing some kharjas with Persian words.

== Dar at-Tiraz ==
Ibn Sanāʾ al-Mulk's book on the muwaššaḥ, Dār aṭ-ṭirāz fī ʿamal al-muwas̲h̲s̲h̲aḥāt (دار الطراز في عمل الموشحات), is regarded as the most complete contemporary description of the genre. It notably described the muwaššaḥ as a poetic form and a musical form, making it an important text for the history of Andalusi classical music.

Dar at-Tiraz was published in a modern edition by the Syrian scholar Jawdat Rikabi in 1949.
