= Ibn Baqi =

Moorish writer

- أبو بكر يحيى بن محمد بن عبد الرحمن بن بقي
- Born: Abu Bakr Yahya Ibn Muhammad Ibn Abd al-Rahman Ibn Baqi; Córdoba or Toledo, Al-Andalus (now Spain)
- Died: 1145 or 1150
- Occupation: Poet
- Writing career
- Language: Arabic
- Notable work: Muwashshahat

Ibn Baqi (Arabic: إبن بقي) or Abu Bakr Yahya Ibn Muhammad Ibn Abd al-Rahman Ibn Baqi (Arabic: أبو بكر يحيى بن محمد بن عبد الرحمن بن بقي) (died 1145 or 1150) was an Arab poet from Córdoba or Toledo in al-Andalus. Baqi is one of the best-known strophic poets and songwriters of Al-Andalus. He moved between Morocco and Al-Andalus and wrote several poems honoring members of a Moroccan family, the Banu Asara, qadis of Salé. He is especially famous for his muwashshahat. A considerable number of his poems are in the anthology of Al-Maqqari.
