= Muwashshah =

Poetry and music genre

Muwashshah (Arabic: مُوَشَّح muwaššaḥ 'girdled'; plural مُوَشَّحَات muwaššaḥāt; also تَوْشِيْح tawšīḥ 'girdling,' pl. تَوَاشِيْح tawāšīḥ) is a strophic poetic form that developed in al-Andalus in the late 10th and early 11th centuries. The muwaššaḥ, embodying the Iberian rhyme revolution, was the major Andalusi innovation in Arabic poetry, and it was sung and performed musically. The muwaššaḥ features a complex rhyme and metrical scheme usually containing five aghṣān (أَغْصَان 'branches'; sing. غُصْن ghuṣn), with uniform rhyme within each strophe, interspersed with asmāṭ (أَسْمَاط 'threads for stringing pearls'; sing. سِمْط simṭ) with common rhyme throughout the song, as well as a terminal kharja (خَرْجَة 'exit'), the song's final simṭ, which could be in a different language. Sephardic poets also composed muwaššaḥāt in Hebrew, sometimes as contrafacta imitating the rhyme and metrical scheme of a particular poem in Hebrew or in Arabic. This poetic imitation, called muʿāraḍa (مُعَارَضَة 'contrafaction'), is a tradition in Arabic poetry.

The kharja, or the markaz (مَـْركَز 'center') of the muwaššaḥ, its final verses, can be in a language that is different from the body; a muwaššaḥ in literary Arabic might have a kharja in vernacular Andalusi Arabic or in a mix of Arabic and Andalusi Romance, while a muwaššaḥ in Hebrew might contain a kharja in Arabic, Romance, Hebrew, or a mix.

The muwaššaḥ musical tradition can take two forms: the waṣla of the Mashriq and the Andalusi nubah of the Maghrib.

== History ==
While the qasida and the maqama were adapted from the Mashriq, strophic poetry is the only form of Andalusi literature known to have its origins in the Iberian Peninsula. Andalusi strophic poetry exists in two forms: the muwaššaḥ: a more complex version in Standard Arabic with the exception of the concluding couplet, or the kharja, and zajal: a simpler form entirely in vernacular Arabic. The earliest known muwaššaḥs date back to the eleventh century.

It was exported to the east, and celebrated there by figures such as Ibn Sanāʾ al-Mulk and ibn Dihya al-Kalby. The corpus of muwaššaḥs is formed by pieces in Hebrew and Andalusi Arabic. Tova Rosen describes the muwaššaḥ as "a product and a microcosm of the cultural conditions particular to al-Andalus. The linguistic interplay between the standard written languages—Arabic and Hebrew—and the oral forms—Andalusi Arabic, Andalusi Romance, Hebrew, and other Romance languages—reflect the fluidity and diversity of the linguistic landscape of al-Andalus.

The earliest known source on the muwashshah is Ibn Bassam’s 'Dhakhīra fī mahāsin ahl al-Jazīra '. He ascribes the invention of the muwashshah to the 10th century blind poet Muhammad Mahmud al-Qabri or ibn ‘Abd Rabbih. Nonetheless, there are no extant muwashshah poems attributed to these authors.

Ibn Sanāʾ al-Mulk (d. 1211), author of Dār aṭ-ṭirāz fī ʿamal al-muwashshaḥāt (دار الطراز في عمل الموشحات), wrote the most detailed surviving musical description of the muwashshaḥ. He wrote that some of the muwashshaḥāt had lyrics that fit their melodies (sometimes through melisma), while others had improvised nonsense syllables to fill out the melodic line—a practice that survives to the present with relevant sections labeled as shughl (شُغل 'work') in songbooks.

== Poetic form ==
Examples of muwaššaḥ poetry start to appear as early as the 9th or 10th century. It is believed to come from the Arabic root w-š-ḥ (وشح) which means any thing that a woman might wear on her neck from a necklace to a scarf, and the verb Tawašḥ means to wear. Some relate it to the word for a type of double-banded ornamental belt, the wišaḥ, which also means a scarf in Arabic. The underlying idea is that, as there is a single rhyme running through the refrain of each stanza, the stanzas are like objects hung from a belt.

Typically, Arabic poetry has a single meter and rhyme across the poem and is structured according to couplets, not strophes. The muwashah however, is generally divided into five stanzas with a complex rhyme scheme. Each stanza consisted of aghsan (sing: ghusn), lines with a rhyme particular to that strophe and asmat (sing: simt), lines with a rhyme shared by the rest of the poem. Conventionally, the muwashshah opened with a maṭlaʿ (مَطْلَع‘the beginning’) and closed with a kharja (‘exit’). The kharja was in a vernacular language such as colloquial Arabic or Romance. It often was voiced by a different poetic speaker.

== Meter ==
The meter of the muwashah can be one of the classical meters defined by al-Khalil or the poet can devise a new meter. This subject is debated amongst scholars, some of whom argue for the use of a Romance metrical system based on syllable stress.

== Themes ==
Typical themes for a muwashshah include love, panegyric, and wine. Some muwashshah poems are devoted to a single theme while others combine multiple themes. One common thematic structure is love, followed by panegyric, and then love. The kharja also plays a role in elaborating the poem’s theme. At the end of a love poem, the kharja might be voiced by the beloved. The eastern muwashshah tradition includes themes such as elegy and invective. Ibn Arabi and ibn al-Ṣabbāgh composed esoteric muwashshahs that used wine and love as allegories for divine yearning.

== Corpora ==
=== Corpus of Arabic muwaššaḥāt ===
Of the approximately 600 known secular Arabic muwaššaḥāt, there are almost 300 kharjas in vernacular Andalusi Arabic and over 200 in Standard Arabic (فُصْحَى), though some of the vernacular kharjas are essentially Standard Arabic with a vulgar gloss. About 50 are in Andalusi Romance or contain some Romance words or elements.

=== Corpus of Hebrew muwaššaḥāt ===
About half of the corpus of the more than 250 known muwaššaḥāt in Hebrew have kharjas in Arabic. There about roughly 50 with kharjas in Hebrew, and about 25 with Romance. There are also a few kharjas with a combination of Hebrew and Arabic.

== Hebrew muwashshah ==
An important number of the muwashshah poems written in al-Andalus were composed in Hebrew. Like the muwaššaḥāt composed in Arabic, those in Hebrew might also contain linguistically distinct kharjas, either in Romance, Arabic, or a combination of Hebrew and Arabic. Because of its strophic structure, it was similar to some Hebrew liturgical poetry. Starting in the 11th century, the Hebrew muwashshah was also used for religious purposes. The first extant Hebrew muwashshahs are attributed to Samuel ibn Naghrillah. Other prominent Hebrew muwashshah authors include Judah Halevi, Todros ben Judah Halevi Abulafia and Joseph ibn Tzaddik.

The first author to compose a devotional muwashshah was Solomon ibn Gabirol, about two centuries prior to the development of religious muwashshah poetry in Arabic. He was followed in this tradition by Moses ibn Ezra, Abraham ibn Ezra, and Judah Halevi, among others. The poems were designed for use in prayer services and were elaborated themes of particular benedictions. Unlike other Hebrew muwashshahs, the kharja of a devotional muwashshah was in Hebrew.

== The musical genre ==
Musically, the ensemble consists of oud (lute), maghreb rebab (Andalusi rebab back then), qanun (box zither), darabukkah (goblet drum), and daf (tambourine): the players of these instruments often double as a choir. The soloist performs only a few chosen lines of the selected text. In Aleppo multiple maqam rows (scales) and up to three awzān (rhythms) are used and modulation to neighboring maqamat was possible during the B section. Until modernization it was typical to present a complete waslah, or up to eight successive muwaššaḥ including an instrumental introduction (sama'i or bashraf). It may end with a longa. Famous Muwashshah songs still played in the Arab World today include Lamma Bada Yatathanna and Jadaka al-Ghaithu.

== Famous poets ==
A composer of muwaššaḥāt is known as a waššāḥ (وَشّاح 'girdler'; pl. وَشّاحُون waššāḥūn). Famous waššāḥūn include:

- Al-Tutili
- Avempace
- Avenzoar
- Todros ben Judah Halevi Abulafia (Hebrew)
- Yehuda Halevi (Hebrew)
- Ibn al-Khatib
- Ibn Baqi
- Ibn Zamrak
- Ibn Sahl of Seville

== Famous muwashshahs ==
- "Lamma Bada Yatathanna" (لما بدا يتثنى)
- "Jadaka al-Ghaithu" (جادك الغيث)

== See also ==
- Aljamiado
- The kharja is the final stanza of a muwaššaḥ, of which a few are in the Mozarabic language and therefore the first attesting of an Iberian Romance language and first written examples of the Castilian language.
- Zajal
- Fasıl
- Malouf
- Samuel Miklos Stern
- Emilio García Gómez
- James T. Monroe
- Wallada bint al-Mustakfi
