= Lamma Bada Yatathanna =

Arabic poem

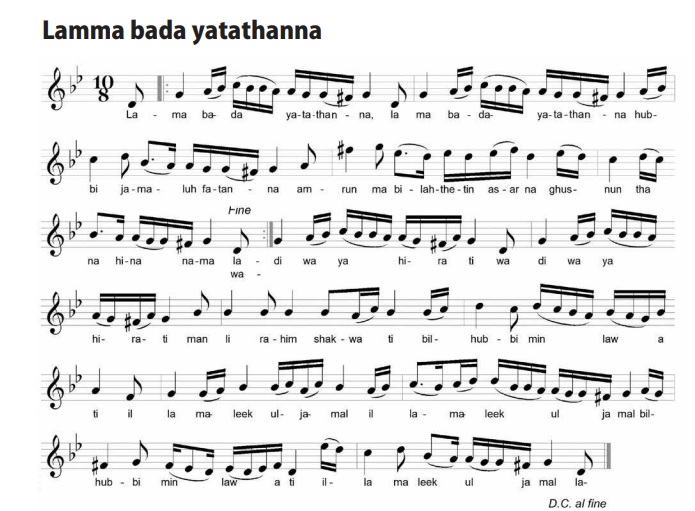
Musical notation of Lamma Bada Yatathanna

Lamma Bada Yatathanna, the same recording appears on "Les cafes chantants du Caire, Vol. 3" by Les Artistes Arabes Associés

Lamma Bada Yatathanna (Arabic: لما بدا يتثنى) is an muwashshah of the Nahawand maqam. The poem is considered one of the most famous Arabic pieces of its era, and it came from al-Andalus.

The author of the piece is disputed, but is thought to be ibn al-Khatib (1313–1374).

== Lyrics ==
Arabic lyrics	English translation
لما بدا يتثنى (أمان)	When my love appeared walking with a swinging gait (Aman)
حبي جماله فتنى (أمان)	His beauty infatuated me (Aman)
أمرٌ ما بلحظـة أسـرنا	Something captured our hearts at a glance.
غصن ثنى حين مال	A branch bended once tilted.
وعدي ويا حيرتــي	Oh my destiny, my dilemma
مالي رحيم شـكوتي	none will answer my appeal.
في الحب من لوعتـي	for healing me from my ardor of love.
إلا مليك الجمــال	except the Lord of beauty.

== Rhythm ==
The song is in 10/8 time.

== Melody ==
Its mode is the nahawand maqam (مقام نهاوند, harmonic minor scale).

== Renditions ==
The song is a standard of Arabic and Middle Eastern musical repertoires. Versions of the song have been recorded by artists including Fairuz, Sabah Fakhri, Souad Massi, Lena Chamamyan, Nabyla Maan, Hamza El Din, Sami Yusuf and Abeer Nehme.
