= Proseminar in Homophile Studies =

1970 American university course

The Proseminar in Homophile Studies, one of the first courses in the United States about homosexuality, was held in the fall semester of 1970. It was taught at the University of Nebraska–Lincoln by professor Louis Crompton and others. The class was interdisciplinary, and used elements of the social sciences and the humanities.

The course was controversial; criticism was leveled at it before the semester began. It drew intense political scrutiny but attempts in the state legislature to restrict it and similar classes failed. The course was offered for only one semester but Crompton, his associates, and other faculty later devised related classes about homosexuality—including one about lesbian novelists. Course instructor James Cole later won recognition for defending the course to the legislature; he said academic freedom remained in jeopardy 20 years later. The university commemorated the 50th anniversary of the course throughout 2021 and 2022.

== Background ==
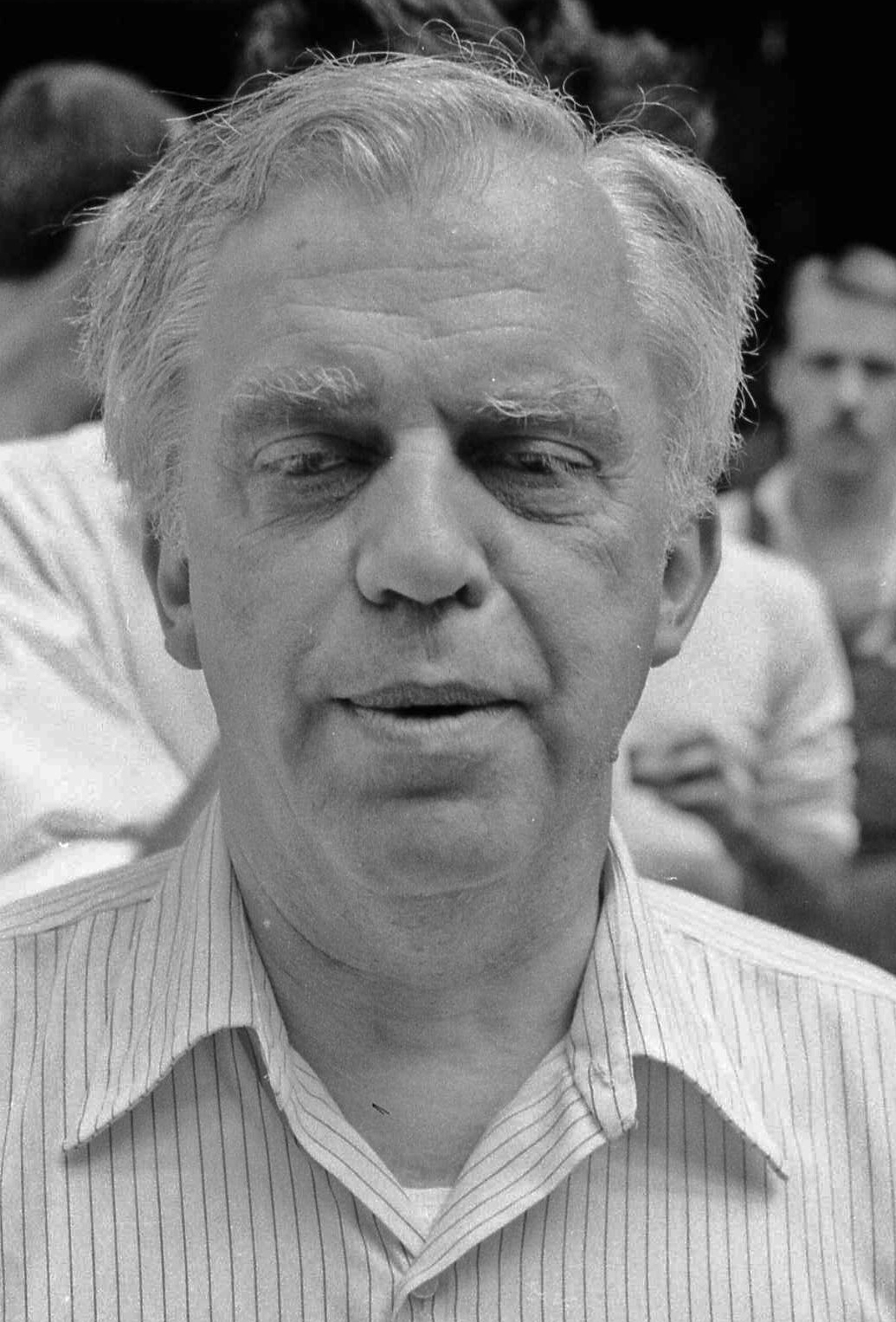
Crompton in 1983

In October 1969, the National Institute of Mental Health (NIMH) task force on homosexuality recommended increased educational attention to gay issues. The following month, Professor Louis Crompton proposed a course on the subject; the proposal, which was titled "Proseminar in Homophile Studies", was dispatched to the chairman of curricular affairs at the University of Nebraska–Lincoln. Crompton later stated this course was "in line" with the NIMH's recommendations. Crompton, who was a scholar on writer and critic George Bernard Shaw, was in 1970 a gay activist and a high-ranking member of two gay advocacy organizations. (Note: He was president of the Lincoln–Omaha Council on Religion and the Homosexual and chair of the religious committee for the North American Conference of Homophile Organizations.) Crompton was listed as an instructor alongside James Cole, the director of the training program for clinical psychology, and Louis Martin, a psychiatrist at the school health center who regularly saw homosexual patients. The new course was enrolled in the psychology, anthropology, sociology, and English departments.

The departments approved the course and in July 1970, the university's board of regents met to consider it. Several closed-session meetings, which the regents said pertained to "procedure involved in the homophile course", were held. According to Lincoln Star writer Milan Wall, the closed sessions were entertained at the request of Regent Dick Herman, who questioned Crompton's objectivity in the course since Crompton did not understand homosexuality to be unnatural. After these meetings, the regents asked the psychology department to take control of the class; (Note: Before, the class was under the control of no department.) after consideration, university administration transferred it and Cole became its coordinator.

== Course ==
The Proseminar in Homophile Studies was offered in the fall semester of 1970, and was taught by Crompton, Cole, and Martin.. Thirteen lecturers, including retired police officers and professors from other institutions, were invited to teach the course. Most of the 34 undergraduate and graduate students who enrolled were studying anthropology and sociology—and half of them were women. It was one of the first course in the United States about homosexuality.

Both Crompton and the university's dean of faculties Peter Magrath said the aim of the course was to understand homosexuality through interdisciplinary study. In the syllabus, Crompton wrote the class sought to "see the homosexual not simply as a textbook or clinical case" but rather as a political minority. The class engaged in several subject areas, including law, psychology, politics, sociology, and theology; Crompton had studied the theological facets of homosexuality in Berkeley, California, during mid-1970. The course also included a study of literature, such as novels and plays written by Black, White, and Chicano gay authors, among them James Baldwin, Mart Crowley, and John Rechy.

== Political reactions ==
Although the course was not well-known to the public, it was controversial among politicians for its treatment of homosexuality. Neither candidate for governor in that year's election defended it; incumbent Republican Norbert Tiemann said he opposed the class and Democratic challenger J. James Exon said it was unnecessary.

Senator Terry Carpenter of Scottsbluff strongly opposed the course. On October 28 and 29, Carpenter invited 35 witnesses, including regent candidates and Crompton, to attend a legislative hearing on "why the University feels it necessary to have a course about homosexuals", among other sexuality-related issues. The hearing was held a week before that year's election, and according to the university's student newspaper, the hearing was held for Carpenter's personal political gain. The goal, they said, was to embarrass the two regents due for re-election and to settle a grudge he had earlier acquired with the board. Among those in attendance was regent B.N. Greenberg, who had approved the course and was running for re-election. Greenberg said the course was not intended to promote homosexuality but was meant to bring about its eradication by training professionals to change the manifestation of same-sex attraction; four other regents supported this testimony. Magrath compared reactions to the course to those of World War I-era Nebraska, which had forbidden teaching languages other than English in public schools. In writing, six members of the NIMH task force made statements of support for the course.

On the final day of hearings, Carpenter indicated he would attempt to end the course and introduce legislation to both abolish faculty tenure without legislative approval and prohibit any teaching of homosexuality or any other "aberrant sexual behavior" in state colleges other than the medical school. In response to this latter bill, Cole testified the course was "perhaps the most serious underdiscussed problem in the United States", and that homosexuality was an interdisciplinary issue that was not only suitable for the medical school.

== Aftermath ==
The Proseminar in Homophile Studies was offered for one semester, after which it was replaced with broader studies of sexual behavior. By late 1971, Cole submitted a course proposal titled Human Sexuality and Society, which was expected to be offered the next year. Two courses related to the proseminar were later offered; one in 1975 about sex roles in literature and one in 1977 about lesbian novelists. (Note: The 1977 class was offered by Julia Penelope.) This latter class was largely uncontroversial, though some students criticized it for a perceived anti-male bias. Once the United States Department of Health, Education, and Welfare became aware of the proseminar, they suggested other universities base their homosexuality-related curricula on it.

Two years after the proseminar ended, Crompton offered the first gay studies seminar held at the Modern Languages Association. (Note: This seminar was entitled the "Research in Gay Literature".) Magrath, whose career in university administration had advanced considerably in Nebraska, left the state for Minnesota in 1974 after he was not considered to become the university's next chancellor. The Lincoln Star said this move may have been because of his support for the course. In 1989, Cole earned an academic freedom award for his defense of the course. The chairman of its nominating committee said Cole's testimony helped avoid one of the strongest threats to academic liberty at the university in several years. Cole said; "Today, the potential for orthodoxy and for academic blackmail ... are no less real than they were 20 years ago".

Carpenter's tenure bill was voted-down in committee and lost a procedural vote to bring it to the whole legislature. Its margin was 16 in favor and 25 against. The measure to ban homosexuality from being taught failed 15–27. Carpenter's other bills—one to abolish the university's student newspaper and one to modify regents' powers to appropriate funding—also failed, though a rewritten tenure bill passed; the regents were now allowed to institute it.

Throughout 2021 and 2022, the University of Nebraska–Lincoln planned to hold a series of events to commemorate the 50th anniversary of the Proseminar in Homophile Studies. These include public readings of original course materials, visits from cartoonist Alison Bechdel and novelist Garth Greenwell, an exhibit of archival materials, and a keynote address by Jack Halberstam, a queer theorist.
