= Todros ben Judah Halevi Abulafia =

Jewish poet of the 13th century

Todros ben Judah Halevi Abulafia (1247 – after 1300) was a Jewish poet who wrote primarily in Hebrew. He also wrote poems in Arabic.

Abulafia collected his poems in diwan, which he called Gan HaMeshalim veHaHidot (The Garden of Parables and Riddles). The collection of poems was written mostly in Hebrew and included poems by other authors as well. Also included were 35 poems that represented a poetic debate between Todros Abulafia and the poet Phinehas Halevi.

Angel Sáenz-Badillos, Professor in the Hebrew Department of Complutense University of Madrid, Spain, believes that Abulafia was "probably the best and most prolific author of Christian Spain during the reigns of Alfonso the Learned and his son Sancho IV of Castile."

== Life ==
A distant relative of Meir Abulafia, Todros Abulafia was born in 1247 in Toledo. He mastered Arabic, and was well educated in both Arabic and Christian poetry and literature.

Early in his career Abulafia became a courtier in the court of Alfonso X of Castile. The court of Alfonso, who was called Alfonso the Wise and Alfonso the Learned, attracted an ambitious poet because it was a cultural center of Castile at that time.

Besides being a poet, Abulafia was also a diplomat and a financier. In 1279 the king ordered him to collect an enormous amount of taxes from the Jewish community of Castile. The king needed the money to pay for his religious military campaign. The collected money never reached the army because one of the king's sons used it for his own purpose. The angry king ordered the execution of two leading tax collectors, one of whom was Abulafia's patron. Some time later Abulafia and most other Jews of Castile were taken from a synagogue and arrested. Ransom was set as the condition for their release. Abulafia continued to write poems while in prison. After he was released he became a courtier once again, this time in the court of Alfonso's son Sancho IV of Castile.

Little is known about Abulafia's life after 1298.

== Poetry ==
The poetry of Todros ben Judah Halevi Abulafia was influenced by his living in Christian Spain, where Arabic was still spoken 150 years after Christian rulers retook Iberia from the Moors.

In some ways, his poetry differs from the poetry written by his Jewish Andalusian predecessors, who were forced to flee Southern Spain during the Berber-Almohad invasion of 1147–1148; at the same time, common motifs like the use of hyperbole still can be seen. One example is a poem that Abulafia dedicated to Ibn Shoshan, a Jew who had just arrived in Toledo from Morocco. In the poem, titled "Flowers' debate", "the author's tapestried earth, encircled by a jeweled necklace of flowers, frames the rivalry of a group of prominent flowers: the red rose, vere the pale rose,shoshan, and the narcissus, havasele". In the poem each flower debates its characteristics, but none could overcome the pale rose,shoshan, which also stands for the honoree of the poem, Ibn Shoshan and his family. In the poem the pale rose, shoshan, won the debate of the flowers because it presented the best characteristics: "righteous, courageous, humble, philanthropic and praiseworthy."

His preference for Arab women finds confirmation in some of his poems.

Yea, one should love an Arab girl
Even if she's not beautiful or pure.
But stay far away from a Spanish girl
Even if she's radiant as the sun!

Todros led a life of adventures, and "prosperous sensuality" and this sexual realism with some degree of lustfulness gets reflected in many of his poems.

she is so ignorant, of intercourse she knows nothing.
But every Arab girl has charm and beauty
which capture the heart and alleviate frustration.
She looks as lovely as if dressed in golden embroidery,
nevertheless she is naked. And at the right moment she pleases;
She knows all about fornication and is adept at lechery.

Abulafia's poems continue the tradition of the troubadours who were always welcomed in the court of Alfonso the Wise, and this "troubadouresque fin’amor" is not found in Andalusian Hebrew tradition.

...Truly, it is enough for the man who loves her

to see her or to hear her words!
It is doctrine for every nobleman to make his life
a treadstone for her, and to lick the dust from her foot!
To suffer completely for her love,
for truly then God shall multiply her reward!
I shall set my heart to serve my love for her for ever
Never shall I ask for her to set me free!
As long as the sun rises in the East, or

As long as the birds sing of her!”

In discussing Abulafia's poetry, Peter Cole states: "Above all, Todros’s work is distinguished by its freshness and candor: he managed to introduce a vivid (though not always straight forward) personal dimension into his verse that went well beyond anything medieval Hebrew poetry had seen before him. He filled the classical conventions with irony, turned them on their heads, or did away with them altogether and created new poetic space in which to work."

== Translation challenges ==
Translation of Abulafia's poems, as well as other medieval poems written in Hebrew, presents some challenges because some words could be interpreted with several meanings. A good example of such challenge is the poem "Figs". Asking a friend for some figs, the poet writes: "[S]end a ripening fig, give a portion for seven of them, even for eight." The next line of the poem was translated as "And in return, here is my flatus." The Hebrew word used in the poem was zemorah that means "vine twig". Howard Tzvi Adelman from Queen's University says that "Zemorah means 'penis' and 'fig,' a reference to 'vagina.' I think that this is a sexual and not a scatological reference; both, however, fit the category of the grotesque. The next line—'Henceforth I won't give it to strangers'—could fit either way."

== Gan HaMeshalim veHaHidot ==
Little is known about the poet's life after 1298. After his death, his poetry was almost forgotten for more than six hundred years. Then the diwan was discovered and copied in 17th century Egypt. For the next few centuries, this copied manuscript traveled between Iraq and India, changing hands among antiquarian collectors from different countries. In the late 1800s, the manuscript became the property of Sha'ul 'Abdullah Yosef, an Iraqi scholar and businessman, who obtained the manuscript while working in Hong Kong. (It is unclear how the manuscript got to Hong Kong.) Yosef understood the manuscript's value because he was very knowledgeable in Hebrew. After his death in 1906, the manuscript became the possession of David Yellin, who was a leading scholar in medieval Hebrew poetry at that time. Yellin published the manuscript between 1934 and 1937 in three volumes, adding around twelve hundred poems to "the medieval Hebrew canon".
