= Louis Crompton =

Canadian scholar, professor and author (1925–2009)

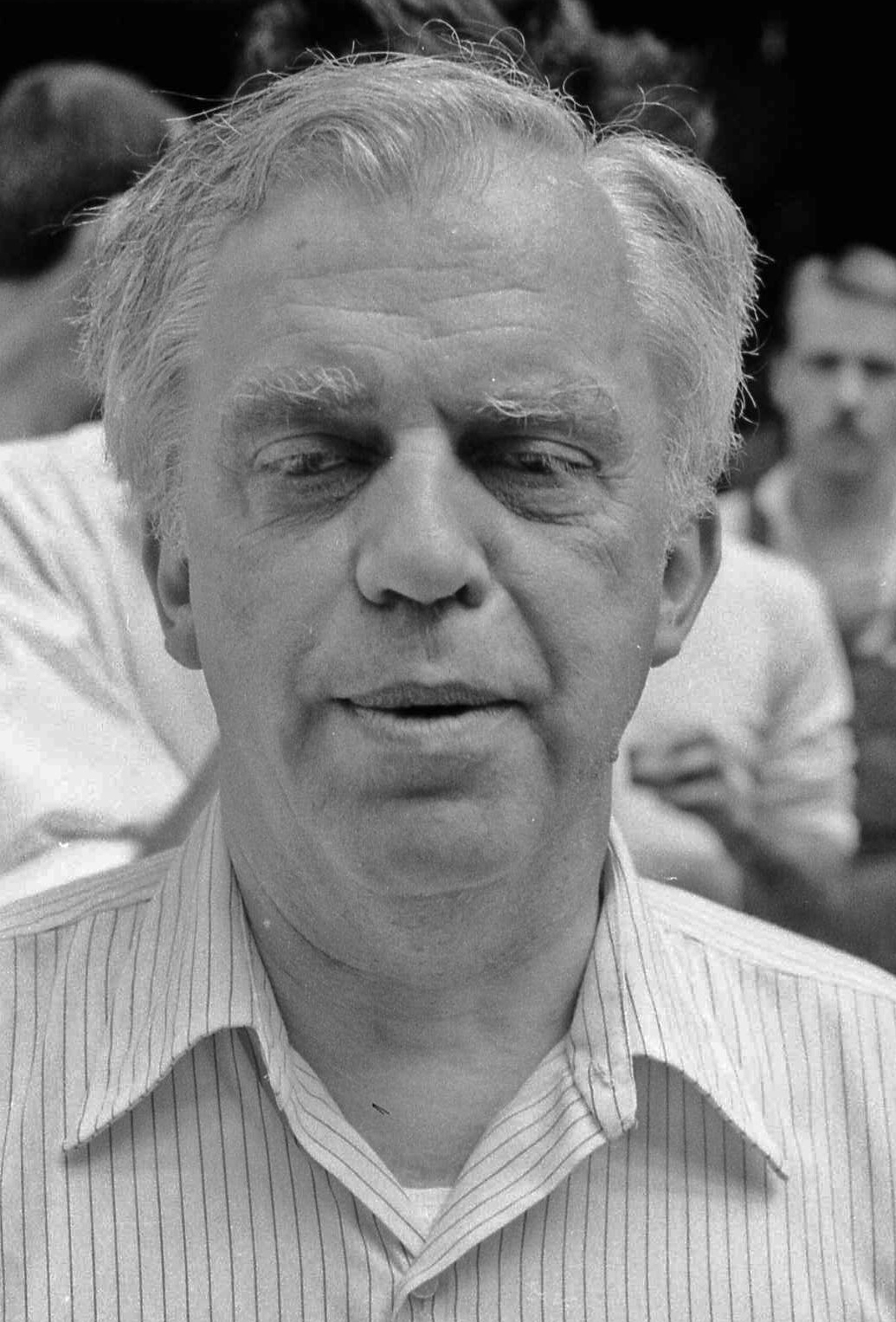
- Born: April 5, 1925; Port Colborne, Ontario, Canada
- Died: July 11, 2009 (aged 84); El Cerrito, California, U.S.

Academic background
- Education: University of Toronto

Louis Crompton (April 5, 1925 – July 11, 2009) was a Canadian scholar, professor, author, and pioneer in the instruction of queer studies.

== Biography ==
Born to Master Mariner Clarence and Mabel Crompton, Crompton received an M.A. in mathematics from the University of Toronto in 1948 and a Ph.D. in English from the University of Chicago in 1954. After teaching mathematics at the University of British Columbia and the University of Toronto, he joined the English department at the University of Nebraska in 1955, retiring in 1989. During his career, he gained an international reputation as a scholar of the works of George Bernard Shaw.

In 1970, Crompton taught a gay studies class at Nebraska, the Proseminar in Homophile Studies, the second such course offered in the United States, an action that raised LGBTQ awareness in academia, Nebraska, and the nation. The course provoked one Nebraska state legislator into introducing a bill that would ban any teaching on homosexuality in any Nebraska public college; the bill was not passed into law. Crompton nevertheless decided not to offer the course again, but continued to pursue the subject through research and publication.

In the early 1970s, Crompton became the faculty advisor for the Gay Action Group, forerunner of today's UNL Queer Ally Coalition, and also helped found the UNL Homophobia Awareness Committee, which became the Committee on Gay, Lesbian, Bisexual, and Transgender Concerns. In 1974, Crompton co-founded with Dolores Noll (1930–2019) of Kent State University and others the Gay and Lesbian Caucus of the Modern Language Association.

In 1978, Crompton scored a literary coup by editing and publishing in the Journal of Homosexuality the full text of "Offences Against One's Self: Paederasty," a never-before published 1785 essay by utilitarian philosopher Jeremy Bentham. Bentham had suppressed the essay during his lifetime, for fear of public outrage at his views on liberalizing the laws concerning homosexual activity.

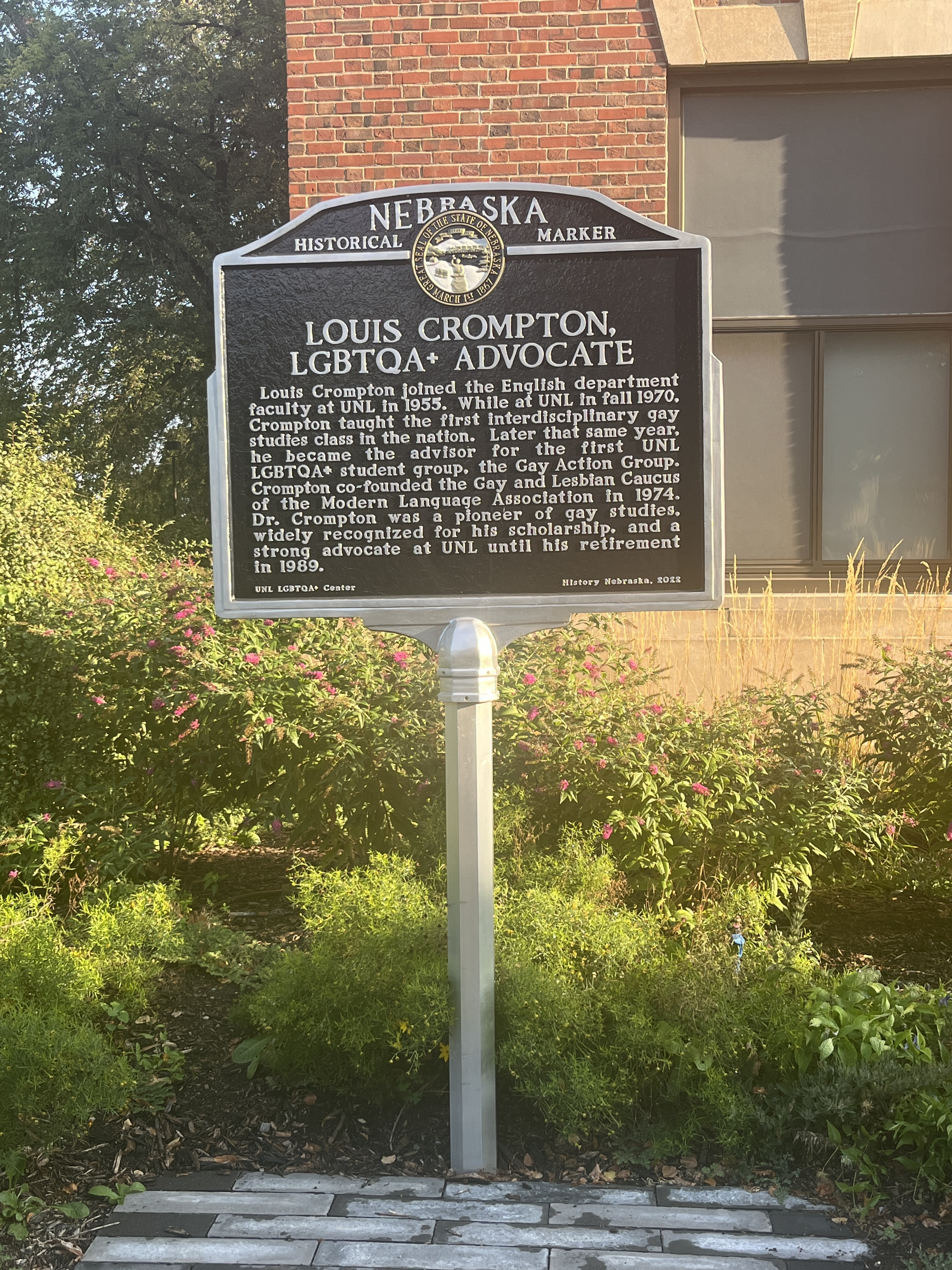
Marker for Louis Crompton in front of the English building at the University of Nebraska–Lincoln

Crompton received many awards and honors during his career, including the Bonnie Zimmerman and Vern L. Bullough Prize of the Foundation for the Scientific Study of Sexuality award for 2003 for his book Homosexuality and Civilization, which covers 2500 years of world history.

At the time of his death, Crompton, who had retired to California, was a professor emeritus of English at UNL. He was survived by his partner of forty years, Luis Diaz-Perdomo, also a former UNL faculty member who served many years with Counseling and Psychological Services at UNL and facilitated the Gay Men's Discussion Group.

In 2009, a scholarship was established at UNL in Crompton's name for students working toward "a more just, inclusive society for the LGBTQ community"; the first award to a student was made in 2013.

== Works ==
Books written by Crompton include:

- Shaw the Dramatist. University of Nebraska Press, 1969. ISBN 0803200315
- Byron and Greek Love: Homophobia in 19th-century England. University of California Press, 1985. ISBN 0520051726
- Homosexuality and Civilization. Belknap Press of Harvard University Press, 2003. ISBN 067401197X
