= Wallada bint al-Mustakfi =

11th-century Andalusian royal (d. 1091)

Wallada bint al-Mustakfi ولادة بنت المستكفي
- Born: Wallada bint Muhammad; 994 or 1001; Córdoba, Caliphate of Córdoba
- Died: 26 March 1091; Córdoba, Taifa of Córdoba
- Burial: Córdoba, Spain
- Dynasty: Umayyad
- Occupation: Poet

Wallada bint al-Mustakfi (Arabic: ولادة بنت المستكفي) (born in Córdoba in 994 or 1001 – 26 March 1091) was an Andalusian poet and the daughter of the Umayyad Caliph Muhammad III of Córdoba.

== Early life ==
Wallada was the daughter of Muhammad III of Córdoba, one of the last Umayyad Cordoban rulers, who came to power in 1024 after assassinating the previous ruler Abderraman V, and who himself was assassinated two years later in Uclés. Her mother is generally believed to have been an Iberian Christian slave, possibly named Sukkara al-Mawruriyaa. Her early childhood was during the high period of the Caliphate of Córdoba, under the rule of Al-Mansur Ibn Abi Aamir. Her adolescent years came during the tumultuous period following the eventual succession of Aamir's son, Sanchuelo, who in his attempts to seize power from Hisham II brought the caliphate into civil war.

As Muhammad III had no male heir, some scholars suggest that Wallada inherited his properties, and used them to create a sort of literary salon in Córdoba. There she acted as a mentor to poets, especially but not exclusively women, from all social classes, from those of noble birth to slaves purchased by Wallada herself. Some of the great poets and intellectuals of the time also attended.

== Image and artistry ==
Wallada had a reputation for intelligence, quick-mindedness, eloquence, and depth of knowledge. She also was somewhat controversial, walking out in public without a veil. Her behavior was regarded by the local imams as perverse and was strongly criticized, but she also had numerous people who defended her, such as Ibn Hazm, the famous author of The Ring of the Dove. Wallada gained recognition for her poetry skills, particularly notable as a woman in what was a male-dominated field.

One example of Wallada's work and audacious character is illustrated by the verses of her own poetry she had embroidered on her clothes. On the shoulders of her cape were the following lines, in the wafir meter.

أَنَا وَاللهِ أَصْلُحُ لِلْمَعَالِي
وَأَمْشِي مِشْيَتِي وَأَتِيهُ تِيها

أُمْكِنُ عَاشِقِي مِنْ صَحْنِ خَدّي
وَأُعْطِي قُبْلَتِي مَنْ يَشْتَهِيها

ʾanā wallāhi aṣluḥu lilmʿālī
wa amshī mishyati wa atīhu tīhā

ʾumkinu ʿāshiqī min ṣaḥni khaddī
wa ʾuʿṭī qublatī man yashtahīhā

I am, by Allah, fit for high positions.
and am going by my way with pride.

Forsooth I allow my lover to kiss my cheek,
and bestow my kisses on him who craves it.

Some of Wallada's poetry was in free verse, uncommon at the time.

Only nine of Wallada's poems have been preserved. Eight of these are about her relationship with Ibn Zaydun. The ninth alludes to Wallada's liberty and independence.

Wallada has been called the "Arabic Sappho."

In poems about Wallada, Ibn Zaydun describes her as light-skinned, light-haired, and blue-eyed.

== Later life and significant relationships ==
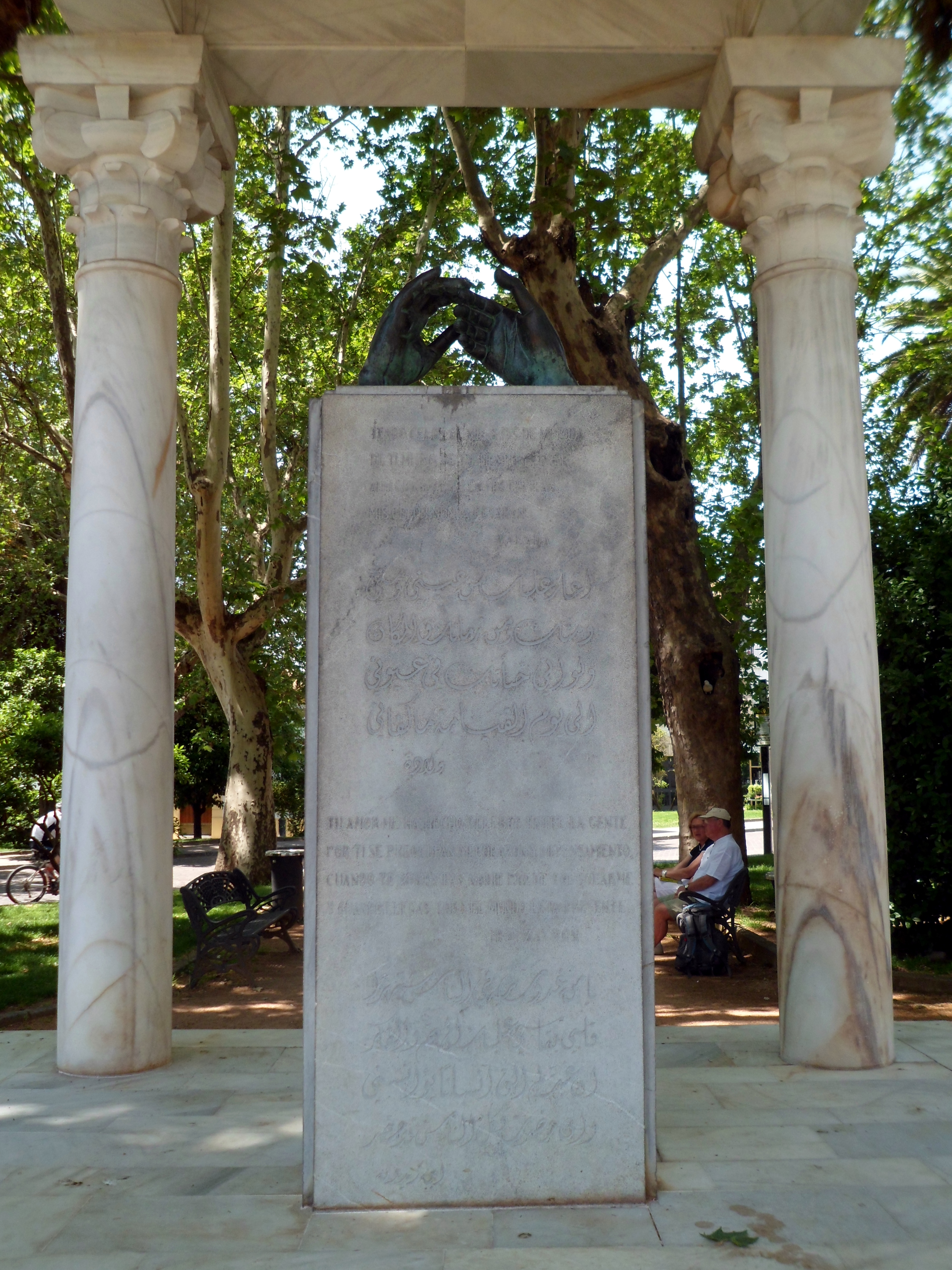
Monumento a los Enamorados (Monument to the Lovers) in Córdoba

Much of Wallada's poetry featured her romantic and sexual relationships, and much about her that is known comes from her extant poetry and poetry written about her by her lovers.

=== With Muhja bint al-Tayyani ===
Wallada wrote many poems in praise of the female poet Muhja bint al-Tayyani, likely Wallada's lover. As these poems were very sexually explicit, they were not cited by subsequent authors and are now lost, probably intentionally.

Muhja also wrote poems about Wallada, which suggest that Wallada was at one point pregnant.

=== With Ibn Zaydun ===
Wallada met Ibn Zaydun during a poetry competition, a Cordoban custom of the time. Ibn Zaydun was also a poet and a nobleman who had been making measured political strides in Cordoba. Because of this and Ibn Zaydun's ties with the Banu Yahwar — rivals of her own Umayyad clan — their relationship was controversial and had to remain a secret.

Most of Wallada's surviving poems are those that were written about this relationship. Some of these depict Wallada in a relationship role traditionally held by men; for example, she wrote about undertaking "perilous journeys" to visit Ibn Zaydun, a conventional type of relationship instigation normally made by men.

Written as letters, Wallada's poems express jealousy, nostalgia, but also a desire to reunite. Another expresses deception, sorrow and reproach. Five are sharp satires directed against Ibn Zaydun, whom she accuses of infidelity with men, among other things. Surviving poems about this relationship suggest that it was not a happy one; in addition to poetic criticism from both parties, Ibn Zaydun also likely beat Wallada, and was not faithful to her. In one writing, it was implied that the relationship ended because of an affair between Ibn Zaydun and a "Black lover". Wallada suggests that the lover was a slave girl purchased and educated as a poet by Wallada herself, though others speculate that this person could have been a man. However, infidelity with Black lovers was a common theme in Arabic poetry, and so it is also possible that this detail was a literary invention.

Ibn Zaydun continued to dedicate poems to Wallada, and write extensively about her, for years after their separation.

=== With Ibn Abdus ===
After her split with Ibn Zaydun, Wallada entered a relationship with the vizier Abu Amir Ibn Abdus, who was one of Ibn Zaydun's major political rivals. Ibn Abdus, who was completely enamored with Wallada, would end up seizing Ibn Zaydun's properties and having him imprisoned. Soon afterwards Wallada moved into the vizier's palace, and although she never married him, he remained by her side until his death, well into his eighties.

== In popular culture ==
Wallada's name (spelled "Valada") appears on the Heritage Floor of Judy Chicago's art installation The Dinner Party.

In the videogame Crusader Kings 3 she appears as a playable character if playing with the Roads To Power DLC under the name "Mistress Wallada Umayyad". In the game she is depicted as the last of the Umayyad Dynasty and is granted a unique artifact called The Double Moon Tome, a book of poetry while having a unique trait, "Violet Poet".

In 2024, Spanish film producer Pedro Alonso Pablos released an animated feature film dedicated to Wallada and her lover Ibn Zaydun titled Abenzaidún y Wallada, amor eterno.

== See also ==
- Muwashshah
