= Ibn al-Khatib =

Andalusi polymath, poet and historian (1313–1374)

- ابن الخطيب
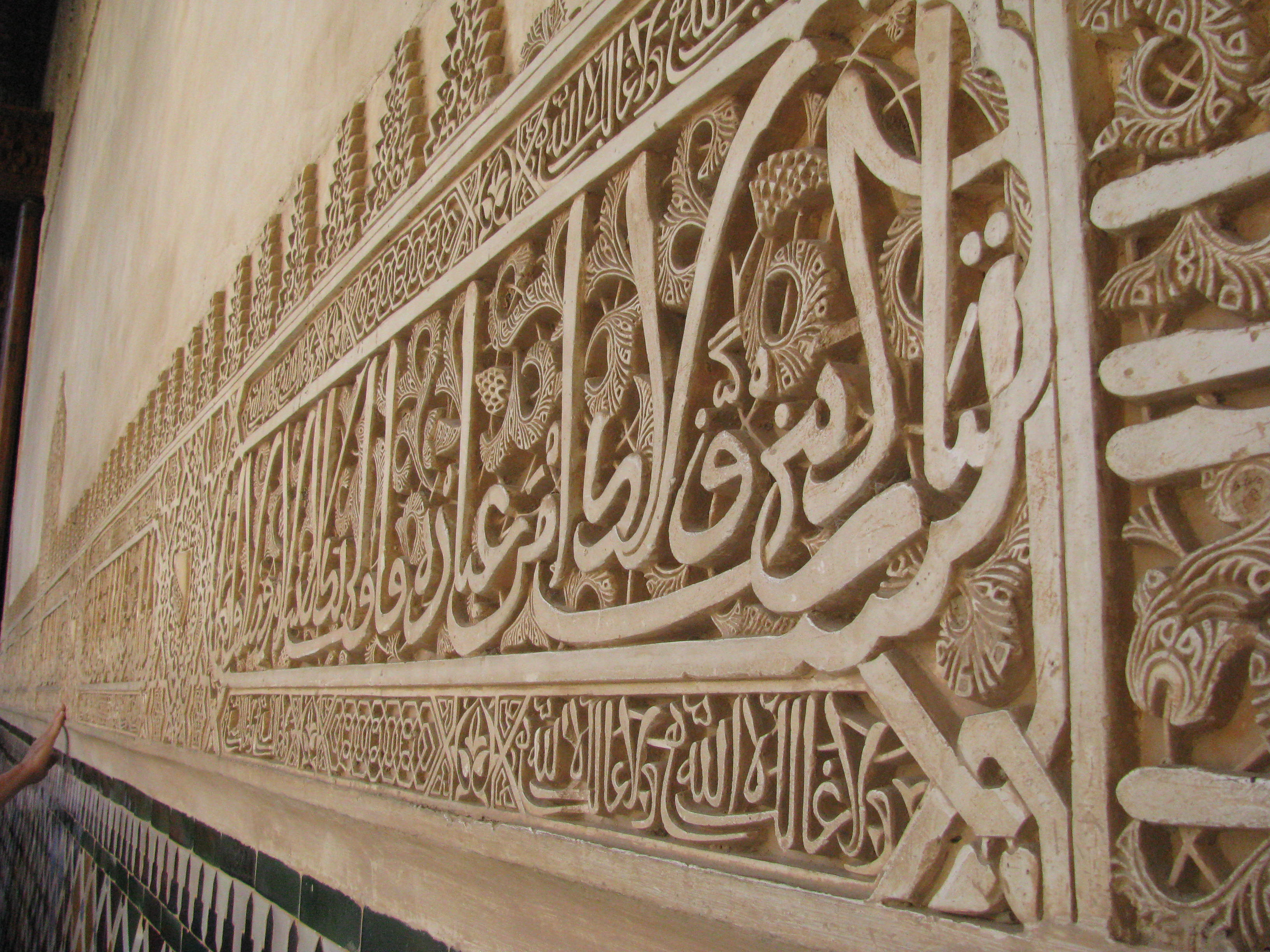
- An inscription in the Court of the Myrtles of the Alhambra, where poetry by Ibn al-Khatib is inscribed.
- Born: November 16, 1313 Rajab 26 713 AH; Lawshah, Emirate of Granada
- Died: 1374 AD, 776 AH; Fes, Marinid Sultanate
- Cause of death: Strangulation
- Resting place: Bab Mahruq; 34°03′45″N 4°59′9.8″W
- Education: Madrasa Yusufiyya
- Occupations: Poet, historian, statesman, physician
- Era: Islamic golden age

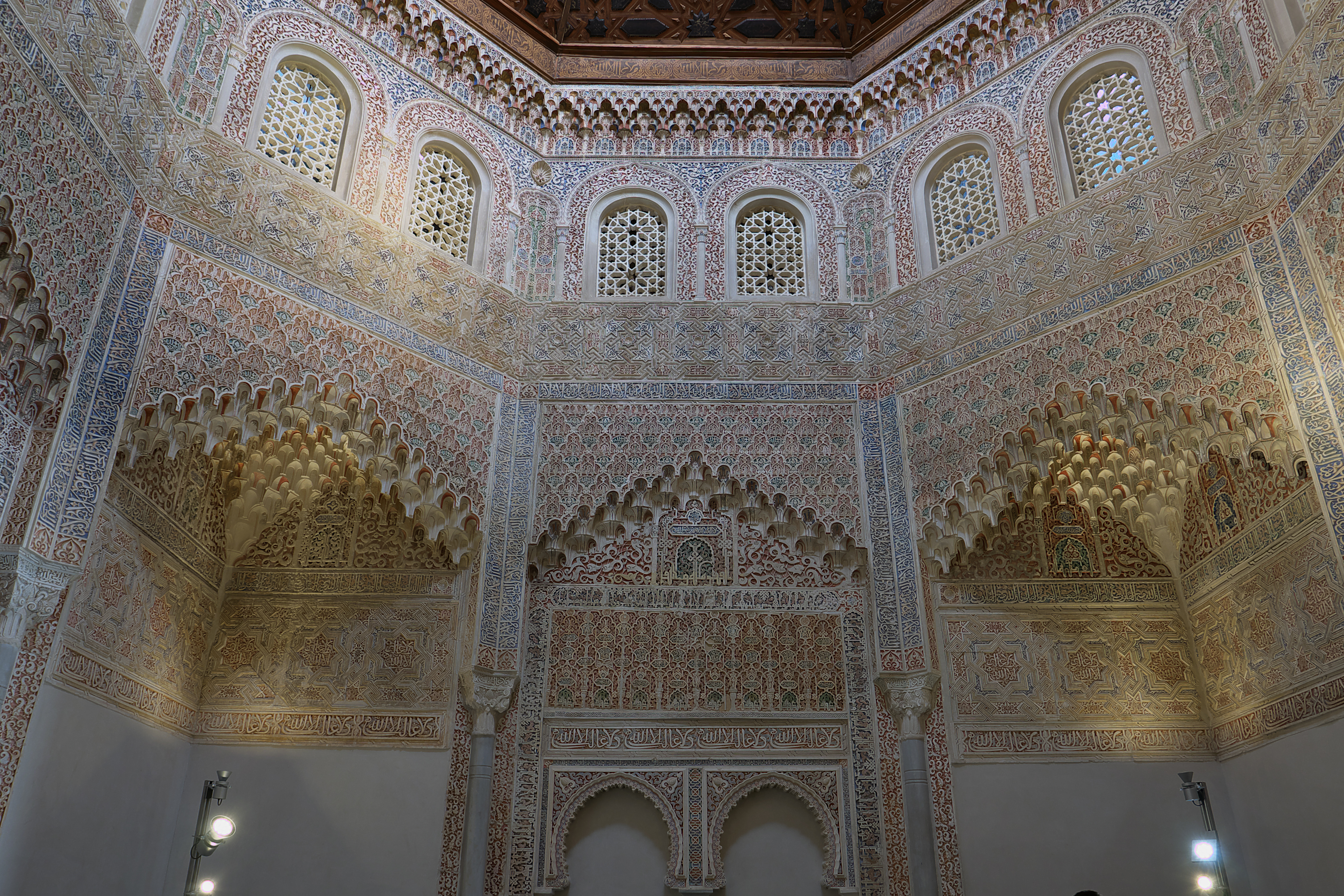
Ibn al-Khatib studied at the Madrasa of Granada.

Lisan ad-Din Ibn al-Khatib (Note: Arabic: لسان الدين ابن الخطيب, romanized: Lisān ad-Dīn Ibn al-Khaṭīb, full name in Arabic: محمد بن عبد الله بن سعيد بن عبد الله بن سعيد بن علي بن أحمد السّلماني, romanized: Muḥammad ibn ʿAbdallāh ibn Saʿīd ibn ʿAbdallāh ibn Saʿīd ibn ʿAlī ibn Aḥmad as-Salmānī) (Arabic: لسان الدين ابن الخطيب; 16 November 1313 – 1374) was an Arab Andalusi polymath who was active as a poet, writer, historian, philosopher, physician and politician from Emirate of Granada. Being one of the most notable poets from Granada, his poems decorate the walls of the palace of Alhambra. He is known for composing the muwashshaḥāt "Jadaka al-Ghaithu" and possibly "Lamma Bada Yatathanna."

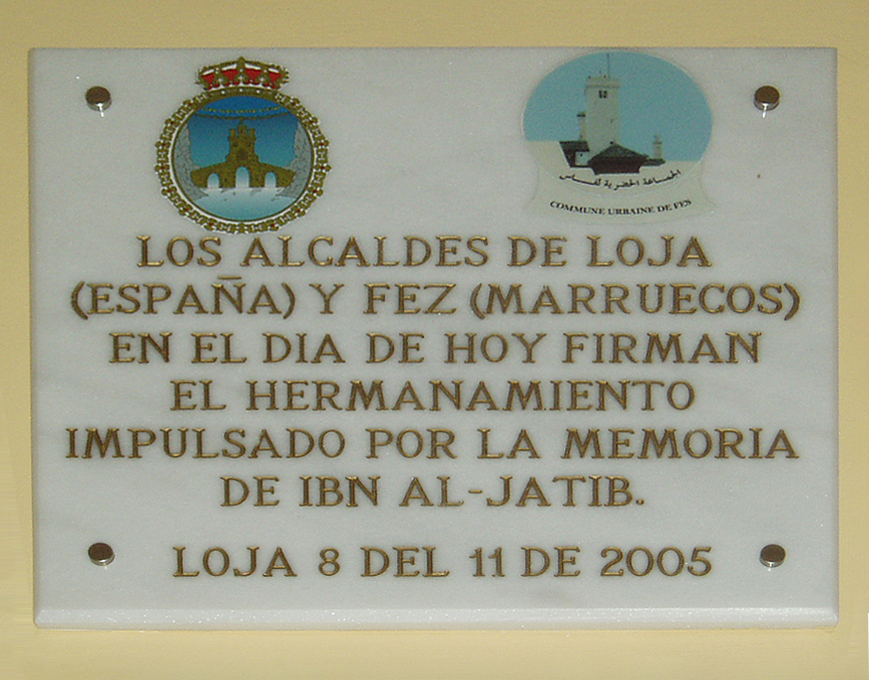
Ibn al-Khatib memorial

Ibn Al-Khatib is highly esteemed both as a historian and as a poet. He was a contemporary and acquaintance of Ibn Khaldun.

His most significant historical work, The Complete Source on the History of Granada (الإحاطة في أخبار غرناطة), written in 1369 AD, which includes his autobiography, has yet to be translated into English.

== Biography ==
Ibn al-Khatib was born at Loja, Granada. Shortly after his birth, his father was appointed to a high post at the court of Emir Ismail I in Granada. After his father and older brother were killed in the Battle of Río Salado in 1340, Ibn al-Khatib was hired to work as a secretary for his former teacher Ibn al-Jayyab, vizier to Emir Yusuf I. Following Ibn al-Jayyab's early death from the plague, Ibn al-Khatib became vizier and head of the emiri chancery, serving also in diplomatic roles in the courts of Andalusi and Maghrebi rulers.

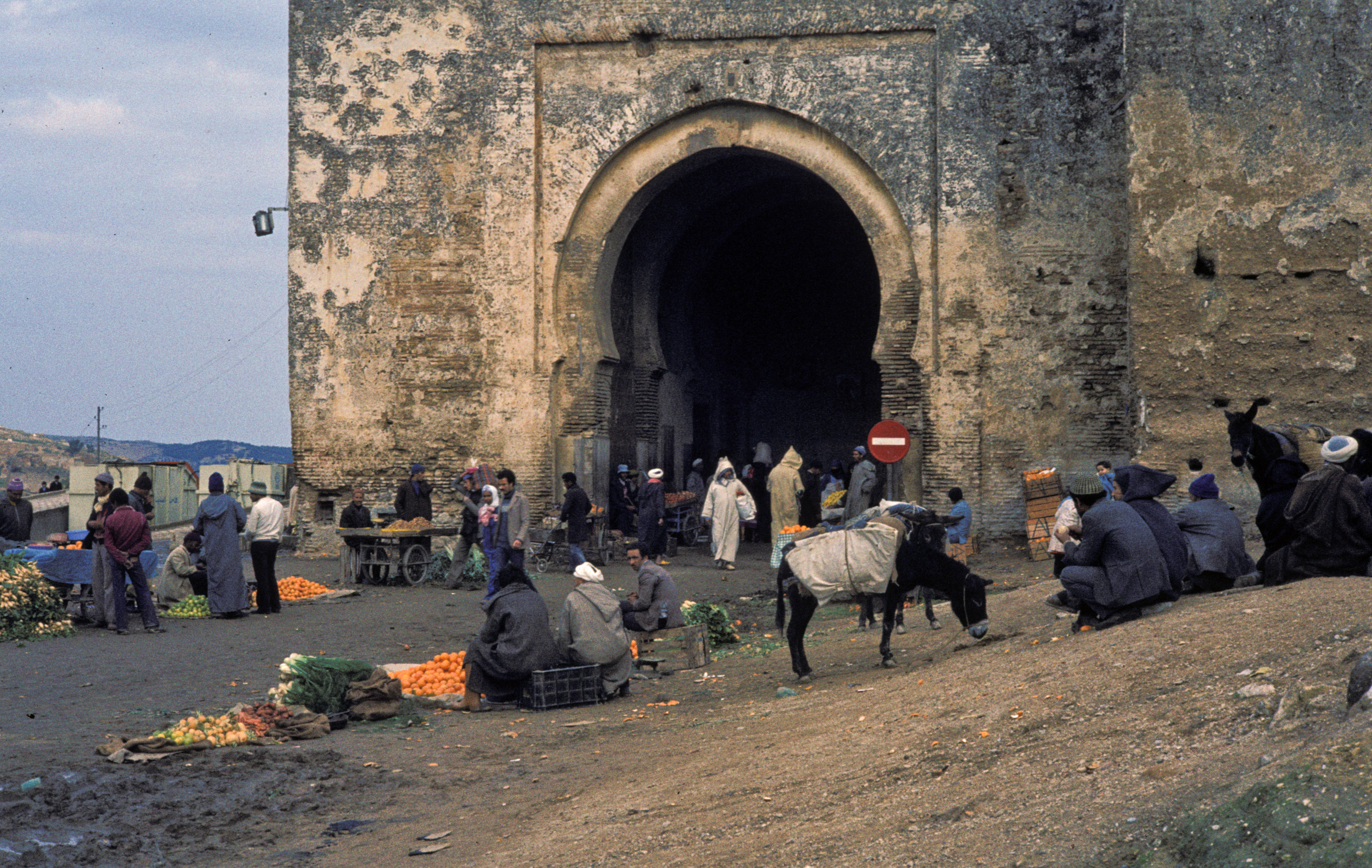
Bab Mahrouk in Fes, where Ibn al-Khatib was buried, in 1982.

For much of his life he was vizier at the court of the Sultan of Granada, Muhammed V. He spent two periods in exile in the Marinid empire (between 1360 and 1362 and 1371–74). He resided variously at Ceuta, Tlemcen and Fes). In 1374, he was imprisoned for zandaqa ("heresy") and was sentenced to death by suffocation. Earlier and modern historians have speculated that his many private and political feuds with the Emirs of Granada belonging to the Nasrid dynasty were probably the main factors in his treatment and execution. His body was burned before being buried at Bab Mahruq, a city gate in Fes.

== Poetry ==
His poetry was influenced by court poets from the Mashriq, or Islamic east, especially Abū Nuwās, Abū Tammām, and al-Mutanabbī. Ibn al-Khatib was a master of saj' (سجع, rhymed prose), especially in his maqamāt.

== On the Plague ==
In his treatise about the plague (Muqni'at al-Sā'il 'an al-Maraḍ al-Hā'il, c. 753/1362), Ibn al-Khatib explores the idea of transmission of disease through contagion centuries before Louis Pasteur conducted his experiments in Europe. The original Arabic text is preserved in the Zaydani Library at El Escorial, MS Arabic 1785. Of the estimated deaths due to the outbreak of bubonic plague, known as the "Black Death", which swept through al-Andalus in the 14th century, the numbers range to as high as a third of the Muslim population worldwide.

In his treatise On the Plague, Ibn al-Khatib writes:

"The existence of contagion is established by experience [and] by trustworthy reports on transmission by garments, vessels, ear-rings; by the spread of it by persons from one house, by infection of a healthy sea-port by an arrival from an infected land [and] by the immunity of isolated individuals."

Although this discovery is generally credited to al-Khatib's insight, the well-known plague hadith found in both Sahih al-Bukhari and Sahih Muslim appears to have already documented this observation (Sahih al-Bukhari 5728):

Narrated Saud: The Prophet (ﷺ) said, "If you hear of an outbreak of plague in a land, do not enter it; but if the plague breaks out in a place while you are in it, do not leave that place."

A similar narration can be found in Sahih Muslim 2218c.

== Death ==
A detailed account of his demise was written down by Ibn Khaldun, a friend and admirer of his. As a loyal courtier of Muhammed V of Granada, Ibn al-Khatib was arrested in the wake of a 1359 coup by Muhammed's half-brother Ismail, and had his property confiscated. He was soon released due to interference by the Marinid sultan of Morocco. He joined a host of Andalusi refugees in Morocco, settling in the Atlantic town of Salé. He immersed himself in Sufi mysticism and writing. During this stay in Morocco, he first met Ibn Khaldun and other important North African intellectuals such as ibn Marzuq.

In 1362, the former emir of Granada, Muhammed V, was able to regain the throne with help from the Moroccan sultan. This allowed Ibn al-Khatib to return to Granada and resume the office of Great Vizier (dhu al-wizaratayn, i.e. 'possessor of the two vizierates', meaning 'head of both the civil and military authority'). He soon ran afoul of severe political intrigue. He eventually strengthened his position while organizing the expulsion of several of his North African political rivals from Granada. His political successes caused friction within Granada between supporters of the expelled North Africans and the politically savvy Ibn al-Khatib. When Ibn Khaldun had some diplomatic success at Granada's court, Ibn al-Khatib, fearing him as a rival, organized his expulsion.

His intrigues had made him an unpopular figure in some circles, causing two of his students, ibn Zamrak and ibn Farkun, to join hands with his most powerful enemy in Granada, the Grand Qadi al-Nubahi, a man who had long held a grudge against Ibn al-Khatib. More importantly, emir Muhammed V had grown distrustful of Ibn al-Khatib for his overbearing control of the Granadan state and his strict loyalty to the Marinids of Morocco. Feeling the heat rise, in 1371, Ibn al-Khatib left for North Africa, where he was well received by the Marinid sultan Abu Faris Abd al-Aziz I. During his refuge, the Grand Qadi al-Nubahi issued a fatwa in which Ibn al-Khatib's work on Sufism and philosophy was branded heretical and his work was ordered burned. The ad hominem nature of al-Nubahi's legal decision strongly suggests that he had a personal grudge against Ibn al-Khatib. Ibn al-Khatib wrote a refutation of the fatwa, in which he harshly attacked al-Nubahi. Numerous attempts by Granada to get Ibn al-Khatib either deported or executed were fruitless, as the Sultan refused to do so. Though Abu Faris Abd al-Aziz I soon died, ibn al-Khatib was then protected by ibn Ghazi, Morocco's main vizier.

Ibn al-Khatib's future turned bleak when a Granada-supported coup removed ibn Ghazi from office and brought a new sultan to power, Abu al-Abbas Ahmad al-Mustansir. Indebted to Granada, the new sultan ordered Ibn al-Khatib to be arrested and a trial be held in the Moroccan capital city of Fes, in which a Granadan group of emissaries, including his former student Ibn Zamrak, was actively involved. Despite intimidation and torture, Ibn al-Khatib kept protesting his innocence throughout the trial and denied the accusations of heresy. The final vote was far from unanimous, and a council of Islamic scholars could not reach a conclusive decision. Ibn al-Khatib was said to have been strangled on the night of his trial, as the people couldn't reach a conclusion on his alleged heresy and thus didn't want him to receive an unjust verdict. On the following day, his body was buried near Fes' Bab al-Mahruq city gate. Unsatisfied, his enemies ordered his body dug up and thrown in a bonfire.

== List of works ==
- The Appearance of a Ghost During a Trip of Winter and Summer (خطرة الطيف في رحلة الشتاء والصيف): a description of a 21-day journey from Granada to Almería with Yusuf I, Sultan of Granada, composed in rhyming couplets
- The Measurement of Choice in the Conditions of Places and Buildings (معيار الاختيار في ذكر المعاهد والديار): a muqama in which Ibn al-Khatib describes 34 Andalusi cities, including Malaga, Granada, and Ronda, comparing them to the Moroccan cities Tangier, Meknes, Fes, and Sebta, which he visited while exiled in Morocco
- The Shaking of the Bag for Entertainment While Abroad (نفاضة الجراب في علالة الاغتراب): a collection of praise poetry, writings on history and geography, and personal narrative on his journey from the High Atlas back to Al-Andalus
- The Badr View in the Nasirian State – Al-Lamhat al-Badriya fi al-Dawla al-Nasriya, ed. Arab and Latin transl. M.Casiri, Biblioteca arabico-hispana escurialensis, II, Madrid 1770.
- Compendium on Granada (in 5 vols.) – Al'Ihatat fi 'Akhbar Ghurnata (Arabic)
- Muqni'at al-Sā'il 'an al-Maraḍ al-Hā'il (مقنعة السائل عن المرض الهائل), a treatise on the Black Death and contagion, Zaydani Collection at the Biblioteca del Real Monasterio de El Escorial, MS Arabic 1785.
- The Scholars' Recitations of Dreams of the Kings of Islam
- Biographies, Dates and Connections – 'Awsaf an-Naas fi al-Tawarikh wa'l-Salaat (Arabic)
- A Clerk after the People Move (Politics of Granada and Morocco) – Kanasat al-Dukan baad Intaqal as-Sakan
- Kitab a'mal al-a'lam fi man buyi'a qabl al-ihtilam (Deeds of the Great: On Those Who Came to the Throne before Reaching Maturity)
- Calibrate Selection in Institutes of Mind
- Views of Sanseddin Ben Khatib in Morocco and Andalusia
- Malaga and Sala
- The Masterpiece of the Book and the Purity of the Elect
- Magic and Poetry
- The Book of Rehana and the sorrow of the Creator
- Garden Definition of Sharif Love
- A Message in Politics

== Bibliography ==
- Jaysh Al-Tawshih of Lisan Al-Din Ibn Al-Khatib (Arabic), An Anthology of Andalusian Arabic Muwashshahat, Alan Jones (Editor), 1997 – ISBN 978-0-906094-42-6
- Lisan ad-Din Ibn al-Khatib, Tarikh Isbaniya Al Islamiya (history of Muslim Spain), ed. by Levi-Provençal, new edition, Cairo, 2004
- Lisan ad-Din Ibn al-Khatib, Awsaf Al Nas (description of peoples), Cairo, 2002
- Lisan ad-Din Ibn al-Khatib, Khaṭrat al-ṭayf : riḥlāt fī al-Maghrib wa-al-Andalus, 1347–1362, 2003
- Lisan ad-Din Ibn al-Khatib, Nafadhat al-jirab (the Ashtray of the Socks)
- Lisan al-Din ibn al-Khatib homme de lettres et historien, by Abdelbaqui Benjamaa, (French) thesis, Universite de la Sorbonne Nouvelle Paris III, 1992 (microform).

== See also ==
- Ibn abd al-Malik al-Murrakushi
