= Muhja bint al-Tayyani =

Eleventh-century Andalusian poet

- مهجة بنت التياني القرطبية
- Born: 11th century Córdoba, Al-Andalus (now Spain)
- Died: 1097; Córdoba, Al-Andalus (now Spain)
- Occupation: Poet
- Parent: Al-Tayyani (a fig merchant)
- Writing career
- Language: Arabic
- Notable works: Satires and love poems

Muhja bint al-Tayyani al-Qurtubiyya (Arabic: مهجة بنت التياني القرطبية) (born in Córdoba, died in Córdoba 1097 CE) was an eleventh-century Andalusian poet.

She was the daughter of a Cordoban merchant who was engaged in the sale of figs. At some point, she met the famous poet Princess Wallada, who took her into her house — which served as a school of poetry for women — and mentored her. Muhja became a celebrated poet, a profession that had a great recognition in Andalusian society. Wallada was extremely fond of Muhja, writing her passionate (and rather explicit) love poetry, and there are suggestions they may have been lovers.

== Poems ==
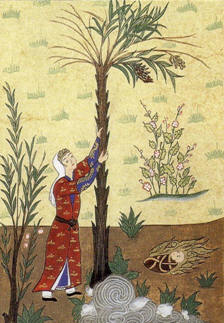
Sixteenth-century CE Turkish picture of Mary shaking the palm tree for dates.

Muhja dedicated ferocious satires to her teacher:

Original	Transliteration (ALA-LC)	Literal translation
وَلّادة قَدْ صِرْتِ وَلّادة\\مِن غَيْرِ بَعَلٍ فَضَحَ الكاتِمُ حَكَت لَنا مَرْيَم لَكِنّه\\نَخْلة هَذي ذَكَرٌ قائِمُ	Wallādah qad ṣirti wallādah min ghayri baʿalin faḍaḥa al-kātimu ḥakat lanā Maryam lākinnah nakhlat hādhī dhakaru qāʾimu.	Wallada has become fecund by another man; the secret-keeper revealed it. To us, she resembled Mary, but this palm-tree is an erect penis.

This poem puns on Wallada's name, which literally means 'fecund'. It compares Wallada, ostensibly pregnant out of wedlock, to the Virgin Mary. The poem shifts from a literary register in the first half to a colloquial one in the second (characterised by the colloquial form hāḏī in place of classical hāḏihi). The second half alludes specifically to the Islamic account of the virgin birth, in which Mariam received a divine instruction to shake the trunk of a date palm while giving birth to Jesus, so that its fruits fall down to her. In Muhya's account, Wallada has grasped a penis to similar effect.

Another example is this verse:

يا متحفا بالخوخ أحبابه\\أهلا به من مثلج للصدور
حكى ثدي الغيد تفليكه\\لكنه أخزى رؤوس الأيور

Translation:

Away from the gouache of his lips
to those who want it,
just as the border defends itself from those who besiege it,
one is defended by sabers and spears,
and those who are protected by the magic of her eyes.
