= Ibn Sahl of Seville =

Andalusian Moorish poet

- أبو إسحاق إبرهيم بن سهل الإسرائيلي الإشبيلي
- Born: 1212; Seville, Al-Andalus
- Died: 1251 (aged 38–39)
- Occupation: Poet
- Writing career
- Notable work: Diwan of Ibn Sahl

Ibn Sahl (Arabic: أبو إسحاق إبرهيم بن سهل الإسرائيلي الإشبيلي, Abu Ishaq Ibrahim Ibn Sahl al-Isra'ili al-Ishbili) of Seville (1212–1251) is considered one of the greatest Andalusi poets of the 13th century. He was a Jewish convert to Islam.

The diwan of Ibn Sahl contains the most refined examples of Andalusian poetry, almost exclusively love poetry and muwashshahat. Mostly known for his love poetry in muwashshah form, Ibn Sahl's two young male lover addressees, Mûsâ ibn ʿAbd al-Ṣamad and Muḥammad, are thought by some to represent the two religions that played important roles in his life, his original Judaism and the Islam to which he converted. Others hold that the youths were historical individuals.

The Moroccan author Mohammed al-Ifrani (1670–1747) wrote a biography of Ibn Sahl.
