= Ibn Zaydun =

11th-century Andalusian poet and writer

Ibn Zaydun ابن زيدون
- Born: 1003; Cordoba, Caliphate of Córdoba
- Died: 1071 (aged 67–68); Seville, Taifa of Seville
- Occupation: Poet
- Writing career
- Period: Islamic Golden Age

Abū al-Walīd Aḥmad Ibn Zaydouni al-Makhzūmī (Arabic: أبو الوليد أحمد بن زيدوني المخزومي; 1003–1071), or simply known as Ibn Zaydoun (Arabic: ابن زيدون) or Abenzaidun, was an Arab Andalusian poet of Cordoba and Seville. He was considered the greatest neoclassical poet of al-Andalus.

He reinvigorated the impassioned lyrics in Arabic by infusing it with more personal and sensual tones of experience. This supposed him to be considered the best of the loving poets of the Muslim Hispania and to become a model for all subsequent Western Arabic poetry. His love affair with the princess and poet Wallada bint al-Mustakfi and his exile inspired many of his poems.

== Life and work ==
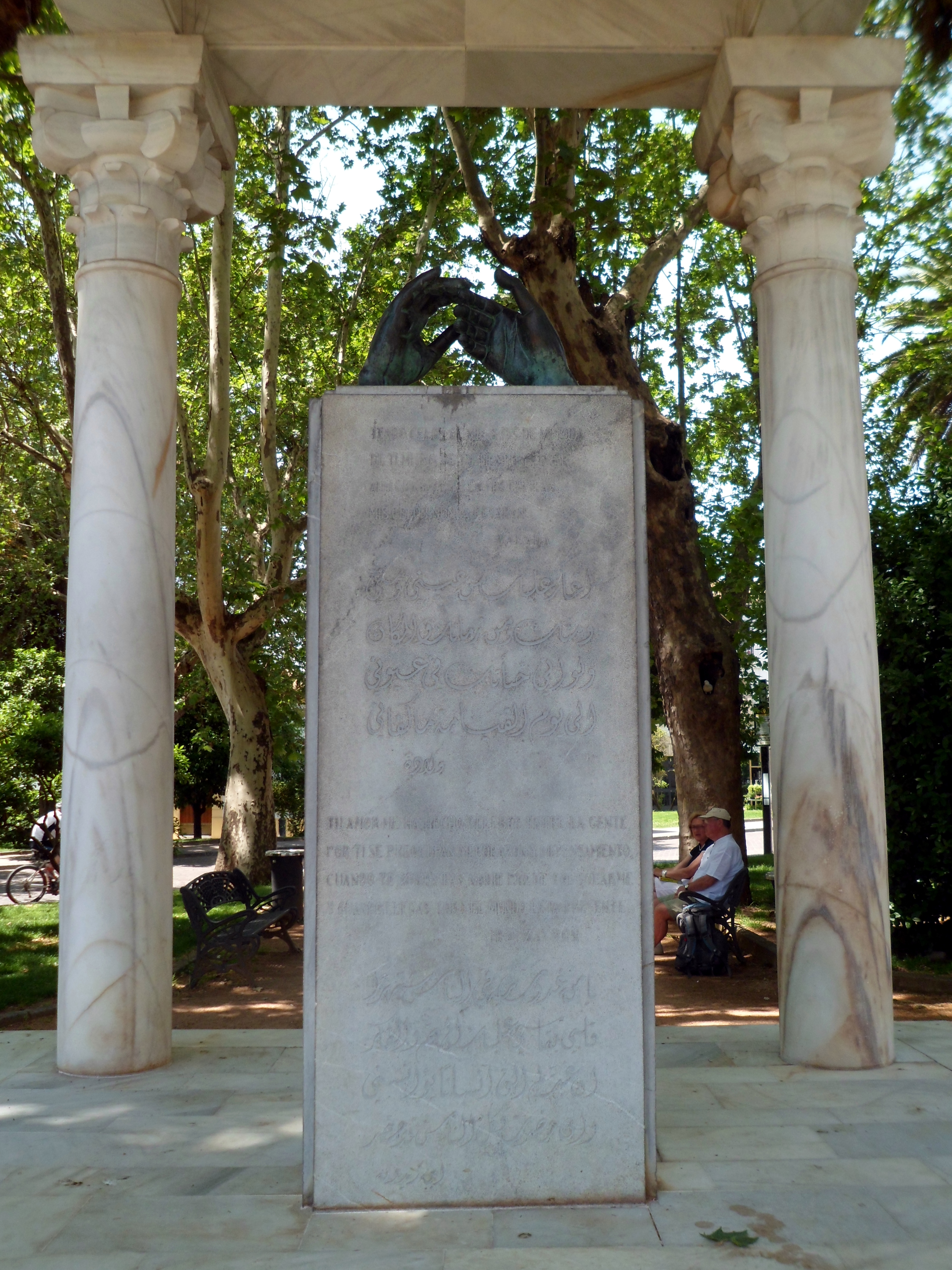
Monument for Ibn Zaydun and Wallada, Córdoba

Ibn Zayduni was born in 1003 in Cordoba to an aristocratic Andalusian Arab family descended from the Banu Makhzum. He grew up during the decline of the Caliphate of Córdoba and was involved in the political life of his age. He joined the court of the Jahwarid Abu al-Hazm of Cordoba, but then was imprisoned by him after accusations that Ibn Zaydun conspired against him and his patrons.

His relationship with the Umayyad princess Wallada was quickly terminated by Wallada herself. Some attributed this change of heart to Ibn Zayduni's early anti-Umayyad activities, while others mention his rivalry with the rich minister Ibn Abdus, a former friend of Ibn Zayduni, who supposedly gains Wallada's favor and supported her. It is suggested that Ibn Abdus himself was the one who instigated Abu al-Hazm ibn Jahwar against Ibn Zaydun.

He sought refuge with Abbad II of Seville and his son al-Mu'tamid. He was able to return home for a period after the ruler of Seville conquered Cordoba. Much of his life was spent in exile and the themes of lost youth and nostalgia for his city are present in many of his poems. In a poem about Cordoba he remembers his city and his youth:

God has sent showers upon abandoned dwelling places of those we loved. He has woven upon them a striped many-coloured garment of flowers, and raised among them a flower like a star. How many girls like images trailed their garmets among such flowers, when life was fresh and time was at our service...How happy were, those days that have passed, days of pleasure, when we lived with those who had back flowing hair and white shoulders

His romantic and literary life was dominated by his relations with the poet Wallada bint al-Mustakfi, the daughter of the Umayyad Caliph Muhammad III of Cordoba. According to Jayyusi in her book The Legacy of Muslim Spain, "Ibn Zayduni brought into Andalusi poetry something of balance, the rhetorical command, the passionate power and grandeur of style that marked contemporary poetry in the east...he rescued Andalusi poetry from the self-indulgence of the poets of externalized description."

== Bibliography ==
- Ahmad ibn Abd Allāh Ibn Zaydūn, Mahmūd Subh. (1979). Poesias, Instituto Hispano-Árabe de Cultura, ed. University of Virginia.
- Concha Lagos. (1984). Con el arco a punto Instituto Hispano-Arabe de Cultura. University of California. ISBN 84-7472-057-5.
- Sieglinde Lug. (1982). Poetic Techniques and Conceptual Elements in Ibn Zaydūn's Love Poetry, University Press of America (based on the author's thesis).
- Devin J. Stewart, 'Ibn Zaydūn', in The Cambridge History of Arabic Literature: The Literature of Al-Andalus, ed. by Maria Rosa Menocal, Raymond P. Scheindlin and Michael Sells (Cambridge: Cambridge University Press, 2000), pp. 306–17.
- S. Jayyusi. (1992). The Legacy of Muslim Spain. pp. 343–351.
