= Medieval Arabic female poets =

In the surviving historical record, medieval Arabic female poets are few compared with the number of known male Arabic-language poets, and many compared with the number of the very few women who wrote in any European language traditions of the same time periods. Within Arabic literature, there has been "an almost total eclipse of women's poetic expression in the literary record as maintained in Arabic culture from the pre-Islamic era through the nineteenth century". However, there is evidence that, compared with the medieval poetry of Europe, women's poetry in the medieval Islamic world was "unparalleled" in "visibility and impact". Accordingly, since the beginning of the twenty-first century, scholars have emphasised that women's contribution to Arabic literature requires greater scholarly attention.

== Attestation ==
A substantial corpus of the work of medieval Arabic language women poets survives; the earliest extensive anthology is the late ninth-century CE Balāghāt al-nisāʾ by Ibn Abī Ṭāhir Ṭayfūr (d. 280/893). Abd al-Amīr Muhannā named over four hundred female poets in his anthology., making the quantity of poetry by pre-modern women in the Arabic language remarkable by any standard, and making it odd that it is continually referred to in terms of scarcity. That much literature by women was once collected in writing but has since been lost is suggested particularly by the fact that al-Suyuti's 15th-century Nuzhat al-julasāʼ fī ashʻār al-nisāʼ mentions a large (six-volume or longer) anthology called Akhbar al-Nisa' al-Shau‘a'ir containing "ancient" women’s poetry, assembled by one Ibn al-Tarrah (d. 720/1320). However, a range of medieval anthologies do contain women's poetry, including collections by Al-Jahiz, Abu Tammam, Abu al-Faraj al-Isfahani, and Ibn Bassam, alongside historians quoting women's poetry such as Muhammad ibn Jarir al-Tabari, Yaqut al-Hamawi, and Ibn 'Asakir.

Medieval women's poetry in Arabic tends to be stereotyped as belonging mostly to two genres: the rithā’ (elegy) and ghazal (love-song), alongside a smaller body of Sufi poems and short pieces in the low-status rajaz metre. Less noticed is the fact that it also ranges over nature poetry, poetry of sexuality, hija, and other topics. One significant corpus comprises poems by qiyan, women who were slaves highly trained in the arts of entertainment, often educated in the cities of Basra, Ta’if, and Medina. Women's poetry is particularly well attested from Al-Andalus.

According to Samer M. Ali,

In retrospect we can discern four overlapping persona types for poetesses in the Middle Ages: the grieving mother/sister/daughter (al-Khansāʾ, al-Khirniq bint Badr, and al-Fāriʿah bint Shaddād), the warrior-diplomat (al-Hujayjah), the princess (al-Ḥurqah, ʿUlayyah bint al-Mahdī, and Walladah bint al-Mustakfī), and the courtesan-ascetic (ʿArīb, Shāriyah, and Rābiʿah al-ʿAdawīyah). Rābiʿah’s biography in particular projects a paradoxical persona that embodies the complementary opposites of sexuality and saintliness.

While most Arabic-speaking medieval woman poets were Muslim, of the three probable medieval female Jewish poets whose work has survived, two composed in Arabic: Qasmūna bint Ismāʿil and the sixth-century Sarah of Yemen (the remaining, Hebrew language poet being the anonymous wife of Dunash ben Labrat).

== Known female poets ==
The following list of known women poets is based on (but not limited to) Abdullah al-Udhari's Classical Poems by Arab Women. It is not complete.

=== Jahilayya (4000 BCE–622 CE) ===
- Mahd al-Aadiyya (Arabic: مَهد العادية, c. 4000 BCE)
- Afira bint 'Abbad (Arabic: عَفِيرة بنت عَبََّاد, C3 CE)
- Laila bint Lukaiz (Arabic: لَيْلَى بنت لُكِيْز, d. 483 CE)
- Jalila bint Murra (Arabic: جليلة بنتُ مُرَّة, d. 540 CE)
- Umama bint Kulaib (Arabic: أُمَامَة بنت كُلَيْب, C5–6 CE)
- al-Ḥujayjah, a.k.a. Safīyah bint Thaʻlabah al-Shaybānīyah (Arabic: صفية بنت ثعلبة الشيبانية, C5–6 CE)
- al-Ḥurqah (Arabic: الحُرقة, C5–6 CE)
- Safiyya bint Khalid al-Bahiliyya (Arabic: صفية بنت خالد الباهلية)
- Juhaifa Addibabiyya (Arabic: جُحَيْفَة الضَّبَابية)
- Umm Khalid Annumairiyya (Arabic: أُمُّ خَالد النُّمَيْريّة)
- Ishraqa al-Muharibiyya (Arabic: عِشْرَقة المحاربية)
- Umm Jamil bint Harb (Arabic: أم جميل بنت حرب, C6–7 CE)
- Hind bint al-Khuss al-Iyādiyya (Arabic: هند بنت الخس الإيادية, legendary, supposedly C6-7 CE)
- Hind bint ‘Utbah (Arabic: هند بنت عتبة, C6-7 CE)
- Qutayla ukht al-Nadr (Arabic: قُتيلة أخت النضر, C7 CE)
- Umm Addahak al-Muheribiyya (Arabic: أم الضحّاك المحاربية)
- Janūb Ukht ‘Amr dhī-l-Kalb (Arabic: جنوب أخت عمرو ذي الكلب النهدي)
- al-Fāriʿah bint Shaddād (Arabic: الفارعة بنت شداد)
- al-Khansa (Arabic: الخنساء, d. 646 CE)
- Sarah of Yemen (Arabic: سارة, C6 CE)

=== Period of Early Islam (622–661 CE) ===
- Al-Khansa, was one of the most influential poets of the pre-Islamic and early Islamic periods.
- Fatima bint Muhammad (Arabic: فاطمة بنت محمد, 605–632 CE)
- 'Amra bint Mardas (Arabic: عمرة بنت مرداس). Daughter of al-Khansa.
- Atiqa bint Zayd was the companion of Muhammad and an Arab poet.

=== Umayyad Period (661–750 CE) ===
- Laila bint Sa'd al-Aamiriyya (Arabic: ليلى بنت سعد العامرية, d. 668 CE)
- Maisūn bint Jandal (Arabic: ميسون بنت بَحْدل, c. C7 CE)
- Ḥumayda bint Nu‘mān ibn Bashīr (C7 CE)
- Laila al-Akhyaliyya (Arabic: ليلى الأخيلية, d. 75×90 AH/694×709 CE)
- Dahna bint Mas-hal (Arabic: الدهناء بنت مسحل, c. C7–8 CE)
- Bint al-Hubab (Arabic: ابنة الحباب)
- Umm al-Ward al-Ajlaniyya (Arabic: اُم الورد العجلانية)
- Umaima Addumainiyya (Arabic: اُميمة الدمَيْنِيَّة, C8 CE)

=== Abbasid Period (750–1258 CE) ===
- Hajna bint Nusaib (Arabic: الحجناء بنت نصيب, c. C8–9 CE)
- Raabi'a al-Adwiyya (Arabic: رابعة العدوية, 714–801 CE)
- Laila bint Tarif (Arabic: لَيلْى بنت طريف, d. 815 CE)
- 'Ulayya bint al-Mahdi (Arabic: عُلَيّة بنت المهدي, 777–825 CE)
- Lubāna bīnt ‘Alī ibn al-Mahdī (Arabic: لُبَانَة بنت علي بن المهدي, c. C8–9 CE)
- Inan (Arabic: عِنان, d. 841 CE)
- 'Asiya al-Baghdadiyya (Arabic: آسِيَة البغداديّة, c. C9 CE)
- Zahra al-Kilabiyya (Arabic: زهَرْاء الكِلابية, c. C8–9 CE)
- Aa'isha bint al-Mu'tasim (Arabic: عائشة بنت المعتصم, c. C8–9 CE)
- Shāriyah (Arabic: شارِية, c. 815-70 CE)
- Fadl Ashsha'ira (Arabic: فضل الشاعرة, d. 871 CE)
- Zabba bint Umair ibn al-Muwarriq (Arabic: الزباء بنت عُمَير بن المُورَّق, c. C9 CE)
- Juml (Arabic: جُمل, C9 CE)
- Fatima al-Suqutriyya (Arabic: فاطمة السقطرية, C9 CE)
- Umm Ja'far bint 'Ali (Arabic: اُم جعفر بنت علي)
- Arib al-Ma'muniyya (Arabic: عَرِيب المأمونية, 797–890 CE)
- Thawab bint Abdullah al-Hanzaliyya (Arabic: ثواب بنت عبد اللّه الحنظلية)
- Salma bint al-Qaratisi (Arabic: سلمى بنت القراطيسي, c. C12 CE)
- Safiyya al-Baghdadiyya (Arabic: صفية البغدادية, C12 CE)
- Taqiyya Umm Ali bint Ghaith ibn Ali al-Armanazi (a.k.a. Sitt al-Ni‘m, Arabic: تقية أم علي, 1111-1183/4)
- Shamsa al-Mawsiliyya (Arabic: شَمْسَة المَوْصِلِيّة, C13 CE)

=== Andalus Period (711–1492 CE) ===
- Aziz (court of Al-Hakam I, early C9 CE)
- Hafsa bint Hamdun (Arabic: حفصة بنت حمدون, C10 CE)
- Aa'isha bint Ahmad al-Qurtubiyya (Arabic: عائشة بنت أحمد القر طبية, d. 1010 CE)
- Mariam bint Abu Ya'qub Ashshilbi (Arabic: مريم بنت أبي يعقوب الشَّلْبي, d. 1020 CE)
- Umm al-Kiram bin al-Mu'tasim ibn Sumadih (Arabic: أم الكر ام المعتصم بن صُمادح, d. 1050 CE)
- Umm al-Ala bint Yusuf (Arabic: أم العلاء بنت يوسف, d. 1050 CE)
- Khadija bint Ahmad ibn Kulthum al-Mu'afiri (Arabic: خديجة بنت أحمد بن كُلثوم المُعافرِيّ, C10–11 CE)
- Al-Ghassaniyya al-Bajjaniyya (Arabic: الغسَّانية البجانية, C10–11 CE)
- Qasmuna bint Isma'il (Arabic: قسمونة بنت إسماعيل, C11 CE)
- Wallada bint al-Mustakfi (Arabic: وَلاَّدة بنت المستكفي, d. 1091 CE)
- Umm al-Fath bint Jafar (fl. C11), author of the lost Kitab fi qiyan al-Andalus (The Book of the Qiyan of al-Andalus)
- Suada (fl. C11)
- I'timad Arrumaimikiyya (Arabic: أعتماد الرميكية, b. 1045×47 CE)
- Muhja bint Attayyani al-Qurtubiyya (Arabic: مهجة بنت التيابي القرطبية, d. 1097 CE)
- Nazhun al-Gharnatiyya (Arabic: نز هون الغرْناطية, d. 1100 CE)
- Zaynab al-Mariyya (C11–13 CE)
- Amat al-Aziz (Arabic: أمة العزيز, C12 CE)
- Buthaina bint al-Mu'tamid ibn Abbad (Arabic: بثينة بنت المعتمد بن عباد, 1070–? CE)
- Hind (Arabic: هند, C12 CE)
- Umm al-Hana bint Abdulhaqq ibn Atiyya (Arabic: أم الهناء بنت عبد الحق بن عطية, C12 CE)
- Hafsa bint al-Hajj Arrakuniyya (Arabic: حفصة بنت الحاج الركونية, d. 1190 CE)
- Ashshilbiyya (Arabic: الشلبية, C12 CE)
- Aa'isha al-Iskandraniyya (Arabic: عائشة الإسكندرانية)
- Hamda bint Ziyad (Arabic: حمدة بنت زياد, c. 1204 CE)
- Umm Assa'd bint Isam al-Himyari (Arabic: أم السعد بنت عصام الحميري, d. 1243 CE)

== Anthologies and studies ==
=== Anthologies ===
- Classical Poems by Arab Women: A Bilingual Anthology, ed. and trans. by Abdullah al-Udhari (London: Saqi Books, 1999), ISBN 9780863560477 [includes facing Arabic texts and English translations]
- Dīwān de las poetisas de al-Andalus, ed. by Teresa Garulo (Madrid 1986)
- Poesía femenina hispanoárabe, ed. and trans. by María Jesús Rubiera Mata (Madrid 1990)
- Nisāʾ min al-Andalus, ed. by Aḥmad Khalīl Jumʻah (Damascus: al-Yamāmah lil-Ṭibāʻah wa-al-Nashr wa-al-Tawzīʻ, 2001) [نسـاء من الأندلس, أحمد خليل جمعة].
- Rubiera Máta, María Jesús, Poesía feminina hispanoárabe (Madrid: Castalia, 1989)
- We Wrote in Symbols: Love and Lust by Arab Women Writers, ed. by Selma Dabbagh (London: Saqi Books, 2021), ISBN 9780863563973
- Ibn al-Sāʿī, Consorts of the Caliphs: Women and the Court of Baghdad, ed. and trans. by Shawkat M. Toorawa, Library of Arabic Literature (New York: New York University Press, 2017), ISBN 9781479866793, Arabic text

=== Studies ===
- Hammond, Marlé, Beyond Elegy: Classical Arabic Women's Poetry in Context (Oxford: Oxford University Press, 2010), ISBN 9780197264720
- Myrne, Pernilla, Female Sexuality in the Early Medieval Islamic World: Gender and Sex in Arabic Literature, The Early and Medieval Islamic World (London: I. B. Tauris, 2020) ISBN 9781838605018
