= Muhammad Fanatil al-Hajaya =

Bedouin Poet

Muhammad Fanatil al-Hajaya (Arabic: محمد فناطل الحجايا; born 3 August 1955) is a Bedouin poet from Jordan. He writes poetry on international relations and has published five books of poetry. Hajaya has been loosely attached to Jordan's Hashemite Court and often reads his poetry on national and ceremonial occasions. Though he lived a nomadic desert life as a young man, he now lives in the village of Sadd al-Sultani.

== Life ==
Hajaya was born in Jordan's Karak Governorate. He received a formal education until the age of 10, worked as a shepherd until the age of 15 and served in the Jordanian army.

Throughout his career as a poet, Hajaya has been “loosely attached to the Hashemite Court, where his talents as a vernacular poet have been put to good use on ceremonial and other national occasions." In the early 1990s Hajaya spent “six months in Bahrain as a member of the Bahraini ruler’s personal bodyguard" but "left this post for personal reasons.”

== Poetry ==
Hajaya has published four volumes of poetry, Nafahat Wadi al-'Adhir (I and II), al-‘Azf ‘ala Awtar al-Juruh (2000), li-'Uyunika ya Urdunn al-'Arab (2002). The majority of his poetry is "given over to panegyrics of the Hashemites or the leaders of his own tribe.”

Hajaya's poetic language is more accessible than that of many contemporary Bedouin poets because of its "subject matter and the more 'educated' language that goes with it, though quite a lot of the phraseology, stock metaphors, and compositional elements survive from the older model.” Hajaya writes on poetic topics traditional in Arabic poetry, like love (ghazal), the elegy (ritha') and praise (madh), as well as on topics of international significance, such as the Iran-Iraq War, the Israeli-Palestinian conflict, the US invasion and occupation of Iraq, and the Syrian Civil War.

=== English translations ===
In Politics and Poetry in Contemporary Bedouin Society, Clive Holes and Said Salman Abu Athera translated ten of Hajaya’s poems into English. In Ya Kundaliza Rays! (“Oh Condoleezza Rice!”), published in 2004, Hajaya writes from George W. Bush’s perspective as Bush celebrates the US invasion of Iraq. Also written from the perspective of George W. Bush, Hajaya’s poem Fad‘as wa-Fad‘us (“Fart Arse and Fart Fussy”) lists the “various disasters and public relations debacles that had come to haunt the Bush Administration by mid to late 2004.” Writing from the perspective of an imprisoned Saddam Hussein, Hajaya published ‘Alek Mardud an-Naga (“Declaration of War”) in 2006. Hajaya also wrote I'tidhar lidh-Dhib (“Ode to George”), what the Guardian called a “stirring verse tribute” to George Galloway, the Respect Party MP and “advocate of various Arab causes who has been highly critical of American and British actions in Iraq.” In his poem “Son of the Bedu,” Hajaya “complains about how the Jordanian government discriminates against Bedouin youth.”

Hajaya's recent poems on Muath al-Kasasbeh and the state of the Arab world have been translated by William Tamplin.
