= Ibn Muhriz =

- Born: 7th–8th centuries
- Died: c. 757
- Other names: Abu'l-Khattab Muslim ibn Muhriz, Salm, Abdallah
- Occupations: Musician, Singer
- Known for: Well-known musician and singer of Mecca in Arabia

Abu'l-Khattab Muslim ibn Muhriz (fl. 7th–8th centuries – died c. 757), also called Salm and Abdallah, was a well-known musician and singer of Mecca in Arabia.

Of Persian origin, Ibn Muhriz was a freedman (mawla) of the Banu Abd al-Dar or Banu Makhzum. His father was one of the gatekeepers of the Ka'ba. Ibn Muhriz first studied under Ibn Misdjah and then under Azza al-Mayla. He completed musical education in Iran and Syria. Ibn Muhriz suffered from leprosy, and therefore refrained from appearing much in public. He appears to have been content to have his compositions performed by a slave girl musician. Due to his clinical condition, Ibn Muhriz may have never attended the Umayyad court at Damascus, although a passage written by the 10th-century historian al-Masudi might imply that he was a musician in the retinue of Caliph Al-Walid II (r. 743–744).

== Sources ==
- Ed. (1971). "Ibn Muḥriz". In Lewis, B.; Ménage, V. L.; Pellat, Ch. & Schacht, J. (eds.). The Encyclopaedia of Islam, Second Edition. Volume III: H–Iram. Leiden: E. J. Brill. OCLC 495469525.
- Sawa, George Dimitri (2018). "Ibn Muḥriz". In Fleet, Kate; Krämer, Gudrun; Matringe, Denis; Nawas, John; Rowson, Everett (eds.). Encyclopaedia of Islam (3rd ed.). Brill Online. ISSN 1873-9830.
