= Al-Fari'ah bint Shaddad =

Arabic poet

Al-Fāriʿah bint Shaddād al-Murriyah
- الفارعة بنت شداد
- Writing career
- Language: Arabic
- Period: Pre-Islamic Arabia
- Genre: Rithā'

Al-Fāriʿah bint Shaddād al-Murriyah (Arabic: الفارعة بنت شداد) was a pre-Islamic Arabic poet, noteworthy both for being one of a relatively small number of known Medieval Arabic female poets, and for the famous short marthiyah she composed for her brother Mas‘ūd ibn Shaddād.

== Works ==
Al-Murriyah's marthiyah runs as follows:

O my eye, be generous to Masʿūd son of Shaddād

with every teary gland

whose grief is manifest.

O whoever sees a lightning-flashing cloud

that I have gazed for through the night

pouring profuse rain upon the riverbed‘s
black basalt track.

With it would I water the grave of him I intend,

him whose grave is dear to me

though he were unredeemed.

Attester at councils, erector of edifices,

bracer of banners, burner of dams,

Slitter of camel throats, slayer of tyrants,

alighter on hilltops, breaker of bonds,

Orator of the eloquent, revolter of the ratified,

obstructor of water holes, dispeller of doubt,

Alighter at pasturelands, endurer of hardships,

dispeller of horrors, scaler of heights,

Gatherer of all virtues--as all who knew him knew--

his comrades’ ornament, the tyrant‘s scourge.

O Abū Zurārah, do not be distant!

For every youth will one day be hostage

to stone slab and wooden bier.

O Banū Jarm. did you give your prisoner no drink?

May my soul be your ransom, O Masʿūd,

from a burning thirst!

The thruster of the wide-gashing thrust

that is followed by a profuse gush

after a boiling froth.

Who leaves his opponent with fingertips jaundiced.

and his clothes as if

mulberry-spattered.

The buyer of wineskins for guests

that alight in his courtyard.

to the destitute,

abundant morning rain.
