= Nazhun al-Garnatiya bint al-Qulaiʽiya =

Al-Andalus poet

- نزهون بنت القلاعي الغرناطية
- Born: 12th century Granada, Al-Andalus (modern-day Spain)
- Occupation: Poet
- Writing career
- Language: Arabic

Nazhūn bint al-Qulāʽiya al-Gharnātiya (Arabic: نزهون بنت القلاعي الغرناطية, 12th-century) was a Granadan Qiyan and poet, noted for her outrageous verse.

== Life ==
Little is known about Nazhun's life. Medieval Arabic biographical dictionaries and accounts of her poetry are the main sources. Ibn al-Abbar has her as a (near-)contemporary of the twelfth-century Ḥamda bint Ziyād al-Muaddib. Anecdotes about Nazhun also feature Abu Bakr al-Amā al-Makhzumi as Nazhun's teacher of the arts of satire; he seems to have been alive in the twelfth century, at some point after 1145; indeed, Nazhun 'figures so prominently' in biographical entries about al-Makhzumi that 'his fame seems to be completely intertwined with hers'. She was supposedly the daughter of a qadi (judge).

== Work ==
Although little of her work survives, Nazhun is, among medieval Andalusian women poets, probably second only to her contemporary Hafsa Bint al-Hajj al-Rukuniyya in the quantity of her work preserved: classical sources attribute to her twenty-one lines of verse from seven poems. In addition, the later Ùddat al-jalīs by Àlī ibn Bishrī attributes to her a muwashshaḥa of twenty-five lines, giving her the distinction of being the only female poet in the collection. She usually appears getting the better of male poets and aristocrats around her with her witty invective. In Marla Segol's words, "as a rule, Nazhun represents her body in ways that disrupt conventional strategies for control of women’s speech and sexuality, and protests the merchandising of women’s bodies." The study of her work has been hampered by scholars either not comprehending, or choosing not to expound on, its obscenity and double entendres.

In the translation of A. J. Arberry, one of her various ripostes runs:

The poet al-Kutandi challenged the blind al-Makhzumi to complete the following verses:

If you had eyes to view
The man who speaks with you—

The blind man failed to discover a suitable continuation, but Nazhun, who happened to be present, improvized after this fashion:

However many there may be
All dumbly you’d behold
His anklets’ shining gold.
The rising moon, it seems,
In his bright buttons gleams,
And in his gown, I trow,
There sways a slender bough.

== Editions ==
Modern collections of significant bodies of Nazhun's work include:

- Dīwān de Las Poetisas de Al-Andalus, ed. by Teresa Garulo (Ediciones Hiperión, 1986), pp. 110 ff.
- Nisāʾ min al-Andalus, ed. by Aḥmad Khalīl Jumʻah (Damascus: al-Yamāmah lil-Ṭibāʻah wa-al-Nashr wa-al-Tawzīʻ, 2001), pp. 371–402 [نسـاء من الأندلس, أحمد خليل جمعة].

The following table charts the main early sources on Nazhun and her poetry:

Text type	Editor	Title	Edition/translation
muwashshaḥa anthology	Alī Ibn Bishrī	Uddat al-jalīs	S. M. Stern, 'Muwashshaha li-sh-shd'ira l-Andalusiyya Nazhun' [A muwashshah by the Andalusian poet Nazhun], Majalle-ye 'Ulum-i Isldmiyya [Aligarh] (June 1960), pp. 1–8
muwashshaḥa anthology	Alī Ibn Bishrī	Uddat al-jalīs	Dı̄wān al-Muwashshaḥāt al-Andalusiyya, ed. by S. Ghāzī (Alexandria: Munsha’at al-Ma‘ārif, 1979), pp. 551–52.
muwashshaḥa anthology	Alī Ibn Bishrī	Uddat al-jalīs	Alī Ibn Bishrī, The Ùddat al-jalīs of Àlī ibn Bishrī: An Anthology of Andalusian Arabic Muwashshaḥāt, trans. by Alan Jones (Cambridge: E. J. W. Gibb Memorial, 1992), 360–61.
poetry anthology	Ibn Saʻīd al-Andalūsī (1213–86)	Rāyāt al-mubarrizīn wa-ghāyāt al-mumayyizīn	El libro de las banderas de los campeones, de Ibn Saʿid al-Magribī, ed. by Emilio García Gómez (Madrid: Instituto de Valencia de Don Juan, 1942), p. 60 (chapter 82).
poetry anthology	Ibn Saʻīd al-Andalūsī (1213–86)	Rāyāt al-mubarrizīn wa-ghāyāt al-mumayyizīn	ʻAlī ibn Mūsá Ibn Saʻīd al-Andalūsī Abū al-Hasan (1987). Rāyāt al-mubarrizīn wa-ghāyāt al-mumayyizīn. Tlasdar. pp. 159–61. [علي بن موسى بن سعيد الأندلسي أبو الحسن (1987). محمد رضوان الداية (ed.). رايات المبرزين وغايات المميزين. طلاس للدراسات والترجمة والنشر. pp. 159–61.]
poetry anthology	Ibn Saʻīd al-Andalūsī (1213–86)	Al-Mughrib fī ḥulā l-Maghrib	Ibn Saʿı̄d al-Maghribı̄, Al-Mughrib fı̄ Ḥulā al-Maghrib, ed. Sh. Ḍayf, 2 vols (Cairo: Dār al-Ma‘ārif, 1953–55), I 223–28, II 121.
biographical dictionary	al-Maqqarı̄ (c. 1578–1632), citing Ibn Sa‘īd's Al-Ṭāli‘ al-Sa‘ı̄d fı̄ Tārı̄kh Banı̄ Sa‘ı̄d	Nafḥ al-Ṭı̄b min Ghuṣn al-Andalus al-Raṭı̄b	al-Maqqarı̄, Nafḥ al-Ṭı̄b min Ghuṣn al-Andalus al-Raṭı̄b, ed. by I. ‘Abbās (Beirut: Dār Ṣādir, 1968), I 139, 190-93, IV 295-98
biographical dictionary	Ibn al-Khaṭı̄b (1313-74), citing Ibn Sa‘īd's Al-Ṭāli‘ al-Sa‘ı̄d fı̄ Tārı̄kh Banı̄ Sa‘ı̄d	Al-Iḥāṭa fı̄ Akhbār Gharnāṭa	Ibn al-Khaṭı̄b, Al-Iḥāṭa fı̄ Akhbār Gharnāṭa, ed. Muh‘Aammad ‘Abd Allah ‘Inān, 4 vols (Cairo: Dār al-Ma‘ārif, 1955), I 425-27, 432, II 504-5, III 344-45
biographical dictionary/anthology	Ibn al-Abbar (1199–1260)	Kitāb Tuḥfat al-Qādim	al-Balfı̄qı̄, Al-Muqtaḍab min Kitāb Tuḥfat al-Qādim li Ibn al-Abbār Abı̄ ‘Abdillāh Muḥammad Ibn ‘Abd al-Quḍā‘ı̄ al-Andalusı̄, ed. by I. al-Abyārı̄ (Cairo: al-Maṭba‘a al-Amı̄riyya, 1957), pp. 164-65.
