= Hababa (slave) =

8th-century Arabic singer and poetess

Qiyan Hababah
- Died: c. 724; Beit Ras, Umayyad Caliphate
- Resting place: Beit Ras, (Capitolias) near Irbid
- Occupations: Slave singer and Arabic poetess
- Writing career
- Language: Arabic
- Period: Umayyad Era

Hababah (Arabic: حبابة; d. 724), was a jarya slave singer and poet, concubine of the Caliph Yazid II.

Hababah was a slave, brought to the Umayyad harem of the Caliph Yazid II as a concubine. She was a non-Arab slave, trained in one of the schools for qiyan or singing girls in Medina. Yazid II noticed her during a visit to Hijaz, and his wife Sada bought Hababah as a gift for him for a price of 4,000 dinars.

She entertained him as a singer and a poet. Yazid was so much in love with her that he was described as hypnotized by her singing and poetry.

The chronicles state:

'One day while Hababa was singing, Yazid experienced such great pleasure that he burst out: "I want to fly away!"
Hababa told him: "Commander of the Faithful, if you leave the umma and also us, who will take care of us?'"

Hababah began to have more influence than any other concubine over a Caliph before her. Yazid II delegated some of his state duties to her. He allowed her to receive the complaints of the public in his place, and to appoint officials in his place; one of the governors she appointed was Umar ibn Hubayra al-Fazari, governor of Iraq. The brother of the Caliph, Musallama, complained to him that he left his throne 'vacant'. On one occasions, she contacted the Governor of Medina without the knowledge of the Caliph, and when he was informed, he did nothing to punish her.

She died after choking on pomegranate seeds, (according to another account it was grapes thrown at her by the Caliph) while picnicking in a garden. Yazid initially refused to bury her and was so affected by her death he refused to see anyone for a week. He neglected his duties and died not long after. To his enemies Yazid's great love for her and sorrow at her death resulted in his name coming in disrepute for centuries before he was rehabilitated, and his neglect of state affairs caused Hababah to be considered as an enemy of God.
