= Riddles of Dunash ben Labrat =

900s CE Hebrew riddles

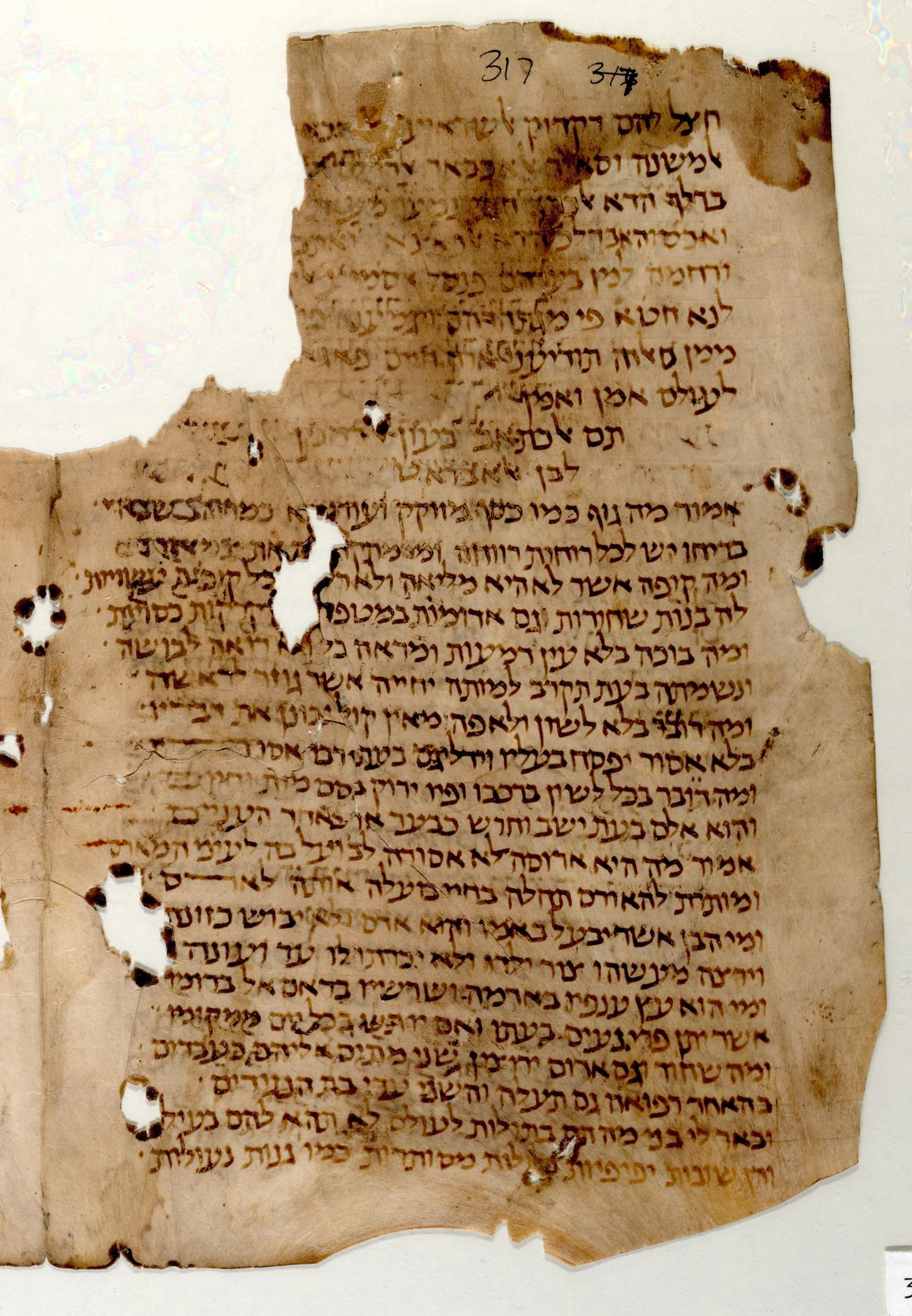
Philadelphia, University of Pennsylvania, Center for Advanced Judaic Studies Library, Cairo Genizah Collection, Halper 317, f. 2v, from the tenth to twelfth century CE. Lines 11ff. contain a twenty-line riddle attributed to Dunash ben Labrat.

The riddles of Dunash ben Labrat (920×925-after 985) are noted as some of the first recorded Hebrew riddles, and part of Dunash's seminal development of Arabic-inspired Andalusian Hebrew poetry. Unlike some later Andalusian Hebrew riddle-writers, Dunash focused his riddles on everyday objects in the material world. His writing draws inspiration from the large corpus of roughly contemporary, poetic Arabic riddles. The riddles are in the wāfir metre.

== Manuscripts ==
Riddles plausibly attributed to Dunash are known to survive in three manuscripts:

- One in Saint Petersburg [presumably in the collections of Abraham Firkovitch in the National Library of Russia]
- New York, Jewish Theological Seminary, Adler, 3702, which includes at least two riddles attributed to Dunash in the Philadelphia fragment.
- A Geniza fragment from between the tenth and twelfth century CE in Philadelphia, University of Pennsylvania, Center for Advanced Judaic Studies Library, Cairo Genizah Collection, Halper 317, f. 2v.

Each manuscript contains some material that overlaps with the others and some unique material. Between them, they contain a total of sixteen riddles that Nehemya Aluny thought could be attributed to Dunash.

== Text ==
The ten riddles that appear in the Philadelphia fragment are characterised by Allony as a single 'poem of twenty lines in the wâfir metre, containing ten riddles', explicitly attributed to Dunash. Carlos del Valle Rodríguez later identified the metre as the similar hajaz.

This poem runs as follows:

Riddle no.	Hebrew text	Spanish translation	English translation of the Spanish	Solutions
1	אֱמוׂר מַה גּוּף כְּמוׂ כֶסֶף מְזֻקָּק וְעוׂד [...]א כמררה ש א[נו] כְּרֵיחוׂ יַשׁ לְכָל רוּחוׂת רְווָחָה וּמֵי מִתְקׂ[ו יְרַו] אֶת צְמְא[וׂנוׂ]	Dimé que cosa es como plata refinada y [sabe] como refrescante ambrosia. Con su aroma un solaz en todas las direcciones se expande. Las aguas de su dulzura irrigan a los sedientos.	Tell me what thing is like refined silver and [tastes] like refreshing ambrosia. With its aroma a solace expands in all directions. The waters of its sweetness [irrigate] the thirsty.	apple
2	וּמַה קּוּפָה אֲשֶׁר לׂא הִיא מְלַיאָה וְלׂא רֵ[יקָה וְ]כָל קוּפוׂת עֲשוּפוׂת עֲשוּיוׂת לָהּ בָּנוׂת שְׁחוׂרוׂת וְגַם אֲדֻוּמּוׂת בְּמִטְפָ[חוׂת יְרַ]קְרַקּוׂת כְּסוּיוׂת	¿Cuál es la cápsula que no está llena ni tampoco va[cía] y todas una misma hechura? Hijas negras tiene y rojas, y recubierta está de caparazón verdeante.	What is the capsule that is neither full nor empty, and all of the same workmanship? It has black and red daughters, and is covered with a green shell.	watermelon
3	וּמַה בּוׂכָה בְּלׂא עַיִן דְּמָעוׂת וּמַרְאָה [כל וְלא] רוׂאָה לבוּשָׁהּ וְנִשְׁמָתָהּ בְּעֵת תִּקְרַב לְמוׂתָהּ יְחַייֶהָ אֲשֶׁר גּוׂזֵר לְרׂאשָׁהּ	¿Quién llora sin que tenga lágrimas en los ojos? Todo lo muestra, pero no ve su vestido. Su ser, cuando se acerca la hora de la muerte, revive, tan pronto se le corta la cabeza.	Who cries without tears in their eyes? She shows everything, but does not see her own clothing. Her existence, when the hour of death approaches, revives as soon as her head is cut off.	wick
4	וּמַה דּוׂבַר בְּלׂא לָשׁׂן וְלׂא פֶה וּמֵאֵין קוׂל [יְ]כוׂנֵן אֶת דְּבָרָיו בְּלׂא אַסוׂר יְפַסֵּחַ בְּעָלָיו וְיַדְלִינֵם בּעֵת [יְ]בּוּ אֲסוּ[רָיו]	¿Quién habla sin tener lengua ni boca ni voz que module sus palabras? Sin ataduras hace cojear a sus dueños y los hace brincar cuando aumenta sus lazos	Who speaks without having a tongue, nor a mouth, nor a voice to modulate its words? Without bonds, it makes its owners limp, and makes them leap when its loops are increased.	pen
5	וּמַה דּוׂבַר בְּכָל לָשׁוׂן בְּרָכְבּוׂ וּפִיו יָרוּק בְּ[סַ]ס מָוֶת וְחַיִים וּמַה דּוׂבַר בְּכָל לשׁוׂן בְּרָכְבּוׂ כְּנַעַר א[וׂ] כְּאַחַד הָעֲנִיִים	¿Quién habla en toda lengua cuando cabalga y su boca escupe el veneno de la muerte o de la vida? Mudo es cuando descanda y sordo, como un ignorante o como un desvalido.	Who speaks in every language when out riding, and his mouth spits the poison of death or life? He is deaf and mute when at rest, like an ignoramus or invalid.	pen
6	אֱמׂר מֶה הִיא אֲרוּסָה לׂא אֲסוּרָה לְבוׂעֵל בֶּהּ לְעֵינֵי הַמְּאָרַס וּמֻתָרֶת לְהָאוׂרֵס תְּחִלָּה בְּחַיֵי בוׂעֲלָהּ אוׂתָהּ לְאָרֵס	Dime cuál es la desposada que no está prohibida a otro varón a los ojos mismos del que la desposó. Está permitida al que la desposó primero y, en vida del marido, puede desposarse de nuevo.	Tell me what is the bride that is not forbidden to another man in the very eyes of the one who married her. She is allowed to the one who married her first and, in the husband's lifetime, can be married again.	earth (Rodríguez), needle (Aluny)
7	וּמִי הַבֵּן אֲשָׁר יִבְעַל בְּאִמּוׂ וְהוּא אַרַס וְלׂא יֵבוׂשׁ כְּזוׂנָה וְיִרְצֶה מַעֲשַׂהוּ צוּר וְלָ[ד]וׂ וְלּא יִכָּרְתוּ לוׂ עַר וְעוׂנָה	¿Quién es el hijo que se casa con su madre, la desposa y no se avergüenza como libertino? Su Hacedor, la Roca, que lo formá, lo tolera, y no lo exterminará ni el maestro ni el discípulo.	Who is the son who marries his mother, weds her and is not ashamed as a libertine? Its Maker, the Rock, who forms it, tolerates it, and neither the teacher nor the disciple will exterminate it.	cockerel (Rodríguez), wisdom (Aluny), farmer ploughing the earth
8	וּמָה הוּא עֵץ עֲנָפָיו בֶּאֲדָמָה וְשֶׁרָשָׁיו בְּרָאָם אֵל בְּרוּמוׂ אֲשֶׁר יִתֵּן פְּרִי נָעִים בְּעִתּוׂ וְאִם יֻתַּשׁ בְּכָל יוׂם מִמְּקוׂמוׂ	¿Cuál es el árbol que tiene las ramas en tierra mientras que sus raices las creó Dios en las alturas? Que da agradables frutos en su tiempo, aunque cada día se desplante de su sitio.	What is the tree that has branches in the earth while its roots were created by God in the heavens? Which bears pleasant fruit in its season, although every day it may be uprooted.	the sun
9	וּמַה שָׁחוׂר וְגַם אָדוׂם יְרוּצוּן שׁנֵי מַתִים אֲלַיהֶם כֵּעֲבָדִים בְּהֶאֶחֶד רְפוּאָה גַם חְּעָלֶה וְהַשֵׁנִי עֲדִי בַּת הַנְּגִידִים	¿Qué cosa negra y qué cosa roja corren y tiene dos muertos como servidores? En el uno está la medicina y el remedio; en el otro, el ornato de las princessas.	What black thing and what red thing run and have two dead things as servants? In the one is medicine and remedy; in the other, the ornamentation of princesses.	day and night
10	וּבָאֵרּ לִי בְּנִי מָה הֵן בְּתוּלוׂת לְעוׂלָם לאׁ תְּהֵא לָהָן בְּעִיל[וׂת] והֵן טוׂבוׂת יְפַיפִיוׂת כְּלוּלוׂת מְסוּתָרוׂת כְּמוׂ גַנּוׂת נְעולוׂת	Explícame, hijo mío, cuáles son las vírgenes que jamás reciben varón. Hermosas tornan, íntegras, cerradas con jardines cercados.	Explain to me, my son, what are the virgins that never receive a man. They return beautiful, undamaged, enclosed with fenced gardens.	artichoke

== Misattributions ==
Some of the riddles which in their earliest witness are attributed to Dunash are found in later manuscripts and editions attributed to other poets. The 1928-29 edition of the works of Solomon ben Gabirol by Hayim Nahman Bialik and Yehoshua Hana Rawnitzki include seven riddles, some of which appear in the Genizah fragment as Dunash's: Genizah riddle 6 appears as Ben Gabirol riddle 1; 7 appears as Ben Gabirol riddle 3; 8 appears as Ben Gabirol riddle 4; 9 appears as Ben Gabirol riddle 5; 10 appears as Ben Gabirol riddle 2.
