= Azza al-Mayla =

Arabic female poet of Umayyad period (died 705)

Azza al-Mayla عزة الميلاء
- Born: Medina, Arabia
- Died: c. 705; Medina, Arabia
- Occupations: Arabic poet, singer, musician, composer and teacher
- Writing career
- Language: Arabic
- Period: Islamic Golden Age (Umayyad era)

Azza al-Mayla (Arabic: عزة الميلاء; lit. 'Azza of the swinging gait') (7th-century - d. 705) was a Medinan Qiyan musician, composer, singer, poet and teacher.

She was a mawla of the Ansar tribe, which mean she was a freedwoman-client who converted to Islam, which was the usual background for free professional musical artists in the Caliphate.

She and her colleague Jamila (d. 720) was one of only two free female musicians known to have managed their own majlis, which was a form of entertainment sessions or salon which was at this time still acceptable for women and men to attend together, as Arabian upper-class women was not yet fully subjected to gender segregation. The majlis played a big role in the lively musical life of Medina, in which the musicians performed and attracted patrons and students. Azza al-Mayla performed in the presence of both women and men, and described by men who admired: 'Azza al-Mayla's beauty, her supple waist and graceful walk, because of which she was called al-Maylii'.

As an artist, she was described as a musician of "great innate musical talent, enhanced by a superb voice and impressive skill in playing musical instruments". She was a student in Arabian songs of the female singers Ra'iqa, Sirin and Zerneb, and a student in Persian airs of Sa'ib Khathir and Nashit, who were known as Persian music performers. She combined old and new music in her art and was referred to as the 'queen of singers'.
