= Al-Karakiya =

13th-century Arab singer and poetess

- الكركية
- Born: Mamluk Sultanate
- Occupations: Poet; musician
- Years active: fl. 1260

Al-Karakiya (Arabic: الكركية; fl. 1260), was a qiyān poetess and musician, active in the early Mamluk Sultanate of Egypt. She was the royal slave concubine of Sultan Baybars (r. 1260–1277).

Al-Karakiya was raised as a child slave of the future Sultan Baybars. Her enslaver gave her the name Al-Karakiya, meaning "Woman of Karak", because he himself had been imprisoned as a boy in the Al-Karak Fortress. During the reign of Baybars, she became active as a qiyan of the Bahri harem. She was a poet and composed music for her poems, and was described in classical Arabic literature as one of the most accomplished slave singers of her time.

In Arabic literature, she is included in Masālik al-abṣār fī mamālik al-amṣār by Ibn Fadlallah al-Umari (1301–1349), the main work describing historical slave singers.
