= Ghada Amer =

Egyptian American artist (born 1963)

- غادة عامر
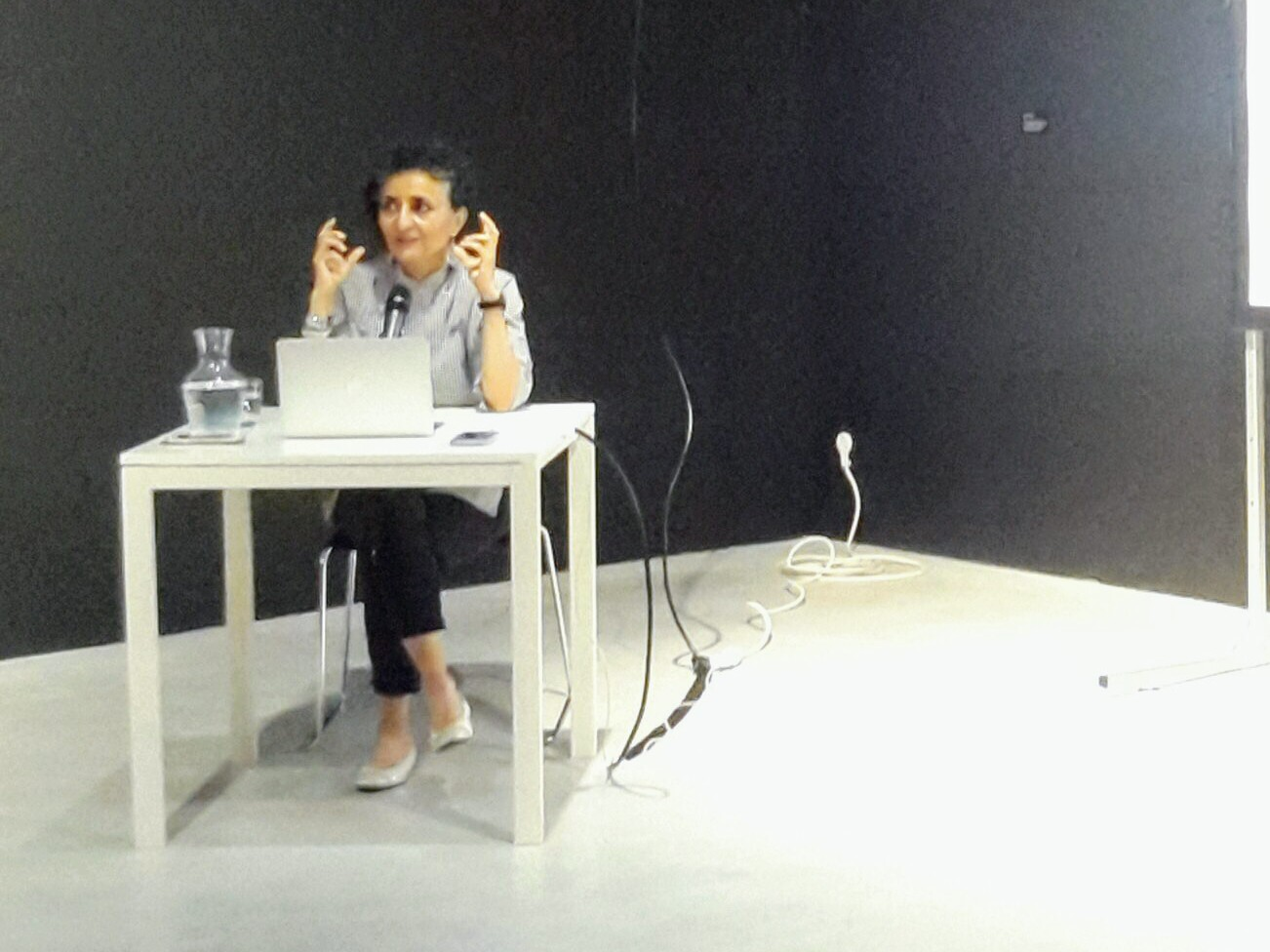
- Ghada Amer at a conference in Tours, France in 2018
- Born: 1963 (age 62–63); Cairo, Egypt
- Education: Villa Arson, Institut des hautes études en arts plastiques
- Known for: Painting, sculpture, installation, performance
- Movement: Hurufiyya movement
- Website: www.ghadaamer.com

Ghada Amer (Arabic: غادة عامر; May 22, 1963, in Cairo, Egypt) is a contemporary artist; much of her work deals with issues of gender and sexuality. Her most well-known work involves layered embroidered paintings of women's bodies, referencing pornographic imagery.

She lives and works in New York City.

== Early life and education ==
Amer was born in Cairo, Egypt. She emigrated from Egypt to France at the age of 11 and was educated in Paris and Nice. Her mother was an agronomist who made business suits for herself. Amer's father, Mohamed Amer, was a diplomat and moved the family many times, not only to France but also to Libya, Morocco, and Algeria. Amer's art practice began as a fascination with romantic postcards and illustrations. Her favored theme remains idyllic images of women in love.

Amer studied at the Villa Arson in Nice, France where she received her Bachelor of Fine Arts in painting in 1986 and her Master of Fine Arts in 1989. She met Iranian artist Reza Farkhondeh while studying in France, and they became friends and later worked together. While receiving her degrees, Amer studied abroad at the School of the Museum of Fine Arts at Tufts in Boston, Massachusetts in 1987. She also studied at Institut des hautes études en arts plastiques. In 1996, Amer and Farkhondeh moved to New York City.

== Work ==
A multimedia artist, Amer is known for her abstract canvases that combine painting with needlework. Her work frequently addresses issues of femininity, sexuality, postcolonial identities, and Islamic culture. She is most famous for her large-scale paintings wherein embroidered images of women in autoerotic poses (traced from porn magazines) are layered over abstract monochromatic drips and washes of acrylic paint.

As a student in the BFA and MFA programs, she was informed that her art school's painting classes were reserved for male students, at which point she became committed to finding her own feminine artistic language with which to speak about women, as a woman. “It was then that, suddenly, I realized I was a woman. I decided to speak about this – and to make painting at the same time. This is what I’m doing. It’s painting with the conscience that I’m a woman.’ Innovative and provocative, she used sewing and embroidery—skills learned from her mother and grandmother and typically associated as "women's work"—as a medium for celebrating and asserting women into the art world. Amer's approach to mediums and subjects from an emphatically female perspective manifest itself throughout her career.

She specifically looks for women who are posing erotically and/or involved in explicit pornographic acts. Once she makes her selection, she traces the women onto Vellum paper with pencil for future use, when she eventually transfers them onto a canvas or uses them as source material for works on paper. Her most prominent and signature formal style is Embroidery, a medium taken up by feminist artist since the 1970s as a political tool. Her work is feminist, subverting the traditionally masculine genre of painting, and its rejection of the norms of female sexuality. Her oeuvre includes examples of painting, drawing, sculpture, performance, and installation. When Amer returned to France from Boston, she became fascinated with Rosemarie Trockel. “She had successfully invented a language for women using knitting, and I liked her use of commercial and political symbols, as well.” Amer's multiple geographic relocations are reflected in her work. Her painting is influenced by the idea of shifting meanings and the appropriation of the languages of abstraction and expressionism. Her work adopts "politically incorrect" imagery for subversive purposes.

=== RFGA ===
Together friends Amer and Reza Farkhondeh collaborated on art drawings and prints, under the name "RFGA" starting in the early 2000s. Amer would create visual explorations of female sexuality, and Farkhondeh would add imagery of forms and the beauty of nature. The collaboration came about after Farkhondeh painted on one of Amer's canvases, she liked his contribution and while it started as a game it later turned into a mutual agreement.

=== Embroidery paintings ===
In 1991, Amer's Cinq Femmes Au Travail embroidery stitching techniques to show women performing tasks that had been advertised for women in magazines—childcare, house cleaning, and cooking. The quadriptych is constructed as neatly stitched line drawings on unprimed canvases. This was a turning point for Amer because by using embroidery and gel on canvas as her medium, she was developing her own feminine language of painting. Cinq Femmes Au Travail begins a series of narrative works that present women performing daily chores or quotidian activities, demonstrating Amer's continued interest in the themes of “bored women” as she characterizes it. In 1993, Amer's interest in the subject of women in domestic imagery ended abruptly. A year later, she began to depict pornographic subject matter, images of naked women in ecstasy or with other women to overthrow ideas of exploitation and objectification that have long been associated with these images. “Sexuality has always been on my mind because one should not forget that I come from a society where sexuality is completely taboo and never mentioned. And since everything forbidden is always desired, I have always been attracted to this notion. Therefore, talking about love in my art implied a very sexual aspect.” In 2000, she continued her work extracting images of women from magazines such as Hustler and Club. In works such as Coleurs Noires and The Slightly Smaller Colored Square Painting she traced and stitched serially masturbating or bound figures and partially covered the erotic images behind tangled threads and gel medium. She explained that "pornography is the starting point of the image, then it becomes something else." Her radical re-imagination of pornography, which comes from a tradition of being made by men for men, show s erotic female desires and fantasies. A second-order transformation in Amer's work, which might be linked with her early interest in the politics and aesthetics of the written and printed text, began with sculptural objects and installations covered with repetitive embroidered texts.

=== Sculpture ===
Although best known for her embroidered canvases, Amer also works with printing, drawing, sculpture and installation. For example, in 2001, Ghada Amer created Encyclopedia of Pleasure, a sculptural installation that features fifty-four boxes, covered in canvas, and embroidered with texts about women beauty and sexuality. The installation shares a name with a twelfth-century Arabic text by Ali Ibn Nasr Al Katib, a literary and medical manual that catalogues sexual pleasure for both men and women that was produced during a progressive period of Islamic culture, but the Encyclopedia of Pleasure is forbidden today. To make the work, Amer selected passages of the text that talk about women sexuality and beauty. She then embroidered a gold thread on fifty-four stacked canvas-covered boxes. Another example of her sculpture is 100 Words of Love. It is a globular, openwork sculpture the structure of which consists of a web of flat, linear, flowing elements that are, in fact, one hundred different words for love in the Arabic language, written also in the Arabic script. It is perhaps appropriate, given that Amer is still at an early stage of exploring the possibilities of her new sculptural language, that 100 Words of Love, Baiser #1 and Baiser #2, and Blue Bra Girls propose different ways in which the manipulation of line, shape, and color can yield an infinite range of compositional and design effects, even within the limitation of globular form. Following well-established feminist art practices of the 1970s, she translated this women's craft into an elite art form that often shares, within the compositional space of the canvas, a fraught optical neighborliness with abstract painterly gestures. The facture and medium of her new sculpture demands a different perspective on this subject, precisely because the casting technique it requires is a traditionally male craft. To be sure, her use of resin, stainless steel, and bronze casting to make these sculptures does not suggest the kind of dramatic intervention in the gendering of the arts that her abstract expressionist gestures did in her canvases a decade ago.

=== Installations ===
She has created public works such as Love Park (1999) in Santa Fe, New Mexico. It is one of her garden projects, a series of outdoor installations she began as an attempt to translate her idea of “women’s work” from embroidery on canvas to an outdoor, sculptural equivalent. For example, Women’s Qualities consists of floral inscriptions in eight flowerbeds on the grounds of the Metropolitan Art Museum. Amer asked people passing by the museum what qualities they would attribute to women. Words like “docile,” “sweet,” “long-lashed,” and “virgin” were a few of the most common adjectives used to describe “women’s qualities.” Following the events of September 11, 2001, Amer's work began to explore the charged topic of Islamic terrorism. Language of Terror (2005) consisted of a bright pink wallpaper adorned with gold crowns and a lattice pattern into which she inscribed numerous definitions of the word terrorism. In the Arabic language, there is no definition of terrorism. She made plates, cups, napkins, and tray liners with the phrase "Terrorism is not indexed in Arabic dictionaries." La Salon Courbé (2007) dealt with similar controversial topics. She installed an elaborately decorated drawing room typically found in elegant homes across Egypt. However, the domestic scene was not as inviting as it seemed. The pattern of the carpet was inscribed with the only Arabic meaning of the word terrorism that Amer could find. Amer's adoption of naked or semi-naked female figures as a recurring pictorial element in her work assumes an ideological and political dimension that is anything but discreet or ambiguous.

Over her career spanning more than twenty years, Amer's work as addressed the subject of women and stereotypes associated with women, as well as the American-Muslim identity. Despite the differences between her Islamic upbringing and Western models of behavior, Amer's work addresses universal problems, such as the oppression of women, which are prevalent in many cultures. “ I was in Cairo in the midst of August [1988] and I was downtown with my mother when I saw a magazine called Venus. It attracted my attention because the cover read: "Special Edition for Veiled Women - month of August." The entire 1980s was a big draw back for women's rights in Egypt. Each summer I was there I witnessed the rising number of veiled women. Women in the street, then my relatives, my aunts, mother, cousins, friends, every women I know was choosing to return to the traditional veil. It was very upsetting,” Ghada states. Amer's work follows a long modernist tradition of critical practices against veiling, which, as Qassem Amin, Huda Sha'rawi, and Duriyah Shafiq argued decades before, represents a most visible symbol of the forces arrayed against women's emancipation. By encouraging women to use their bodies as vehicles of pleasure and instruments of power, Amer allies herself with a brand of gender politics whose very name remains hotly contested. Sometimes referred to as Third Wave Feminism or Postfeminism, or decried as no feminism at all, the wish to reclaim the sexuality of the female body for female pleasure has been gaining currency in Anglo-American gender criticism. Hoping to move past the aesthetic tradition (first identified by Laura Mulvey) in which men are the bearers of the erotic gaze and women merely its object, critics have sought to reintegrate sexuality into the female subject. In the 1990s, Johanna Drucker, Amelia Jones, and Mulvey herself, among others, sought new ways to think about visual pleasure without sacrificing female sexuality. Moving beyond voyeurism to embrace exhibitionism, Amer has said, "I think women like to show their bodies and men like to look at them. [In these works] there is an allusion to masturbation for women, to pleasure." The submission of women to the tyranny of domestic life, the celebration of female sexuality and pleasure, the incomprehensibility of love, the foolishness of war and violence, and an overall quest for formal beauty, constitute the territory that she explores and expresses in her art.

== Exhibitions ==
=== Solo exhibitions ===
Amer's work has been presented in numerous solo exhibitions at such venues as Cheim & Read, New York; Deitch Projects, New York; P.S.1 Contemporary Art Center, New York; the 2000 Gwangju Biennale, South Korea; SITE Santa Fe, New Mexico; the 1999 Venice Biennale; Gagosian Gallery, London; and Gagosian Gallery, Beverly Hills. She is the first Arab artist to have a one-person exhibition at the Tel Aviv Museum of Art.

A detail of her work, Knotty but Nice, was used on the cover of the September 2006 issue of ARTnews magazine, as part of a focus on erotic art. Some more of her solo exhibitions include the 1996 Hanes Art Center, UNC-Chapel Hill, 2001 Ghada Amer: Pleasure, Contemporary Art Museum, Houston, the 2004 Valencia, Spain, and the 2007 Ghada Amer and Reza Farkhondeh: Collaborative Drawings, Kukje Gallery in Seoul.

In 2010 Amer and Farkhondeh showed The Gardens next door at Galeria in Lisbon, Portugal.

Ghada Amer's exhibited at Montreal's Musee d'Art Contemporain in 2012.

Amer exhibited Rainbow Girls at Cheim & Read, New York in 2014 This multi-layered body of work included ornate metal sculptures as well as embroidery on canvas. This body of work drew on calligraphy from Arabic writing to 'modern' typeface woven to create tapestries of 'Rainbow girls' for whom the exhibition is named.

Amer exhibited a collection of ceramic works at the Dallas Contemporary in 2018. The exhibition was titled Ceramics, Knots, Thoughts, Scraps.

Amer has exhibited at Cheim & Read in London in 2018.

Amer's Women I know, Part I was exhibited at the Kewenig Gallery in Berlin, Germany in 2021. This exhibition included ceramic works and portraits of women known to Amer.

Also in 2021, Women's Qualities, a bio art / landscape / ' sculpture park' exhibition was viewed by members of the public at the Sunnylands Center and Gardens in California's Coachella valley.

In 2022, Ghada Amer presented My Body, My Choice at the Goodman Gallery in London. This exhibition immersed the public in Amer's different artistic interests. A garden exhibition nodded to Amer's investment in natural art or bio art and canvases bore embroidered phrases explores the what the artist termed, "a regression of women's rights."

=== Group exhibitions ===
Her group work include New York; the 1997 Johannesburg Biennale, the 2000 Whitney Biennial, the 2006 Without Boundary: Seventeen Ways of Looking, Museum of Modern Art, New York, the 2008 Demons, Yarns and Tales: Tapestry by Contemporary Artists, The Dairy, London, the 2009 Against Exclusion, 3rd Moscow Biennale.

In 2003, Amer's work was included in Looking Both Ways: Art of the Contemporary African Diaspora at The Museum for African Art in Queens. In early 2008, a retrospective of her work, curated by Maura Reilly, was exhibited at the Brooklyn Museum of Art, at the museum's Elizabeth A. Sackler Center for Feminist Art. In the same year, she was featured in Chiara Clemente's documentary "Our City Dreams". In 2014 and 2015, her work was included in the traveling exhibition "The Divine Comedy: Heaven, Purgatory and Hell Revisited by Contemporary African Artists" curated by Simon Njami.

== Recognition and awards ==
2009: Artist-in-Residence, Leroy Nieman Center for Print Studies, Columbia University, New York 2008: Artist-in-Residence, University of North Carolina, Chapel Hill, Artist-in-Residence, Pace Prints Chelsea, New York 2007: Smithsonian Artist Research Fellowship Program, Washington, D.C., Artist-in-Residence, Singapore Tyler Print Institute, Singapore 2005: Artist-in-Residence, H&R Block Artspace at Kansas City Art Institute, Kansas City, Missouri 1999: Artist-in-Residence, School of the Art Institute of Chicago, Chicago, UNESCO Prize, 48th International Art Exhibition, La Biennale di Venezia, Venice, Italy 1997: Pollock-Krasner Foundation Grant, New York> 1996: Artist-in-Residence, University of North Carolina, Chapel Hill

== Public collections ==
- Art Institute of Chicago, Chicago, Illinois, United States
- Birmingham Museum of Art, Birmingham, Alabama, United States
- Centre Pompidou, Paris, France
- Detroit Institute of Arts, Detroit, Michigan, United States
- Fond National d’Art Contemporain (FNAC), Paris, France
- Fonds Régional d’Art Contemporain (FRAC), Auvergne, France
- Fonds Régional d’Art Contemporain (FRAC), Provence-Alpes-Côte d’Azur, France
- Guggenheim Museum, Abu Dhabi, United Arab Ermites (UAE)
- Hood Art Museum, Dartmouth College, Hanover, New Hampshire, United States
- Indianapolis Museum of Art, Indianapolis, Indiana, United States
- Israel Museum, Jerusalem, Israel
- LaM Museum, Lille Métropole Musée d’Art Moderne, d’Art Contemporain et d’Art Brut, Villeneuve d'Ascq, France
- Minneapolis Institute of Art, Minneapolis, Minnesota, United States
- Museum Kunstpalast, Düsseldorf, Germany
- Neuberger Berman Art Collection, New York City, New York, United States
- Sammlung Goetz, Munich, Germany
- Samsung Museum of Art, Seoul, South Korea
- Speed Art Museum, Louisville, Kentucky, United States
- Tel Aviv Museum of Art, Tel Aviv, Israel
- Crystal Bridges Museum of American Art, Bentonville, Arkansas, United States
