= Al-Hujayjah =

Arabic poet

- الحجيجة
- Occupation: Poet
- Writing career
- Language: Arabic

Al-Ḥujayjah (Arabic: الحجيجة), also known as Safīyah bint Thaʻlabah al-Shaybānīyah (Arabic: صفية بنت ثعلبة الشيبانية) was a pre-Islamic poet of the Banū Shaybān tribe, noted for her work in the genre of taḥrīḍ (incitement to vengeance). Her dates of birth and death are unknown, and even her historicity is open to question. But she seems to have granted protection to al-Ḥurqah bint al-Nuʻmān when Khosrow II (r. 590-628) demanded her in marriage from her father al-Nu'man III ibn al-Mundhir around the beginning of the seventh century, and her surviving corpus relates to the Battle of Dhū-Qār in c. 609. Characterised as a 'warrior diplomat', she has been read as a key figure in pre-Islamic poetry.

As with other supposedly pre-Islamic poetry, there has been scholarly debate over whether Al-Ḥujayjah's work might actually have been fabricated later in the medieval period (even if she herself was real). It survives only in Bishr ibn Marwān al-Asadī's collection Ḥarb Banī Shaybān maʻa Kisrá Ānūshirwān (Arabic: حرب بني شيبان مع كسرى آنوشروان), which identifies Al-Ḥujayjah's father as Thaʻlabah al-Shaybānī. It is plausible that the poetry was composed in the Abbasid period to encourage ethnic Arabs to resist the claims for parity of status within the Caliphate by Persian members, known as the Shu'ubiyya movement.

== Works ==
According to Hamad Alajmi, 'Al-Ḥujayjah’s poetry, in general, is similar to other female poets from the pre-Islamic period. Her poems are short and consist of one section as opposed to the standard tripartite pre-Islamic odes ... Her language is pragmatic and lacks metaphorical diction, but is rich in imperative verbs and direct language.'

An example of her poetry, as translated by Alajmi, is this incitement to her people to receive and protect al-Ḥurqah bint al-Nuʻmān:

1. Oh Banū Shaybān, give life to [the tradition] of protecting the neighbor for all
The Arabs have let it die.
2. What is your excuse? When a noble freewoman [al-Ḥurqah] has wrapped herself
In my clothes, [she is] planted in pearls and coral.
3. [She is] the daughter of the kings, the owners of kingdoms and high ranks,
She wears anklets and is the best of Nuʻmān’s [family].
4. Will you urge each other, sharpen your swords,
Straighten your spears,
5. And prepare your soldiers? O my people,
Will you prepare your battle-gear?
6. For I have granted protection to a noble woman from the people of Kisrá ,
[To be protected] by the elders and the youths of our people.
7. Shaybān are my people. Is there another tribe like them?
In combat and the charging of knights?
8. No, by the best of the clans of Rabīʻah.
No one is like them when disasters strike.
9. My people grant protection to the refugee, from his enemy
And they protect my life from life’s misfortunes.
10. The sons of my father arrive at the battlefield not fearing
The attacks of the enemy and the assaults of the opponents.
11. Indeed, I am Ḥujayjah [of the tribe] of Wāʼil, and with Wāʼil,
A man pursued escapes on a mare or a stallion.
12. O people of Shaybān, you have been victorious in the world,
Because of your honor, favor and beneficence.

== Editions ==
- Ḥarb Banī Shaybān maʻa Kisrá Ānūshirwān, ed. by Muḥammad Jāsim Ḥammādī Mashhadānī (Baghdad: s.n., 1988; first publ. Bombay 1887).
- Bashīr Yamūt, Shāʻirāt al-ʻArab fī al-Jāhilīyah wa-al-Islām, ed. ʻAbd al-Qādir Māyū (Ḥalab: Dār al-Qalam al-ʻArabī, 1998), pp. 12-27.
