= Qiyan =

Class of women entertainers in the pre-modern Islamic world

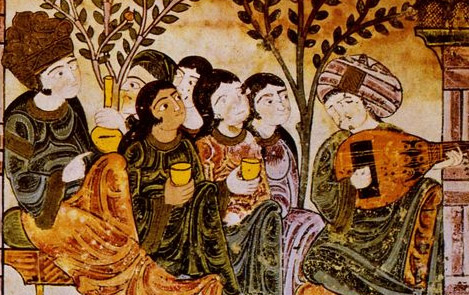
Qayna and musicians in the pre-modern Islamic world

Qiyān (Arabic: قِيان, Arabic: [qi'jæːn]; singular qayna, Arabic: قَينة, Arabic: ['qɑjnæh]) were a social class of women, trained as entertainers, which existed in the pre-modern Islamic world. The term has been used for women who were both free, including some of whom came from nobility, and non-free women. It has been suggested that "the geisha of Japan are perhaps the most comparable form of socially institutionalized female companionship and entertainment for male patrons, although, of course, the differences are also myriad".

Historically, the qiyān flourished under the Umayyad Caliphate, the Abbasid Caliphate, and in Al-Andalus.

== Terminology ==
Qiyān is often rendered in English as 'singing girls' or 'singing slave girls', but these translations do not reflect the fact that qiyān might be of any age, and were skilled entertainers whose training extended well beyond singing, including for example, dancing, composing music and verse, reciting historical or literary anecdotes (akhbar), calligraphy, or shadow play. Other translations include 'courtesan', 'musical concubines', or simply 'women musicians'.

In some sources, qiyān were a subset of jawāri ('female slaves', جَوار; singular jāriya, جارِية), and often more specifically a subset of 'imā' ('slave girls', إِمَاء; singular 'ama, أمة). Qiyān are thus at times referred to as 'imā' shawā'ir ('slave-girl poets', اِماء شَوَاعِر) or as mughanniyāt ('songstresses', مُغَنِّيات; singular mughanniyyah, مغنية). Many qiyān were free women. One of them was even an Abbasid princess, Ulayya bint al-Mahdi.

The term originates as a feminine form of the pre-Islamic term qayn (قين), whose meaning was 'blacksmith, craftsman'. The meaning of qayn extended to include manual labourers generally, and then focused more specifically on people paid for their work, and then more specifically again 'to anyone engaged in an artistic performance for reward'. From here, its feminine form came to have the meaning of a female performer of various arts, in a specific role.

== Characteristics and history ==
Like other enslaved women in the Islamicate world, qiyān were legally sexually available to their owners. They were often associated in literature with licentiousness, and sexuality was an important part of their appeal, but they do not seem to have been sex workers.

However, there were also common qiyān who performed for the public in common qiyān houses; these were brothels in some cases.

It is not clear how early the institution of the qiyān emerged, but qiyān certainly flourished during the Abbasid period. According to Matthew S. Gordon, "it is not yet clear to what extent courtesans graced regional courts and elite households at other points of Islamic history".

Ibrahim al-Mawsili (742–804 CE) is reported to have claimed that his father was the first to train light-skinned, beautiful girls as qiyān, raising their price, whereas previously qiyān had been drawn from among girls viewed as less beautiful, and with darker skin, although it is not certain that these claims were accurate. One social phenomenon that can be seen as a successor to the qiyān is the Egyptian almah, courtesans or female entertainers in medieval Egypt, educated to sing and recite classical poetry and to discourse wittily.

Because of their social prominence, qiyān comprise one of the most richly recorded sections of pre-modern Islamicate female society, particularly female slaves, making them important to the history of slavery in the Muslim world. Moreover, a significant proportion of medieval Arabic female poets whose work survives today were qiyān. For a few qiyān, it is possible to give quite a full biography. Important medieval sources of qiyān include a treatise by al-Jahiz (776–868/869 CE), Abu Tayyib al-Washsha's Kitāb al-Muwashsha (كتاب الموشى 'The Brocaded Book'), and anecdotes included in sources such as the Kitab al-Aghani ('Book of Songs') and al-Imā' al-Shawā'ir ('The Slave Poetesses') by Abu al-Faraj al-Isfahani (897–967 CE), Nisā' al-Khulafā ('The Consorts of the Caliphs') by ibn al-Sāʿī, and al-Mustazraf min Akhbar al-Jawari ('Choice Anecdotes from the Accounts of Concubines') by al-Suyuti (c. 1445–1505 CE). Many of these sources recount the repartee of prominent qiyān, though there are hints that qiyān in less wealthy households were used by their owners to attract gifts. In the Abbasid period, qiyān were often educated in the cities of Basra, Ta'if, and Medina.

== Decline ==
The institution of qiyān declined with the waning fortunes of the Abbasid Caliphate. The initial fracture of the Abbasids did not have immediate impact. The qiyān did not take sides in political disputes. However, political instability led to fiscal mismanagement, and during the Abbasids' heyday, the finances were mismanaged. Further, the new class of Turkish soldiers demanded better pay, leading to the emptying of the treasury; the resulting austerity meant artistic activity could not be funded, and thus flourish, as it had previously. In addition, soldiers extorted money from citizens perceived as rich, which made ostentatious behavior risky.

== Al-Andalus ==
It seems that for the first century or so in al-Andalus, qiyān were brought west after being trained in Medina or Baghdad, or were trained by artists from the East. It seems that by the 11th century, with the collapse of the Caliphate of Córdoba, qiyān tended to be trained in Córdoba rather than imported after training. It seems that while female singers still existed, enslaved ones were no longer found in al-Andalus in the 14th century CE.

Qiyan-slave-girls were initially brought to al-Andalus from Medina, which was first noted during the reign of al-Hakam I (r. 796–822). However, qiyan soon started to be trained in Cordoba and from 1013 in Seville; it is unknown if the tradition was preserved in the [[Emirate of Granada]]. Qiyan-slaves were selected to be trained for this function as children, and underwent a long training to fit the demands. The qiyan-slaves were not secluded from men in harem as free women or slave concubines, but in contrast performed for male guests — sometimes from behind a screen and sometimes visible — and are perhaps the most well documented of all female slaves. While trained qiyan-slaves were sexually available to their enslaver, they were not categorized or sold as concubines and, with their training, were the most expensive female slaves.

== Famous qiyān ==
- Atika bint Shuhda (عاتكة بنت شُهدة c. 800)
- Azza al-Mayla (7th-century - d. 705)
- Inan bint Abdallah (عِنان, d. 841)
- Djamila (جميلة, d. 720)
- Abu al-Husn and His Slave-Girl Tawaddud, a fictional qayna in a medieval Arabic narrative
- Dananir al Barmakiyya (دنانير البرمكية, d. 810s)
- Ulayya bint al-Mahdi, daughter of the caliph Al-Mahdi (d. 825)
- Arib al-Ma'muniyya (عَرِيب المأمونية, CE 797–890)
- Shāriyah (شارِية, c. 815–70 CE)
- Farida (singer) (born c. 830)
- Fadl al-Sha'irah (فضل الشاعرة, d. 871 CE)
- Hababa (حبابة; d. 724)
- Ubayda (fl. c. 830)
- Alam al-Malika (died 1130)
- Nazhun al-Garnatiya bint al-Qulaiʽiya (fl. 12th-century)
- Al-Karakiya (fl. 13th-century)
