= Layla al-Akhyaliyya =

Umayyad Arab poet

- ليلى بنت عبدالله بن شداد بن كعب الأخيليّة
- Born: Before mid-7th century Central Arabian Peninsula
- Died: c. 694–709 CE; Near Samawa
- Occupation: Poet
- Spouse: Sawwar Ibn Awfa al-Qushayri
- Children: Several (names unknown)
- Writing career
- Language: Arabic
- Notable works: Elegies for Tawba ibn Humayyir, Panegyrics for Caliphs Uthman and Abd al-Malik ibn Marwan

Layla bint Abullah ibn Shaddad ibn Ka’b al-Akhyaliyya (Arabic: ليلى بنت عبدالله بن شداد بن كعب الأخيليّة) (d. c. AH 75/694×90/709 CE), or simply Layla al-Akhyaliyya (Arabic: ليلى الأخيليّة) was a famous Umayyad Arabian poet who was renowned for her poetry, eloquence, strong personality, and beauty. Nearly fifty of her short poems survive. They include elegies for her lover Tawba ibn Humayyir, lewd satires she exchanged with al-Nabigha, and panegyrics for the caliphs Uthman and Abd al-Malik ibn Marwan;

== Life ==
She was born to the Banu 'Uqayl section of the Banu 'Amir tribe, coincidentally the same tribe as Qays ibn al-Mullawah and Layla al-Amiriya, the inspiration for the Layla and Majnun genre. However, unlike them, she was a city-dweller and not a bedouin.

In her early years, she was known for her love of Tawba ibn Humayyir, but her father refused the marriage, and she married a man called Abi Al-Athla instead. Tawba continued to visit her despite her marriage until her husband complained to the Caliph, who made Tawba leave. Her husband could not bear the jealousy, so he divorced her. She then married an unknown poet and had many children, little is known about them.

== Poetry and influence ==
Her strong personality and fame gave her access to the courts of the Umayyads and others.

She was one of the few early female Arab poets who dared to speak of her love in public; this poetry is particularly associated with Tawba b. al-Ḥumayyir: 'Laylā and Tawba had fallen in love with each other. But when Tawba asked for Laylā's hand in marriage, her father refused, and married Laylā to another man. Later, Tawba was killed, and this inspired the laments of Laylā'. What made this even more daring was that she was married to another (Sawwār b. Awfā al-Qushayrī). Nevertheless, love poetry was not her only genre, as her poems were diverse in subjects, although she avoided politics. This helped her to continue her relations with politically influential people, despite changing times and powers. Her work includes exchanges of satires with Nābigha al-Ja‘dī (apparently between 40/660 and 63/683) and Ḥumayda bint Nu‘mān ibn Bashīr.

Her poetry was often compared to that of Al-Khansa. However, Layla had more diverse imagery, not confined to the desert, and used more than one genre, not confining herself to one subject. Her poetry also contained some philosophical aspects and wisdom, usually attributed to her extensive travel. On the other hand, Layla depended highly on her poetry for income where she was awarded with money for some poems, and her poetry provided her with connections to rich and powerful people while Al-Khansa depended on her family's traditional pastoralism.

She died in 704 near the city of Samawa in Iraq while traveling.

Example of her poetry:

أحــجاج لا يفـلل سلاحك إنما

المنـايا بكـف الله حيث تراها

إذا هبـط الحجاج أرضاً مريضة

تتبـع أقصـى دائـها فشفـاها

شفاها من الداء العضال الذي بها

غـلام إذا هـز القنـا سقـاها

سقاها دمــاء المارقين وعلـها

إذا جمحت يوماً وخفيـف أذاها

إذا سمـع الحجـاج صوت كتيبة

أعـد لها قبـل النـزول قراها
