= Encyclopedia of Pleasure =

10th-century work of Arabic erotic literature

The Encyclopedia of Pleasure or Jawāmiʿ al-Ladhdhah (Arabic: جوامع اللّذّة) is the earliest existent Arabic erotic work, written in the 10th century by the medieval Arab writer Ali ibn Nasr al-Katib.

The work served as the inspiration for the sculpture made by Ghada Amer in 2001.

== Contents ==
The Encyclopedia of Pleasure quotes and refers to several named and unnamed poets, writers, philosophers and physicians. One of the most famous and more frequently cited writers was Abu Nuwas. Some consider him to be "the father of Arab erotic poetry". It also describes erotic gay and lesbian love.

The book contains an account of a 2nd-century Greek physician, Galen, that was recorded by medieval Arab writers. The physician examined his daughter, who was a lesbian, and concluded that her sexuality was "due to 'an itch between the labia majora and minora' that could be soothed only by rubbing them against another woman's labia".

The author then attempts to find a scientific explanation for lesbianism: "Lesbianism is due to a vapor which, condensed, generates in the labia heat and an itch which only dissolve and become cold through friction and orgasm. When friction and orgasm take place, the heat turns into coldness because the liquid that a woman ejaculates in lesbian intercourse is cold whereas the same liquid that results from sexual union with men is hot. Heat, however, cannot be extinguished by heat; rather, it will increase since it needs to be treated by its opposite. As coldness is repelled by heat, so heat is also repelled by coldness".

One of the stories told in the book is a story about the first Arab lesbian Hind Bint al-Khuss al-Iyadiyyah, known as al-Zarqa', and her love for the Christian woman Hind Bint al-Nu`man, who was the daughter of the last Lakhmid king of Hira in the 7th century. When Hind Bint al-Khuss al-Iyadiyyah died, her faithful lover "cropped her hair, wore black clothes, rejected worldly pleasures, vowed to God that she would lead an ascetic life until she passed away…" She even built a monastery to commemorate her love for al-Zarqa'.

The Arabic version of the medieval text was originally published in Damascus as a part of Adab al-Jins 'Inda al-'Arab ("The Erotic Writings of the Arabs"). It is now difficult to find, and most extant copies are missing the chapters that deal with homosexuality. The omissions make the book difficult for many readers to understand. The English translation of the original Arabic version is much easier to find in Europe than in the Arab world.

== Sculpture ==
Ghada Amer was fascinated with the fact that the Encyclopedia of Pleasure was widely accepted at the time it was written but was later forbidden in the Arab world. She has noted that although the book was written as a moral guide and combined the "literary, philosophical and medical knowledge" of the Islamic Golden Age, it was later "suppressed by conservative society". As Amer puts it:

I was interested in this book because it was written by a Muslim centuries ago, and is forbidden today, according to Muslim law. This shows how open-minded literature was at that time and how centuries later, we are living in a much more conservative time. It is very sad to see that this voice has now been silenced. Why has speaking and reading about sexuality become so taboo in today's Muslim society? I have chosen to trace and then embroider parts of the Encyclopedia on a grid of fifty-seven boxes… Specifically, I am choosing to illustrate parts of the Encyclopedia that speak of women's pleasure…'

In 2001 Amer produced a large sculptural installation inspired by the Encyclopedia. She used an English translation of the book to place the text from the chapters that deal with female pleasure and beauty "On praiseworthy aesthetic qualities of women" and "On the advantages of a non-virgin over a virgin" on "57 canvas boxes, covered with Roman script embroidered in gold thread and stacked in various arrangements." The artist chose to blur some words and even some entire passages. She intentionally did this because she believes that "the text of these passages is not important per se but acts merely as the visual framework for larger investigations of sexuality and spirituality and the role of the word within them."

In her work Amer quoted several sexually explicit texts:

A woman's orgasm comes down from her head whereas a man's comes down from his back. Consequently, the fact that she has less liquid and is slower in ejaculation can be attributed to the fact that the distance between the head and the vulva is longer than that between the back and the penis. Bunyan Dakht was asked which finds greater pleasure in sexual union: a man or woman? And she answered: We, women, find such pleasure in sexual union that when God created…

By using such quotes, Amer demonstrated that in medieval Muslim society the women were not as "sexually repressed" as in the present time, and that their opinions on sexuality mattered.

A team of men and women constructed the sculpture in Egypt.

On 23 March 2007, it was used as a part of Global Feminism exhibit at the Center for Feminist Art at the Brooklyn Museum in New York.

== See also ==
- A Promenade of the Hearts
