= Al-Walid ibn Tarif al-Shaybani =

Khawarij rebel of Harun al-Rashid era

Al-Walid ibn Tarif al-Shaybani الوليد بن طريف الشيباني
- Died: c. 795; Abbasid Caliphate
- Relatives: Layla bint Tarif (sister)
- Criminal charges: Rebellion against State (Treason)
- Penalty: Killed by Abbasid army

Details
- Victims: unknown
- Date: 794 – 795 (few months)
- Killed: unknown

al-Walīd ibn Ṭarīf al-Shaybānī (Arabic: الوليد بن طريف الشيباني) was an eighth-century Kharijite leader. In 794 he launched a rebellion against the Abbasid Caliphate, but was defeated and killed in 795.

== Career ==
Map of the Jazira and surrounding regions

In several sources al-Walid is referred to as a member of the Banu Taghlib, but Abu al-Faraj al-Isfahani and Ibn Khallikan call him a Shaybani, and in the opinion of Clifford Edmund Bosworth the latter identification is the correct one. He was considered a chief of the Kharijites, and reportedly acquired a reputation for audacity and bravery. During his lifetime he usually resided in the area of Nasibin and al-Khabur, in the region of the Jazira.

In 794 al-Walid revolted against the Abbasid caliph Harun al-Rashid and quickly gathered a large number of supporters around him. He soon overran much of the Jazira and killed the governor of Diyar Rabi'a when the latter marched against him, then invaded Diyar Mudar and besieged 'Abd al-Malik ibn Salih in Raqqa. The Kharijites subsequently moved on to Arminiya and besieged Khilat, whose inhabitants agreed to ransom themselves in exchange for their liberty, and proceeded to invade Adharbayjan, Hulwan, the Sawad of Iraq and the districts on the west bank of the Tigris, enriching themselves along the way. They then returned to the Jazira, causing devastation to the province, and gained additional followers for their cause.

In an effort to stop the Kharijites, Harun al-Rashid sent two armies in succession against them, but they were defeated by the rebels and both of their commanders died in combat. The caliph then put Yazid ibn Mazyad al-Shaybani in command of a large army and dispatched him against al-Walid, urging him to bring an end to the insurgency as soon as possible. Yazid met the rebels in battle in late 795, at al-Haditha above Hit, and defeated al-Walid in single combat, killing him and cutting off his head. Yazid also killed a large number of the Kharijites and forced the remainder to disperse, and the revolt ended in defeat.

Al-Walid was elegised after his death by his sister, the warrior and poet Laylā bint Ṭarīf.
