= Jarya =

Term for a female slave in the medieval Islamic world

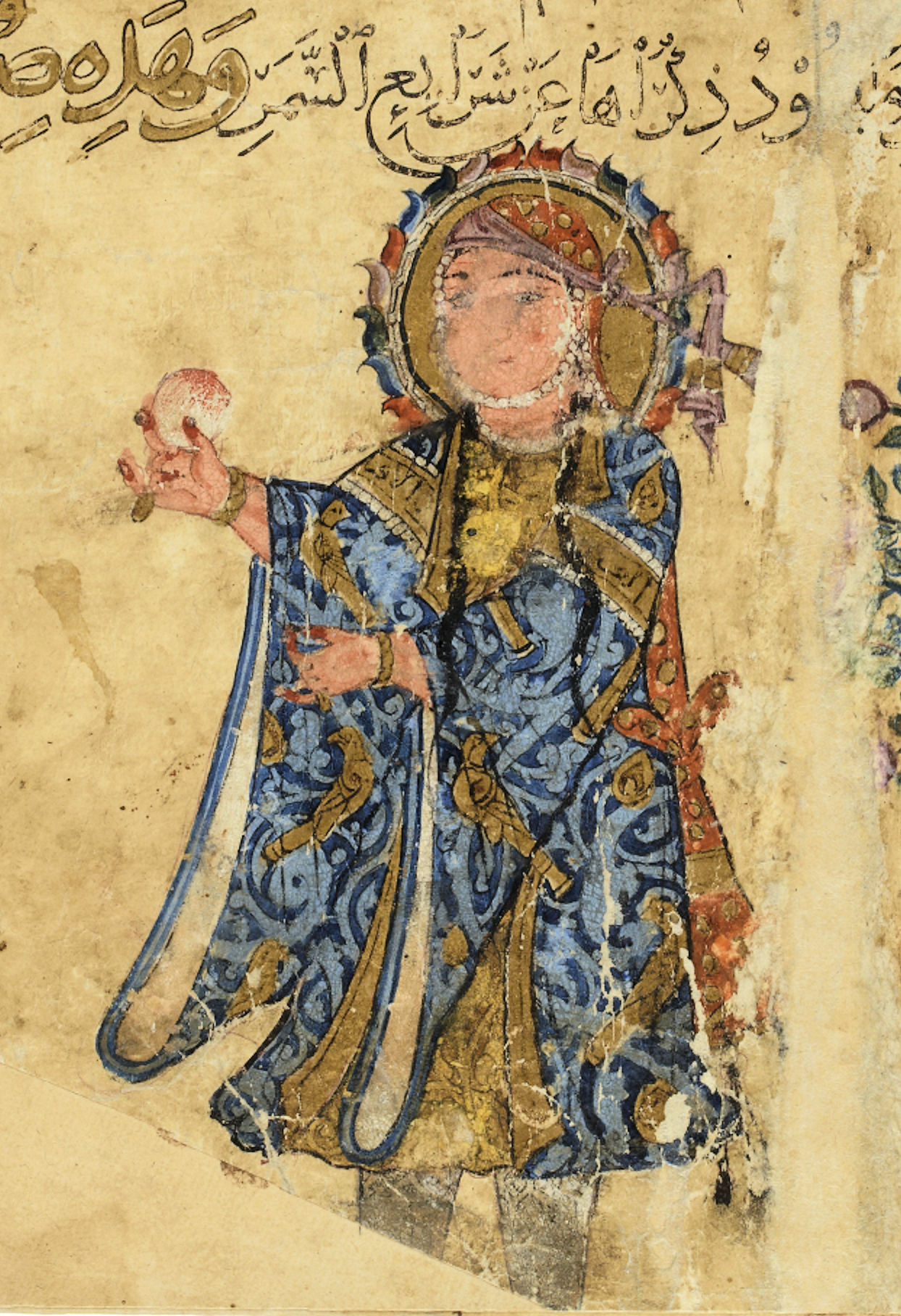
A Jāriya, Maqamat of Al-Hariri, 1200–1210.

Jarya or jariya (sing; Arabic: جارية), also jawari (plur), were female slaves in the medieval Islamic world specifically trained for artistic performance in harems. They contrasted with qiyan, female slaves or free women trained in performance and not restricted to harems.

== History ==
The slave category of the jarya—similar to the qiyan—rose to fame during the Abbasid Caliphate era, possibly because free Arab women became more and more secluded from society during this time period.

They were acquired by purchase or captured as war booty. The term was applied to such enslaved women who, by instruction or self-education, acquired a great knowledge of artistic skills and intellectual knowledge by which they could entertain a man, rather than by sexuality and physical beauty. They could study topics from music and poetry to religion, history and literature, and many were known to be able to entertain their master by both her intellectual and musical prowess. There were many examples of jawari who managed to gain influence over male rulers.

The jawari differed from qiyan in that they appear not to have performed in public, only in the harem to which they belonged. Royal harems could employ a very large number of jawari, who acted as the entertainers of the royal harem and who were not necessarily synonymous with the concubines of the ruler. The Abbasid harem had thousands of jawari as well as concubines who were not always the same, and this distinction was adopted by the harems of many other Islamic rulers, such as the rulers of the Caliphate of Córdoba and the Fatimid Caliphate.

The jariya category of sexual harem slaves was described by the 9th-century writer Al-Jahiz as exerting a destructive influence over their owners with their artistic skills. He claimed that a jariya could hold men in a web of dependent emotions such as love (ḥubb), passion (hawā), affinity (mushākala) and a wish for continued companionship (ilf).

Though most scholarly attention has gone to courtly contexts, jawari were also present in non-courtly urban settings, including the homes of merchants and artisans, notably as domestic workers. A wide range of representations features jawari, including technical treatises and spiritual literature.

== Examples ==
There have been many famous jawari noted in Islamic literature and history, such as Al-Khayzuran, Alam al-Malika, and Hababah.

== See also ==
- Cariye
- Qiyan
