= Humayda bint Nu'man ibn Bashir =

Late 7th-century Arab poet and Tabi'un

Humayda bint Nu'man ibn Bashir حميدة بنت النعمان بن بشير
- Full name: Humayda bint Nu'man ibn Bashir ibn Sa'd al-Ansari
- Died: 700s al-Iraq, Umayyad Caliphate
- Buried: Kufa
- Family: Family of Nu'man ibn Bashir, Banu Khazraj (tribe)
- Spouses: Rawh ibn Zinba (d. 890/92); Al-Hajjaj ibn Yusuf
- Father: Nu'man ibn Bashir
- Occupation: Arab poet

Ḥumayda bint Nuʽmān ibn Bashīr (Arabic: حميدة بنت النعمان بن بشير) was an Arabic-speaking female poet and satirist of the seventh century CE. She is noted for her satires on the failings of her various husbands.

Her father, Nu'man ibn Bashir was born in Medina during the Islamic month of Rabi al-Akhir, which occurred fourteen months after the Hijrah, the migration of the Islamic prophet Muhammad from Mecca to Medina. He belonged to the Banu Khazraj, a major tribe of the Ansar. According to some Muslim authorities, he was the first child of the Ansar to be born after the Hijrah. Her grandfather, Bashir ibn Sa'd, was a distinguished companion of Muhammad, and her grandmother, Amra bint Rawaha, was a sister of another noted Ansari companion, Abd Allah ibn Rawaha.

Al-Hajjaj ibn Yusuf took Umm Aban as his first wife, a daughter of Nu'man onetime governor of Kufa. Before being appointed governor of Iraq, Al-Hajjaj was also wed to another daughter of Nu'man, which was Humayda, after she had been divorced by Rawh ibn Zinba; al-Hajjaj divorced Humayda during his governorship in Iraq. Thus Al-Hajjaj was earlier his brother-in-law and later her husband for a period.
