= Qasmuna =

Iberian Jewish poet (11th-12th cent.)

Qasmuna bint Isma'il
- قسمونة بنت إسماعيل
- Born: 11th or 12th century CE; Al-Andalus (Muslim Iberia)
- Occupation: Poet
- Writing career
- Language: Arabic
- Notable work: Three known poems

Qasmūna bint Ismāʿil (Arabic: قسمونة بنت إسماعيل; fl. 11th or 12th century CE), sometimes called Xemone, was an Iberian Jewish poet. She is the only female Arabic-language Jewish poet attested from al-Andalus, and, along with Sarah of Yemen and the anonymous wife of Dunash ben Labrat, one of few known female Jewish poets throughout the Middle Ages.

== Biography ==
Little is known about Qasmūna's life. Both surviving sources say that her father was Jewish and that he taught her the art of verse. Whereas al-Maqqari calls him Ismāʿil al-Yahudi "the Jew," al-Suyuti calls him Ismāʿil ibn Bagdāla al-Yahudi, and says Qasmūna lived in the 12th century. It has been speculated that Qasmūna's father was Samuel ibn Naghrillah (d. c. 1056), or that Samuel was otherwise an ancestor, which would make Qasmuna an eleventh-century rather than a twelfth-century poet, but the foundations for these claims are shaky.

Three poems by Qasmūna survive, due to being recorded by two later anthologists: al-Suyuti, in his fifteenth-century Nuzhat al-julasāʼ fī ashʻār al-nisā, an anthology of women's verse, and Ahmad al-Maqqari, in his seventeenth-century Nafḥ al-ṭīb. Al-Suyuti, and conceivably also al-Maqqari, seems to have derived the material from an earlier anthology of Andalusian verse, the Kitāb al-Maghrib by ibn Sa'id al-Maghribi; but it seems that the verses do not appear in surviving manuscripts of that work.

== Works ==
Three poems by Qasmūna are known.

=== 1 ===
One is part of a verse-capping challenge set by Qasmūna's father. As edited and translated by Nichols, he begins:

Lī ṣāḥibun dhū [lacuna] qad qābalat
nafʿan bi-ḍurrin wa-staḥallat ḥarāma-ha.

Translation:

I have a friend whose [lacuna] has repaid good with evil,
considering lawful that which is forbidden to her.

To which Qasmūna replies:

Ka-shshamsi min-ha-l-badru yaqbisu nūra-hu
abadan wa-yaksifu baʿda dhālika jirma-ha.

Translation:

Just like the sun, from which the moon derives its light
always, yet afterward eclipses the sun's body.

The missing word in this verse is assumed to be a word denoting a woman of some kind.

=== 2 ===
The most famous of Qasmūna's poems, widely anthologised, is introduced by the comment that she looked in the mirror one day and saw that she was beautiful and had reached the time of marriage. She then utters this verse:

Ayā rawḍatan qad ḥāna min-ha qaṭāfu-ha
wa-laisa yurâ ḥānin yamudda la-ha yadā;
fa-wā asafī yamdī-shshabābu mudayyaʿan
wa-yabqâ-lladhī mā lanʾusammī-hi mufradā.

Translation:

I see an orchard
Where the time has come
For harvesting,
But I do not see
A gardener reaching out a hand
Towards its fruits.
Youth goes, vanishing; I wait alone
For somebody I do not wish to name.

=== 3 ===
The last of Qasmūna's known poems runs:

Yā ẓabyatan tarʿa bi-rawdin dāʾiman
innī ḥakaitu-ki fi-ttawaḥḥushi wa-l-ḥawari.
Amsâ kilā-nā mufradan ʿan ṣāḥibin
fa-ʿitābu-nā abadan ʿalâ ḥukmi-l-qadari.

Translation:

Always grazing
here in this garden--
I'm dark-eyed just
like you, and lonely.
We both live far
from friends, forsaken --
patiently bearing
our fate's decree.
