= Mahd al-Aadiyya =

Arabic poet c. 4000 BCE

- Born: c. 4000 BCE
- Occupation: Poet
- Writing career
- Language: Arabic

Mahd al-Aadiyya (Arabic: مَهد العادية) was supposedly an Arab poet from around 4000 BCE. She is unlikely to have existed: Rather she is a chronicle character who is portrayed uttering the earliest example of a muzdawaj (heroic couplet) form warning the people of ʿĀd of their impending destruction by Allah, in accordance with the prophecies of the prophet Hud.

== Anthologies ==
Classical Poems by Arab Women; translated by Abdullah al-Udhari, Saqi Books, 1999. ISBN 086356-096-2
