= Sarah of Yemen =

Sarah of Yemen (Arabic: سارة, fl. 6th century) is noted as one of the small number of female composers of pre-Islamic Arabic poetry known from the sixth century. It is possible that she was Jewish, in which case she is one of only three attested female medieval Jewish poets (the others being the anonymous, tenth-century wife of Dunash ben Labrat and the probably twelfth-century Qasmuna).

The poem attributed to her survives in the tenth-century anthology named Kitab al-Aghani:

بنفسي أُمّةٌ لم تُفْنِ شبِأً\\بذي حُرُضٍ تَعقّبُها الرِياحُ
كُهولٌ من قُرَيْظةَ اتلفتْها\\سيوفُ الخَزْرَجيِّة والرماح
رُزدنا والرزيئةُ ذاتُ ثِقْلٍ\\بَمُرّ لاملِها املاءُ القَراح
ولو أَربوا بامرهمِ لجالت\\هنالك دونهم جَأوا رَداح

Translation:

By my life, there is a people not long in Dhu Ḥurud, obliterated by the wind.
Men of Qurayza destroyed by Khazraji swords and lances,
We have lost, and our loss is so grave, it embitters for its people the pure water.
And had they been foreseeing, a teeming host would have reached there before them.

The eulogy implies that Sarah was a member of the Banu Qurayza, commenting on their defeat by Muslims around 627. Little more is known about Sarah, but she 'reputedly participated in a guerrilla action against Muhammad before a Muslim agent killed her.'
