= Al-Hurqah =

Pre-Islamic Arab poet

Hind bint al-Nuʿmān
- هند بنت النعمان
- Occupation: Poet
- Father: Al-Nu'man III ibn al-Mundhir

Hind bint al-Nuʿmān (Arabic: هند بنت النعمان), also known as al-Ḥurqah, was a pre-Islamic Arab Nestorian Christian poet. There is some historiographical debate, going back to the Middle Ages, over precisely what her names were, with corresponding debates over whether some of the bearers of these names were different people or not. An example of a poet-princess, she has been read as a key figure in pre-Islamic poetry.

== Biography ==
Hind was the daughter of al-Nu'man III ibn al-Mundhir, the last Lakhmid king of al-Hira (r. 582 – c. 602) and an Eastern Christian Arab mother. According to the Ḥarb Banī Shaybān maʻa Kisrà Ānūshirwān, Khosrow II, emperor of the Sasanian Empire (r. 590–628) and her father's overlord, demanded Hind in marriage. Thinking better of the arrangement, al-Nuʿmān sent Hind to seek refuge among the Arabs, and was subsequently attacked and imprisoned by Khosrow. After failing to find sanctuary with the Ghassanids and other Arab tribes, Hind was granted sanctuary among the Banu Shayban through the intercession of their princess al-Ḥujayjah. It was supposedly for this reason that the Banu Shayban had to fight the Battle of Dhi Qar in c. 609. She was then sent to marry al-Nu'man ibn al-Rayyan, "her only cousin to survive the Persian attack on the Kingdom of al-Ḥirah", after which Khosrow granted him the throne of al-Hirah.

Ali ibn Nasr al-Katib's Encyclopedia of Pleasure tells that Hind loved a woman named Hind bint al-Khuss al-Zarqāʾ. When al-Zarqāʾ died, her faithful lover "cropped her hair, wore black clothes, rejected worldly pleasures, vowed to God that she would lead an ascetic life until she passed away". Hind bint al-Nuʿmān even built a monastery to commemorate her love for al-Zarqāʾ. This source figures the two characters as the first lesbians in Arab culture.

== Works ==
Some poetry is attributed to Hind, making her (if the attributions are correct) a relatively rare example of a pre-Islamic female poet whose work survives.

== Other sources ==
Hind is the main figure in the One Thousand and One Nights-Story ‘Adî ibn Zayd and the Princess Hind.

== Literature ==
- Sindawi, Khalid (2022). Pre-Islamic Arab Christian Poetesses: The Biography and Poetry of Hind bint al-Nuʿmān (The Nun of Grief, and the Princess of al-Ḥuraqa). AL-Majma, (17), 63–112.
