= Layla bint Tarif =

Arab poet and Kharijite female warrior (d. 815)

- لَيلْى بنت طريف
- Born: Layla bint Tarif
- Died: 815 CE
- Occupations: Poet, Warrior
- Relatives: Al-Walid ibn Tarif (brother)
- Writing career
- Language: Arabic
- Period: Medieval
- Genre: Elegy
- Notable work: Elegy for her brother al-Walid ibn Tarif

Laylā bint Ṭarīf (Arabic: لَيلْى بنت طريف, d. 815 CE) was a female warrior and poet and one of the Khawarij, a group known for its members' violent opposition to the established Caliphate, believing that leadership of the Muslim community was not limited to male Arabs of the Quraysh tribe. On the basis of women fighting alongside Muhammad, the Khawarij have viewed combat as a requirement for women, and Laylā bint Ṭarīf is a prominent example of this custom. Laylā was the sister of the Kharijite leader al-Walid ibn Tarif al-Shaybani (d. 795). After al-Walīd's death, Laylā took on the leadership of his army and fought two battles before her clan forced her to step down.

== Sample ==
As translated by Abdullah al-Udhari, Laylā's elegy for her fallen brother runs:

On the hill of Nubatha stood a tomb tall as the tallest mountain, whose guest was a generous soul with an unbent will and a perceptive mind.

He was a young man who led a clean life and his wealth was earned by sword and spear.
We miss him like the spring, I wish we could have ransomed him with thousands of our nobles.
Elder tree, you're still wearing your leaves, don't you miss Ibn Tarif?

May Allah shower him with His Salaams, for no lord escapes his fate.

Her work shows some influence from the earlier woman poet al-Khansa.
