= Al-Gassaniyya =

Al-Gassaniyya (c. 10th or 11th century) was an Andalusian adība (woman of letters) and poet from Bayyāna, present-day Pechina, Almería, Spain.

Few details remain in the historic record about this Arab poet; her surname, the last remnant of her identity, indicates she belonged to the Gassān clan and was from Bayyāna. She lived perhaps during the height of economic and cultural splendor in Taifa of Almería, coinciding with the reigns of Jairán and Abu Yahya Muhammad al-Mutasim. This would have made her a contemporary of Zaynab al-Mariyya, another Almerian woman poet.

She is known for writing panegyrics dedicated to the kings.

Only six lines written by al-Gassaniyya have survived: part of a romantic prelude to a likely much longer qasida about Jairán, the king of Almeria, that emulates the work of the famous court poet Ibn Darraj al-Qastalli:

Did it sadden you to hear them say:
"The palanquins of the women have departed"?
How could you bear it, woe is you,
when they left?
There are but only deaths on their departure,
and if not, a resignation.
