= Inan bint Abdallah =

Arab female poet of Abbasid period

Inan bint Abdallah عنان بنت عبد الله
- Died: c. 810 or 841; Iraq
- Resting place: Iraq
- Occupation: Arabic Poet
- Writing career
- Pen name: Inan
- Language: Arabic
- Period: Islamic Golden Age (Abbasid era)

ʽInān bint ʽAbdallāh (Arabic: عنان بنت عبد الله, died 841) was a prominent poet and qiyan of the Abbasid period, even characterised by the tenth-century historian Abū al-Faraj al-Iṣfahāni as the slave-woman poet of foremost significance in the Arabic tradition. She was later the concubine of Harun al-Rashid.

== Biography ==
ʽInān was born a muwallada (daughter of an Arab father and slave mother) to ʽAbd-Allāh. To her appearance, she was described as a Blonde. She was trained in Yamamah. She was sold to Abū Khālid al-Nāṭifī, who brought her to Baghdad.

In the assessment of Fuad Matthew Caswell,

Her salon at the house of al-Nāṭifī was frequented by the celebrated poets and men of letters of the time, including Abū Nuwās, Diʽbil al-Khuzāʽī, Marwān b. Abī Ḥafṣa, al-ʽAbbās b. al-Aḥnaf and al-Ma’mūn's tutor al-Yazīdī al-Ḥimyarī, among a host of others, one of the attractions being that her master was devoid of jealously and tolerated the ease with which she bestowed her favours.

ʽInān's fame led Caliph Hārūn al-Rashīd to seek to buy her to include her in the Abbasid harem, but he refused al-Nāṭifī's asking price of 100,000 dīnārs. However, on al-Nāṭifī's death, al-Rashīd had ʽInān put up for auction, ostensibly to help clear al-Nāṭifī's debts. Via an agent, al-Rashīd then acquired her for 225,000 dirhams (in that time 1 dinar was equal to 7 dirhams). As al-Rashīd's concubine, ʽInān bore him two sons, both of whom died young. She accompanied him to Khurāsān where he, and, soon after, she died.

== Work ==
ʽInān was noted for her rapier-like repartee, which was often sexual or even vulgar in tone, and this will have been an important aspect of her fame/infamy. A large part of her surviving corpus comprises her responses to male poets' challenges in verse-capping contests. A significant proportion of her surviving verse is dialogue with the famed poet Abū Nuwās.

== Example ==
As rendered by Eric Ormsby, one of the virtuosic yet obscene exchanges between ʽInān and Abū Nuwās runs thus:

One day she asked him whether he was any good at scansion; when Abu Nuwas replied boastfully that he was superb at it, she said, "Try scanning this verse:

I ate Syrian mustard on a baker's platter...
(akaltu ʽl-khardalah sh-shā’mi fī ṣafḥati khabbāzī...)

Abu Nuwas broke the line into metrical feet and responded:

Akaltu ʽl-khar...ti-tum ti-tum

which means:

I ate some shit ti-tum ti-tum...

The assembled courtiers broke into loud laughter at the poet's expense. Not to be outdone, he asked ʽInān whether she could scan the following (rather nonsensical) verse:

Keep your church far from us, O sons of the wood-carrier...!
(ḥawwilū ʽannā kanīsatakum yā banī ḥammālati l-ḥaṭabi...)

She too had to break up the metrical feet to produce:

ḥawwilū ʽan tum-ti tum-ti nākanī....

which comes out as

Keep away tum-ti-tum-ti he has fucked me...

== Editions and translations ==
- Ibn al-Sāʽī, Consorts of the Caliphs: Women and the Court of Baghdad, ed. by Shawkat M. Toorawa, trans. by the Editors of the Library of Arabic Literature (New York: New York University Press, 2015), pp. 11–19 (edition and translation of one medieval anthology)
- Fuad Matthew Caswell, The Slave Girls of Baghdad: The 'Qiyān' in the Early Abbasid Era (London: I. B. Tauris, 2011), pp. 56–81 (extensive quotation of translated poems)
