= Dunash ben Labrat =

10th-century Moroccan Jewish poet and grammarian

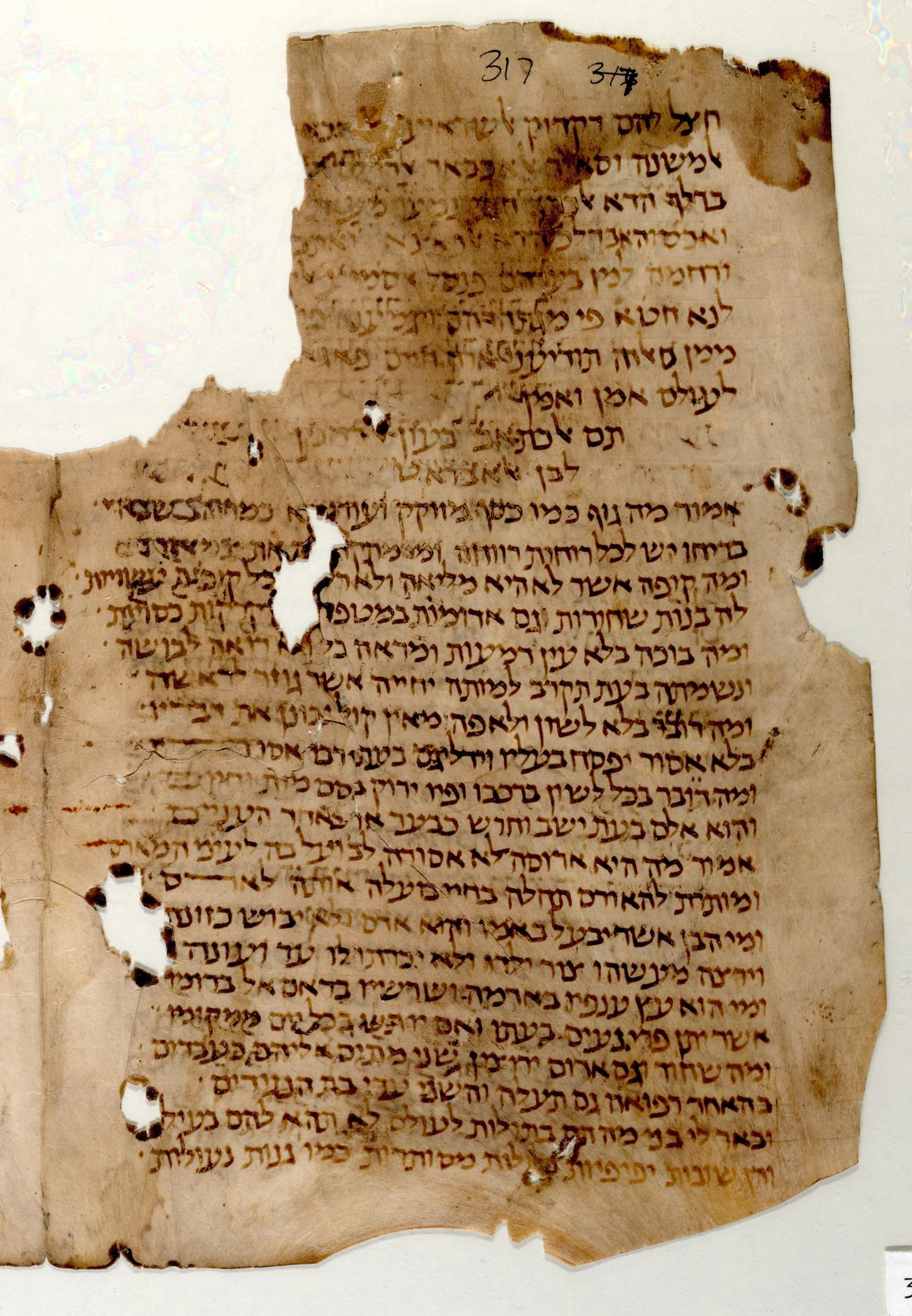
Philadelphia, University of Pennsylvania, Center for Advanced Judaic Studies Library, Cairo Genizah Collection, Halper 317, f. 2v, from the tenth to twelfth century CE. Lines 21ff. contain a twenty-line riddle attributed to Dunash ben Labrat.

Dunash ha-Levi ben Labrat (920 – 990) (Hebrew: ר׳ דוֹנָש הַלֵּוִי בֵּן לָבְּרָט; Arabic: دناش بن لبراط) was a medieval Jewish commentator, poet, and grammarian of the Golden age of Jewish culture in Spain. He is known for his philological commentary, Teshuvot Dunash, and for his liturgical poems D'ror Yiqra and D'vai Haser.

== Life ==
Dunash was, according to Moses ibn Ezra, born in Fes, the name Dunash being of Berber origin. In his youth he travelled to Baghdad to study with Saadia Gaon. On returning to Morocco he wrote many poems and became famous, and there were even poems written about him. He taught grammar and poetry.

Hasdai ibn Shaprut, who lived in Córdoba, invited Dunash to Spain. Córdoba was then the center of culture and poetry in the Islamic world, and Hasdai endeavored to bring the best minds there. In Córdoba, Dunash met Menahem ben Saruq, also an important grammarian, though the two did not get along because of their many grammatical disputes as well as Menahem's tough criticism of Saadia Gaon, Dunash's mentor. Their dispute turned into personal rivalry, which included many polemic compositions and exchanges of accusations to Hasdai ibn Shaprut.

Dunash died in Córdoba in 990.

== Work ==
Dunash is called the founder of Andalusian Hebrew poetry. He first introduced Arabic meter into Hebrew poetry. Traditional Arabic poetry was built on patterns of long and short syllables. Dunash's innovation came in drawing a parallel between the šəwâ (ə) and ḥāṭēp̄ (ĕ/ă/ŏ) and the Arabic short vowels (i/a/u), so as to create a new Hebrew meter. This meter formed the basis for all subsequent medieval Hebrew poetry. At the time, however, it opened him up to severe criticism, particularly among the students of Menahem ben Saruq, that he was corrupting the Hebrew language by introducing Arabic forms, and changing traditional Biblical styles to conform to Arabic meter and rhyming schemes. For instance, in his classic poem D'ror Yikra, he begins the second line: Ne'im shim'chem ("pleasant [is] your name"), with a modified form of the adjective "pleasant," which properly should be na'im.

This body of poetry includes the riddles of Dunash ben Labrat, among the first known Hebrew riddles.

In the field of grammar, Dunash's major work was a book attacking Menahem ben Saruq and his Mahberet ("Notebook") for violating religious standards and opposing the teachings of the sages. He dedicated his work to the leader of the Jews of Spain at the time, Hasdai ibn Shaprut. In his book, he was the first Hebrew grammarian to distinguish between transitive and intransitive verbs, the first to list verbs by their three-letter roots in the Paal construction, and the first to distinguish between "light" and "heavy" roots. He also condemned Menahem ben Saruq for failing to see the relationship between Hebrew and Arabic. Dunash also wrote a book containing two hundred reservations about the teachings of his old mentor, Saadia Gaon.

The students of Menahem ben Saruq responded with a scathing attack on Dunash, condemning him for using Arabic meter and grammar in studying the Hebrew language, as well as on issues of Jewish philosophy about which they were at odds. Rabbi Abraham Ibn Ezra also wrote a response to Dunash's work, in defense of Saadia Gaon. These challenges were met by Yehudi ben Sheshet, one of Dunash's students, who wrote a work in defense of his master that strongly opposed all of his detractors.

The debates between Dunash and others were finally decided in the centuries after his death by Rabbeinu Tam, a grandson of Rashi, who attempted to judge between the two schools of thought, and by Rabbi Joseph Kimhi, father of the noted grammarian Rabbi David Kimhi (RaDaK), who supported Dunash's positions. Nevertheless, many of the issues raised by Dunash have yet to be resolved today. Dunash is remembered as a poet and a grammarian who uncovered many of the major problems of Hebrew grammar.

== Poetry of Dunash's wife ==
Though her name is unknown, Dunash's wife is held to be the author of a poem on the subject of Dunash's exile. This makes it the only known medieval Hebrew verse by a woman (and the only known medieval verse by a Jewish woman apart from those of Qasmuna and, if she was Jewish, Sarah of Yemen). Giving both verse and prose translations, it reads:

Hebrew

הֲיִזכוׂר יֵעֲלַת הַחֵן יְדִידָהּ
בְּיוׂם פֵּירוּד וּבִזְרוׂעָהּ יְחִידָהּ
וְשָׂם חוׂתַם יְמִינוֹ עַל שְׂמׂאלָהּ
וּבִזְרוׂעוׂ הֲלאׁ שָׂמָה צְמְידָהּ
בְּיוֹם לָקַחָה לְזִכָּרוׂן רְדִידוׂ
וְהוּא לָקֵח לְזִכָּרוׂן רְדִידָהּ
הֲיִשָׁאֵר בְּכָל אֶרֶץ סְפָרַד
וְלוּ לָקַח חֲצִי מַלְכוּת נְגִידָהּ

Transliteration

Ha-yizkor ya‘alat ha-ḥen yedidah
be-yom perud u-vi-zero‘ah yeḥidah
Ve-sam ḥotam yemino ‘al-semolah
u-vi-zero‘o ha-lo’ samah ẓemidah
Be-yom laqḥah le-zikaron redido
ve-hu’ laqaḥ le-zikaron redidah
Ha-yishsha’er behol ereẓ sefarad
ve-lu laqaḥ ḥaẓi malhut negidah?

Translations

Will her love remember his graceful doe,
her only son in her arms as he parted?
On her left hand he placed a ring from his right,
on his wrist she placed her bracelet.
As a keepsake she took his mantle from him,
and he in turn took hers from her.
Would he settle, now, in the land of Spain,
if its prince gave him half his kingdom? (Note: Another translation reads: "Will her beloved remember the elegant doe, her only son in her arms at the moment of his departure? On the day he placed the signet ring from his right hand on her left and she placed her bracelet on his arm, she took his cloak as a memento and he took her cloak as a memento. If he could hold half the prince’s kingdom, is there anywhere in Sefarad he would remain?")

An incomplete text of the poem was discovered and published in the 1940s in two fragments from one eleventh-century manuscript, Mosseri IV.387 and Mosseri VIII.202.2. At that time, the poem was assumed to be by Dunash. But a manuscript declaring the poem to be by Dunash's wife came to light in the 1980s, in the form of a probably eleventh-century fragment from the Cairo Geniza (where it is now catalogued as Cambridge, Cambridge University Library, T-S NS 143.46), and first edited by Ezra Fleischer. This manuscript includes an incomplete reply from Dunash to his wife:

Were you seeking the day of my death when you wrote:
"Have you betrayed and abandoned your vows?"
Could I betray a woman so wise
given by God as the bride of my youth?
Had my heart ever thought to leave you
I would have torn it into pieces.
For those who betray their beloved companion,
God brings down with the trials of foes.
Lions soon will devour his flesh,
and vultures will consume his blood.
Who resembles the stars of dawn [...]

The circumstances of this separation are unclear; it is thought that Dunash's wife composed her poem shortly after Dunash's departure, around 950. A further poem, found in 1985 written on the corner of a letter composed by Hasdai ibn Shaprut (T-S J2.71, f. 2v), identified as being a complaint from Dunash about his service under Hasdai, seems further to describe his feelings on leaving his wife. Following two illegible lines, the text reads:

Hebrew original

בּֽיָגוׄן לְעָבֽדֽךָ כִּי אִם סֽחוׂרַת יָד [גּֽ]אוּלָה
בִּתבוּאוׄת ל̇א אֲעוׄלֵל וֽל̇̇א אֶקְטוׄף מְלֽילָה
בָּגַדֽתִּי בְּאֵ̇שֶת נְעוּרִים סֵפֶר כּֽרִיתוּת לֽ̇שַלְּ[חָ]ה
נָטַ̇שְתִּי נַחֲלָתִי וְעָזַבֽתִּי בְנִי אֲ̇שֶר יָלְדָה

translation

I served you in sorrow, for all your wares are loathsome.
I will glean no grapes, nor will I gather corn.
I betrayed a young wife and sent her a writ of divorce.
I left my home, and abandoned the son that she bore.

== Editions and translations ==
=== Poetry ===
- Aluny, Nehemya (ed.), 'Ten Dunash Ben Labrat's Riddles', The Jewish Quarterly Review, New Series, 36 (1945), 141-46.
- Cole, Peter (trans.), The Dream of the Poem: Hebrew poetry from Muslim and Christian Spain, 950-1492 (Princeton: Princeton University Press, 2007), p. 23-27 ("Dunash Ben Labrat" and "The wife of Dunash").
- Del Valle Rodríguez, Carlos (trans.), El diván poético de Dunash ben Labraṭ: la introducción de la métrica árabe (Madrid: Consejo Superior de Investigciones Cinetí cas, 1988).

=== Shirim ===
- Allony, Nehemiah (ed.), Dunash ben Labraṭ: Shirim (Jerusalem: Mosad Harav Kook, 1947).

=== Teshuvot ===
- Filipowski, H. (ed.), Teshuvot Dunash ben Labraṭ (London and Edinburgh: Meorere Yeshenim, 1855).
- Sáenz-Badillos, Angel (ed. and trans.), Tešuḇot de Dunaš BenLabraṭ (Granada: Univ. de Granada, 1980).
- Schröter, Robert (ed.), Tešuḇot Dunaš ha-Levi ben Labraṭ ʻal R.Seʻadyah Gaʾon (Breslau, 1866).

=== Manuscript facsimiles ===
- Cambridge, Cambridge University Library, T-S NS 143.46 (the poem of Dunash's wife, and his reply)
- Cambridge, Cambridge University Library, Mosseri IV.387.2, Mosseri VIII.202.2 (another manuscript of Dunash's wife's poem)
- "University of Pennsylvania Center for Advanced Judaic Studies Library Halper 317, fol. 2v". openn.library.upenn.edu.
