= Hind bint al-Khuss =

Legendary pre-Islamic Arab poet

Hind bint al-Khuss al-Iyādiyya (Arabic: هند بنت الخس الإيادية, also Hind ibnat al-Khuss al-Iyādiyya) is a legendary pre-Islamic female poet. While older scholarship supposed that Hind was a real person, recent research views her as an entirely legendary figure. Stories surrounding Hind focus on her eloquent responses to questions, sometimes in verse, sometimes in sajʿ (rhyming prose), and sometimes in prose, regarding gender, marriage, plants, animals or weather.

== Name ==
Hind is also known in some sources by the nickname al-Zarqāʾ. Tales of another legendary pre-Islamic Arabian woman, Zarqāʾ al-Yamāma, were conflated with tales of Hind, leading some people to think that the two figures were identical.

The origin of Hind's laqab, al-Khuss, is not clear, but some scholarship suggests that the Arabic word khuss meant 'the son of a man and a female jinn. If so, Hind was imagined to owe her exceptional skills to supernatural ancestry.

== Stories of Hind's life ==
Stories about Hind establish verisimilitude through mentioning real places and, in some cases, supposing a family for Hind. Ibn ʿArabi gives her a fulsome patronym: Hind bint al-Khuss ibn Ḥābis ibn Ḳurayṭ al-Iyādī (al-Iyādiyya). Al-Zamakhsharī's al-Mustaqṣā fī amthāl al-ʿarab imputes to her an unnamed daughter and a sister called Jumʿa. Ibn Abī Ṭāhir Ṭayfūr's Balāghāt al-nisāʾ has Hind and Jumʿa visiting the famous fair at ʿUkāẓ. Abū ʿUbayd portrays Hind having an affair with a slave.

Ali ibn Nasr al-Katib's Encyclopedia of Pleasure tells that Hind, known here as al-Zarqāʾ, loved the Christian woman Hind bint al-Nuʿmān, who was the daughter of the last Lakhmid king of Hira in the seventh century. When Hind Bint al-Khuss died, her faithful lover "cropped her hair, wore black clothes, rejected worldly pleasures, vowed to God that she would lead an ascetic life until she passed away". Hind bint al-Nu'man even builds a monastery to commemorate her love for al-Zarqāʾ. This source figures the two characters as the first lesbians in Arab culture.

== Works ==
Literature attributed to Hind tends to take the form of clever responses to questions and proverbial wisdom, reported in adab literature and philological treatises. In the words of Kathrin Müller,

The structure of these anecdotes is characteristic of texts preserving traditional knowledge of Bedouin life and its lexicographical material. Many questions follow the pattern “what is the best thing?—what is the worst?” Sometimes the questioner begins a sentence with “almost,” and Bint al-Khuss completes it, as in “almost, the ostrich is a bird.”

An incantation in the rajaz metre attributed to Zarqā'/Hind bint al-Khuss, characterised by D. Frolov as 'very archaic because of the abundance and diversity of foot variations', runs

yā layta dha-l-qatā liyah
wa-mithla niṣfin maʿiyah
ʾilā qaṭāti ʾahliyah
ʾidhan lanā qatan miyah

Translation:

If only those partridges belonged to me,
And about a half of them were with me
In addition to the partridges of my kin,
We would have one hundred partridges.

== Sources ==
The ninth-century CE scholar Abū l-ʿAbbās Thaʿlab had a now lost work called Tafsīr kalām Ibnat al-Khuss ('commentary on the sayings of Ibnat al-Khuss').

Stories about Hind remained in circulation in Algeria into the twentieth century.

== Editions and translations ==
- Perron, Femmes arabes avant et depuis l’Islamisme (Paris: Librarie Nouvelle; Algiers: Tissier, 1858), pp. 43–46 translates Hind material from al-Suyūṭī's Muzhir (characterised by Charles Pellat as a 'bad translation').
