= Rithā' =

Genre of Arabic poetry

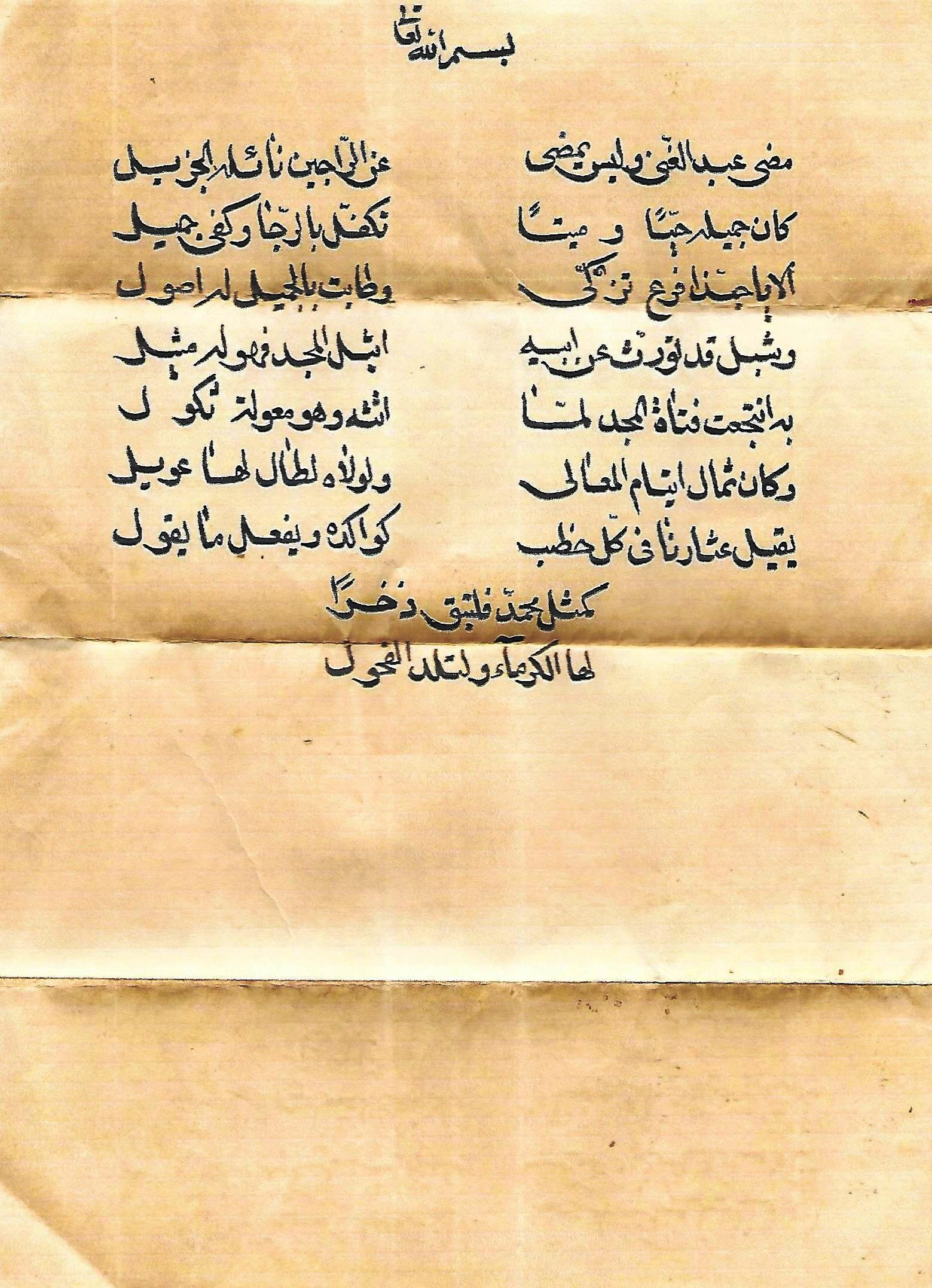
Rithā written in Arabic, 1863

Rithā’ (Arabic: رثاء) is a genre of Arabic poetry corresponding to elegy or lament. Along with elegy proper (marthiyah, plural marāthī), rithā’ may also contain taḥrīḍ (incitement to vengeance).

== Characteristics ==
The genre was used by both male and female poets, and is one of the main genres in which ancient and medieval Arabic female poets are known to have composed. Almost all known pre-Islamic women's poetry is in this form. The subjects of the rithā’ are (almost) invariably dead male warriors (fursān) and lords (sādah), predominantly those who fell in battle.

The genre is prominent in the corpus of the earliest surviving Arabic poetry; it 'provides some of the most moving examples of the poetic voice, as in the poems of al-Khansā' (d. ca. 644) for her brother, Ṣakhr, killed in tribal combat':

I was sleepless and I passed the night

keeping vigil, as if my eyes had
been anointed with pus,

For I had heard--and it was not news

to rejoice me--one making a report,
who had come repeating intelligence,

Saying, 'Sakhr is dwelling there in a

tomb, struck to the ground beside
the grave, between certain stones'

Alongside al-Khansā', major female exponents of the rithā’ poems of whose survive include the pre-Islamic Janūb Ukht ‘Amr dhī-l-Kalb, Laylā al-Akhyaliyya (d. 706 CE), and Laylā bint Ṭarīf (d. 815 CE). Their style was characterised by 'uninhibited expression of sorrow coupled with praise for the deceased'. 'Most of the elegy composed by men, however, resembled the eulogistic qaṣīdah in general pattern'.

== See also ==
- Rithā' al-Andalus
- Marsiya
