= Nashit =

Iranian musician

Nashit (Arabic: نشیط derived from Persian: نشید)
- Occupation: Singer
- Years active: Second half of the 1st century A.H. in Medina
- Known for: Introducing Persian style of singing to Medina

Nashit (Arabic: نشیط derived from Persian: نشید; fl. second half of the 7th century) was a singer of Persian origin, acquired as a slave by Abd Allah b. Dja'far b. Abi Talib, and who flourished in the second half of the 1st century A.H. in Medina.

His Persian style of singing was a great success there, compelling other singers to imitate it, but Nashit himself had to learn the Arab style and songs in order to enlarge his repertoire.
