= Zaynab al-Mariyya =

Zaynab al-Mariyya (c. 11th–13th centuries) was an adība (woman of letters) and poet, most likely born in Almería, Andalusia, Spain.

Among Andalusian women poets, she left behind some of the fewest details of her life. Her surname implies that she was born in Almería, and the lack of a known lineage could indicate that she was a slave.

She is mentioned by the scholar Ibn Abd al-Malik al-Marrakushi, which means she lived before his time, possibly in the 11th or 12th century, as that was the height of economic and cultural splendor in Taifa of Almería under the reign of Abu Yahya Muhammad al-Mutasim. This would make Zaynab al-Mariyya a contemporary of al-Gassaniyya, another female poet in Almería.

Of her work, only one poem remains, a courtly love poem:

You who ride after your desire,
wait, and I will tell you what I suffer.
Men do not dispute the love they feel,
but my passion for them exceeds their own.
It is enough for me to see my beloved happy,
and for his love and his happiness
I will push on until the end of time.
