= Hamda bint Ziyad al-Muaddib =

Al-Andalus poet

- حمدة بنت زياد المؤدب
- Born: 12th century Guadix, Al-Andalus
- Occupation: Poet
- Relatives: Zaynab bint Ziyad al-Muaddib (sister)
- Writing career
- Language: Arabic
- Period: 12th century
- Genre: Poetry
- Notable work: "Beside a Stream"

Ḥamda bint Ziyād al-Muʾaddib (Arabic: حمدة بنت زياد المؤدب) was a twelfth-century Andalusian poet from Guadix, sister of Zaynab bint Ziyad al-Muʾaddib, and described by the seventeenth-century diplomat Mohammed ibn abd al-Wahab al-Ghassani as 'one of the poetesses of the Andalus. She is famous in that region and among all the poets and poetesses of the country.' Her father was a teacher (mu'addib), and she is described as being one of 'the brotherless only daughters of well-off and cultured fathers who gave them the education that they would have given to their male children, if they had had any'. She is one of relatively few named Moorish women poets.

== Example ==
One example of Hamda's work is the poem referred to by A. J. Arberry as 'Beside a Stream', given here in his translation:

I sat beside a stream
Of loveliness supreme,
And with my tears expressed
The secrets of my breast.

A mead of emerald
About each river rolled,
And every meadow round
A silver river wound.

Among the shy gazelles
Ran lovely fawns, whose spells
Enslaved my mind, whose art
Bewitching stole my heart.

They lulled their eyes asleep
But for a purpose deep
Which (as true lover knows)
Denies me all repose.

They let their tresses fall
And there, as I recall,
Into the jet-black skies
I saw a moon arise.

The dawn, methinks, bereaved
Of so dear brother, grieved
For so sad loss, and so
Put on the garb of woe.

This can be compared with Nabil Matar's translation of the same poem:

Tears have betrayed my secrets in a wadi [valley] whose beauty is striking;
A river surrounds every meadow; and every meadow borders every wadi;
Among the gazelle, a black fawn stole my mind, after stealing my heart;
She desires to lie down for a reason, and that reason prevents my sleep;
When she loosens her tufts, I see the full moon in the black clouds,
As if the dawn had lost a brother, and in sorrow, clothed itself in mourning.
