= Al-Khansa' =

Companion of Muhammad and Arabic poet

al-Khansāʾ
- الخنساء
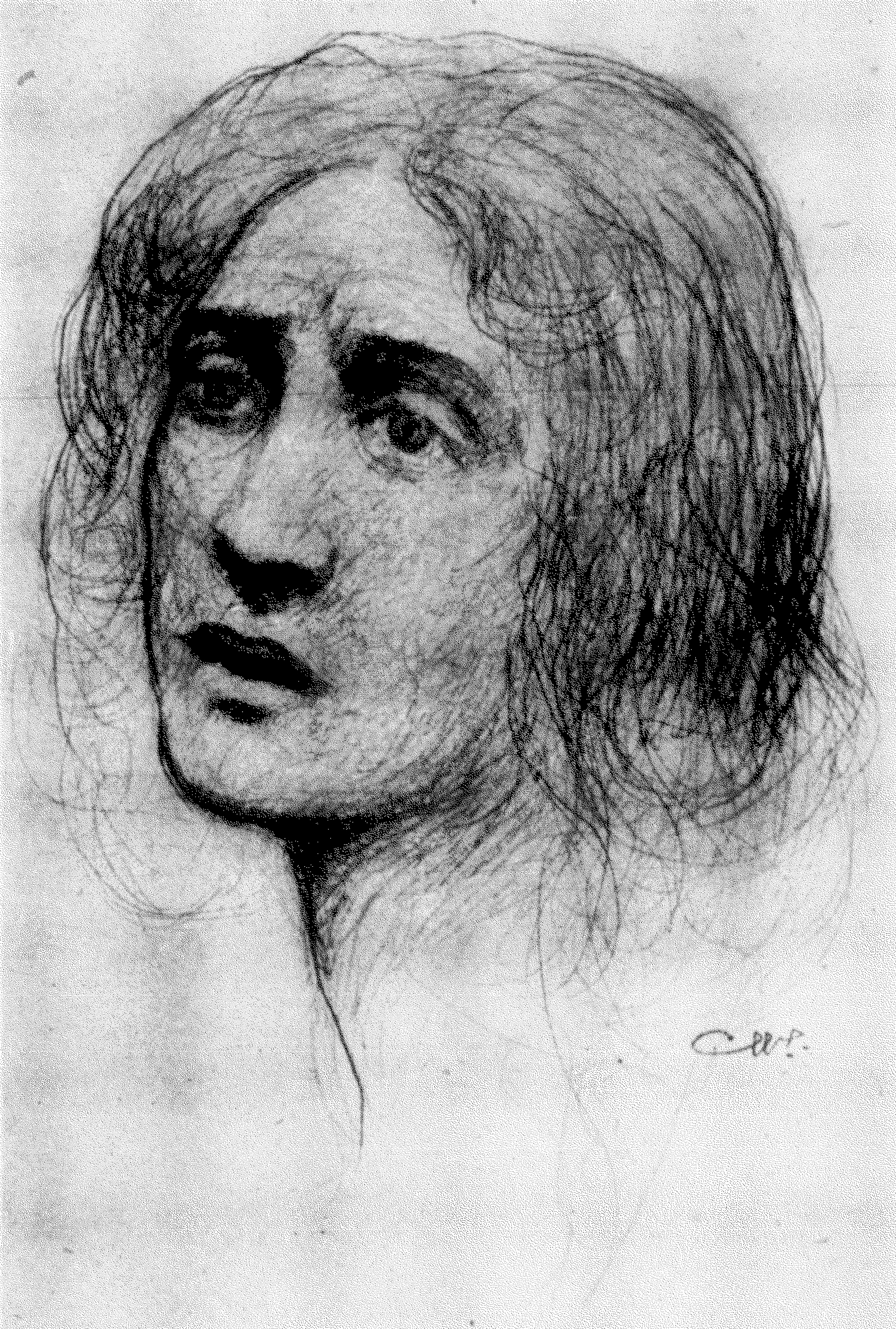
- 1917 drawing of al-Khansa' by Kahlil Gibran
- Born: c. 575; Safeena, Arabia (present-day Mahd Al-Dhahab Madinah Region, Saudi Arabia)
- Died: c. 645/646. Najd, Arabia (present-day Riyadh, Saudi Arabia)
- Occupation: Poet

Tumāḍir bint ʿAmr ibn al-Ḥārith ibn al-Sharīd al-Sulamīyah (Arabic: تماضر بنت عمرو بن الحارث بن الشريد السُلمية), usually simply referred to as al-Khansāʾ (Arabic: الخنساء, meaning "snub-nosed", an Arabic epithet for a gazelle as metaphor for beauty) was a 7th-century tribeswoman, living in the Arabian Peninsula. She was one of the most influential poets of the pre-Islamic and early Islamic periods.

In her time, the role of a female poet was to write elegies for the dead and perform them for the tribe in public oral competitions. Al-Khansāʾ won respect and fame in these competitions with her elegies, and is widely considered as the finest author of Arabic elegies and one of the greatest and best known female Arab poets of all time. In 629, she went to Medina with a deputation from her clan and, after meeting the Islamic prophet Muhammad, embraced the new religion. Her poetry was later recorded by Muslim scholars, who were studying unaltered Arabic of her time in order to explicate the language of early Islamic texts.

== Life ==
Al-Khansāʾ was born and raised in the Najd in the Arabian Peninsula into a wealthy family of the tribe of Sulaym, and was the daughter of the head of the al-Sharid clan. According to both contemporary as well as later judgement, she was the most powerful female poet of her time. In pre-Islamic society, the role of a female poet, such as al-Khansā’, was to compose elegies for the tribesmen who fell in the battlefield. Her extraordinary fame rests mainly on her elegiac poetry composed for her two brothers, Sakhr and Mu‘āwiya, who were killed in tribal skirmishes of Banū Sulaym with Banū Murra and Banū Asad, predating Islam.

In 612, her brother Muʿawiyah was killed by members of another tribe. Al-Khansāʾ insisted that her brother, Ṣakhr, avenge Muʿawiyah's death, which he did. Ṣakhr was wounded in the process and died of his wounds a year later. Al-Khansāʾ mourned her two brothers' deaths in poetry, writing over a hundred elegies about the two of them alone, and began to gain fame for her elegiac compositions, especially due to her powerful recitals. The contemporary Arab poet al-Nabigha said to her, "You are the finest poet of the jinn and the humans." (Arabic: إنك أشعر الجن والإنس). Similarly, another anecdote says that al-Nabigha told al-Khansāʾ, "If Abu Basir had not already recited to me, I would have said that you are the greatest poet of the Arabs. Go, for you are the greatest poet among those with breasts". She responded by saying, "I'm the greatest poet among those with testicles, too".

She was a contemporary of Muhammad, and eventually converted to Islam. It is said that Muhammad would ask her to recite some of her poetry for him, and he would love listening to her. Whenever she paused after a recital, he would gesture her to keep going and say, "Go on, Khunās!" Muhammad even rated al-Khansāʾ over Imru' al-Qais, the most famous poet of the classical Arabic tradition, as the one with greater poetic abilities.

She was married at least twice, and had six children, all of whom were also poets and eventually converted to Islam. Four of them, Yazīd, Muʿāwiyah, ʿAmr, and ʿAmrah, were killed in the Battle of Qadisiyah. When she received the news, she allegedly said, "Praise be to God who honored me with their martyrdom. And I have hope from my Lord that he will reunite me with them in the abode of his mercy." (Arabic: الحمد لله الذي شرفني بقتلهم، وأرجو من ربي أن يجمعني بهم في مستقر رحمته).

She died in 645 or 646.

== Poetry and importance in the history of Arabic literature ==
The poems of al-Khansā’ are short and marked by a strong and traditional sense of despair at the irrevocable loss of life. Apart from her poetical talent, her significance lies in having raised the early Arabic elegiac tradition to the level of qarīd poetry instead of sadj‘ or radjaz. Her style and expression, which assured her a superiority in this genre, became stereotyped in the later rithā’ poetry. As an outstanding poet and female figure in the history of Arabic literature, the position of al-Khansā’ is unique. Al-Khansa’s elegies were later collected by Ibn al-Sikkit (802–858 CE), a literary scholar of the early Abbasid era. Nearly a thousand lines of her poetry remain.

== Editions and translations ==
- James E. Montgomery, Loss Sings, The Cahiers Series, 32 (Sylph Editions, 2019), ISBN 1909631272
- In 2021, it was announced that Yasmine Seale would translate al-Khansa's work for the Library of Arabic Literature series.

== See also ==
- Arabic poetry
- Women in Arab societies
- Women in Muslim societies
