= Rieu =

Rieu can refer to:

- André Rieu (born 1949), Dutch violinist and conductor
- Annette Rieu, a character in Jeanne Galzy's 1929 novel L'Initiatrice aux mains vides (Burnt Offering)
- Bún riêu, a Vietnamese meat
- D. C. H. Rieu (1916–2008), scholar
- Charloun Rieu (1846–1924), French farmer and poet
- Charles Pierre Henri Rieu (1820–1902), Swiss Orientalist
- E. V. Rieu (1887–1972), translator
- Jean Rieu (18th century), banker, owner of Prangins Castle (1719–1723)
- Jean-Louis Rieu (1788–1868), soldier and politician
- Jean Louis Rieu (1872–1964), Commissioner of Sind in British India (1920–1925)
- Nicole Rieu (born 1949), French singer
- Paul du Rieu (1859 (?)–1901), architect
- Willem Nicolaas du Rieu (1829–1896), librarian of Leiden University Library
