= Biblical people in Islam =

There are many Biblical figures which the Qur'an names. Some, however, go unnamed in the Qur'an, but are referenced or referred to in the hadiths, tafsirs, literature or seerah. Other figures are mentioned elsewhere in tradition and in the sunnah and sayings of Muhammad. Such figures which are not mentioned by name in the Qur'an, are included below.

== Old Testament ==
=== Cain and Abel ===
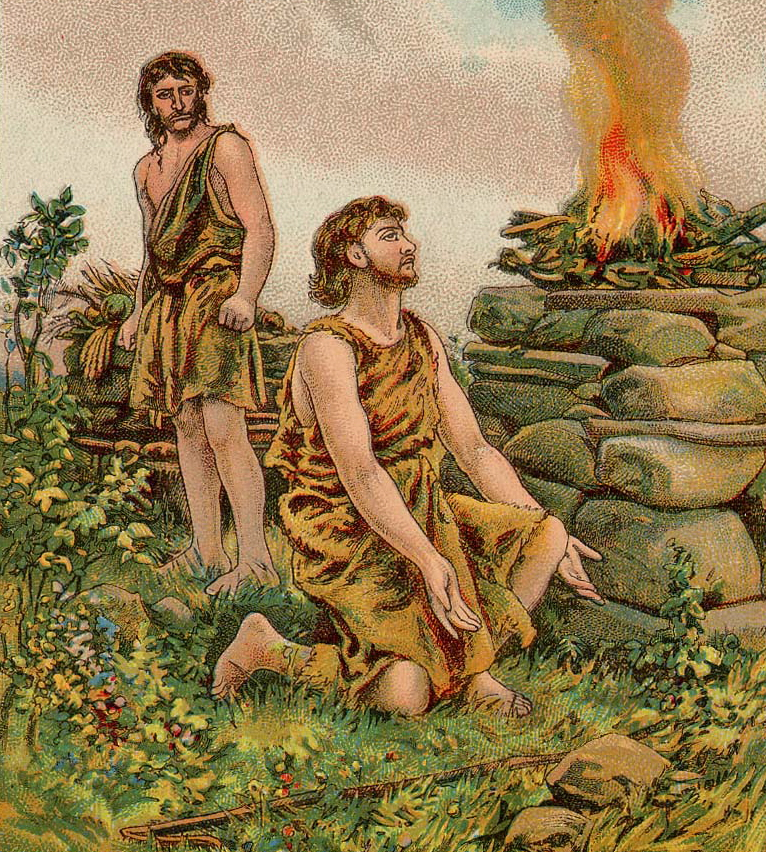
A Bible illustration depicting Cain and Abel offering up their sacrifices

Cain and Abel (Arabic: هابيل,قابيل; Qābīl and Hābīl) are believed by Muslims to have been the first two sons of Adam and Eve. The story in the Qur'an is virtually the same as the Hebrew Bible narrative, saying that both the brothers were asked to offer up individual sacrifices to God. God accepted Abel's sacrifice because of Abel's righteousness and Cain, out of jealousy, slew Abel. This was the first ever sin committed upon Earth but Abel was chronicled in history as one of the first believers and as the first ever martyr. A handful of Muslim sources have identified Abel as a prophet like his father, but this identification is not traditional.

==== Story of Cain and Abel ====
Of Adam's first children, Cain was the elder son and Abel the younger. Each of them presented a sacrifice to God but it was accepted only from Abel, because of the latter's righteous attitude and his faith and firm belief in Allah.

===== Cain speaks to Abel =====
After the offering of their sacrifices, Cain, the wicked sibling, taunted Abel out of envy and told him that he would surely slay him. Abel justly warned Cain that God only accepted the sacrifice of those that are righteous in their doings. He further went onto tell Cain that if Cain did indeed try to slay him, Abel would not retaliate and slay him because the God-fearing would never murder for the sake of envy. Abel then told Cain that in murdering him, he would carry the weight not only of his sin but also of the sins of his victim The victim, as a result, in suffering the injustice, would be forgiven his own sins and the murderer, while being warned, would consequently increase his own sin. Abel preached powerfully and reminded Cain that the punishment for murder would be that he would spend the afterlife in the fires of Hell.

===== Cain slays Abel =====
The innocent pleading and preaching of Abel had no effect upon Cain, for he was full of arrogance, pride and jealousy. He subsequently slew the righteous Abel, but in doing so, he ruined himself and became of those who remain lost. This would be the earliest example of the murder of a righteous man taking place upon the earth. In the future, many other evildoers would slay the wise and pious believers.

===== Shame of Cain =====
Right after the murder took place, God sent a raven who scratched the ground to show Cain how to bury the bodies of the deceased. Cain, in his shame, began to curse himself and became full of guilt. He at last realized how dreadful it was to slay anyone, the more so as the victim was an innocent and righteous man, as well as his brother. Full of regrets, Cain was marked with deep sorrow. This was, however, no true repentance.

==== Message and moral ====
God makes it clear in the Qur'an that the story of Cain and Abel was a message for the Children of Israel (who habitually murdered their prophets as stated in Surah Al-Baqara 2:87), as it had told them about the consequences of murder and that the killing of one person would be as if they had slain the whole of mankind. But still people rejected the message of the story and continued to commit grave sins, slaying prophets and messengers as well as the righteous people.

All the prophets who preached since the time of Adam were persecuted, insulted or reviled in one way or another. With some righteous men, however, the evildoers went one step further, in attempting to slay them or indeed slaying them. The Qur'an itself mentions the slaying of the righteous, saying in Surah Al Imran 3:21 "As to those who deny the Signs of Allah and in defiance of right, slay the prophets, and slay those who teach just dealing with mankind, announce to them a grievous penalty". Historical examples of the righteous being slain include Zakariyya (Zechariah) and his son Yahya (John).

=== Sarah ===
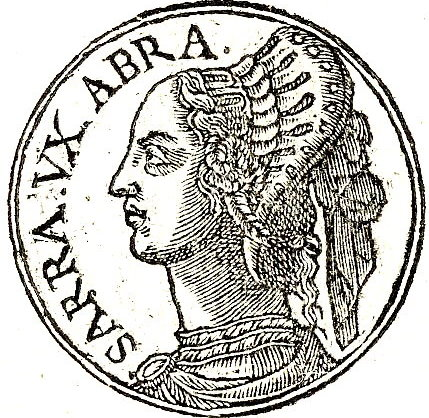
Sarah, as depicted on Promptuarii Iconum Insigniorum by Guillaume Rouillé

Sarah (Arabic: سارة, Sāra), the wife of the patriarch and Islamic prophet Ibrāhīm (Abraham) and the mother of the prophet Ishaq (Isaac) is an honoured woman in the Islamic faith. According to Muslim belief, she was Abraham's first wife. Although not mentioned by name in the Qur'an, she is referenced and alluded to via the story of her husband. She lived with Abraham throughout her life and, although she was barren, God promised her the birth of a prophetic son and a prophetic grandson by the name of Ya`qūb (Jacob).

==== Story of Sarah ====
Sarah and Abraham had no children. Abraham, however, prayed constantly to God for a son. Sarah, being barren, subsequently gave him her Egyptian handmaiden, Hājar (Hagar), to wed as his second wife. Hagar bore Ismā'īl (Ishmael), when Abraham was 86, who too would become a prophet of God like his father.

===== The birth of Isaac =====
Thirteen years later, God announced to Abraham, now a hundred, that the barren Sarah would give birth to his second son, Isaac, who would also be a prophet of the Lord. Although the Qur'an does not mention Sarah by name, it vividly mentions the annunciation of the birth of Isaac. The Qur'an mentions that Sarah laughed when the angels gave her the glad tidings of Isaac, which is perhaps why the name Isaac (in Arabic Ishaq) has the root meaning of 'laughter'.

There came Our messengers to Abraham with glad tidings. They said, 'Peace!' He answered, 'Peace!' and hastened to entertain them with a roasted calf.
But when he saw their hands went not towards the (meal), he felt some mistrust of them, and conceived a fear of them. They said: "Fear not: We have been sent against the people of Lut.
And his wife was standing (there), and she laughed: But we gave her glad tidings of Isaac, and after him, of Jacob.
She said: "Alas for me! shall I bear a child, seeing I am an old woman, and my husband here is an old man? That would indeed be a wonderful thing!"

— Qur'an, Sura 11 (Hud), ayat 69-72

==== Tomb of Sarah ====
Sarah is believed by Muslims to be buried in the Cave of the Patriarchs (known by Muslims as the Sanctuary of Abraham). The compound, located in the ancient city of Hebron, is the second holiest site for Jews (after the Temple Mount in Jerusalem), and is also venerated by Christians and Muslims, both of whom have traditions which maintain that the site is the burial place of three Biblical couples: Abraham and Sarah, Isaac and Rebecca, and Jacob and Leah. Although Jews alternatively also believe this to be the burial place for Adam and Eve, this is a view not usually adopted by Muslims.

=== Balaam ===
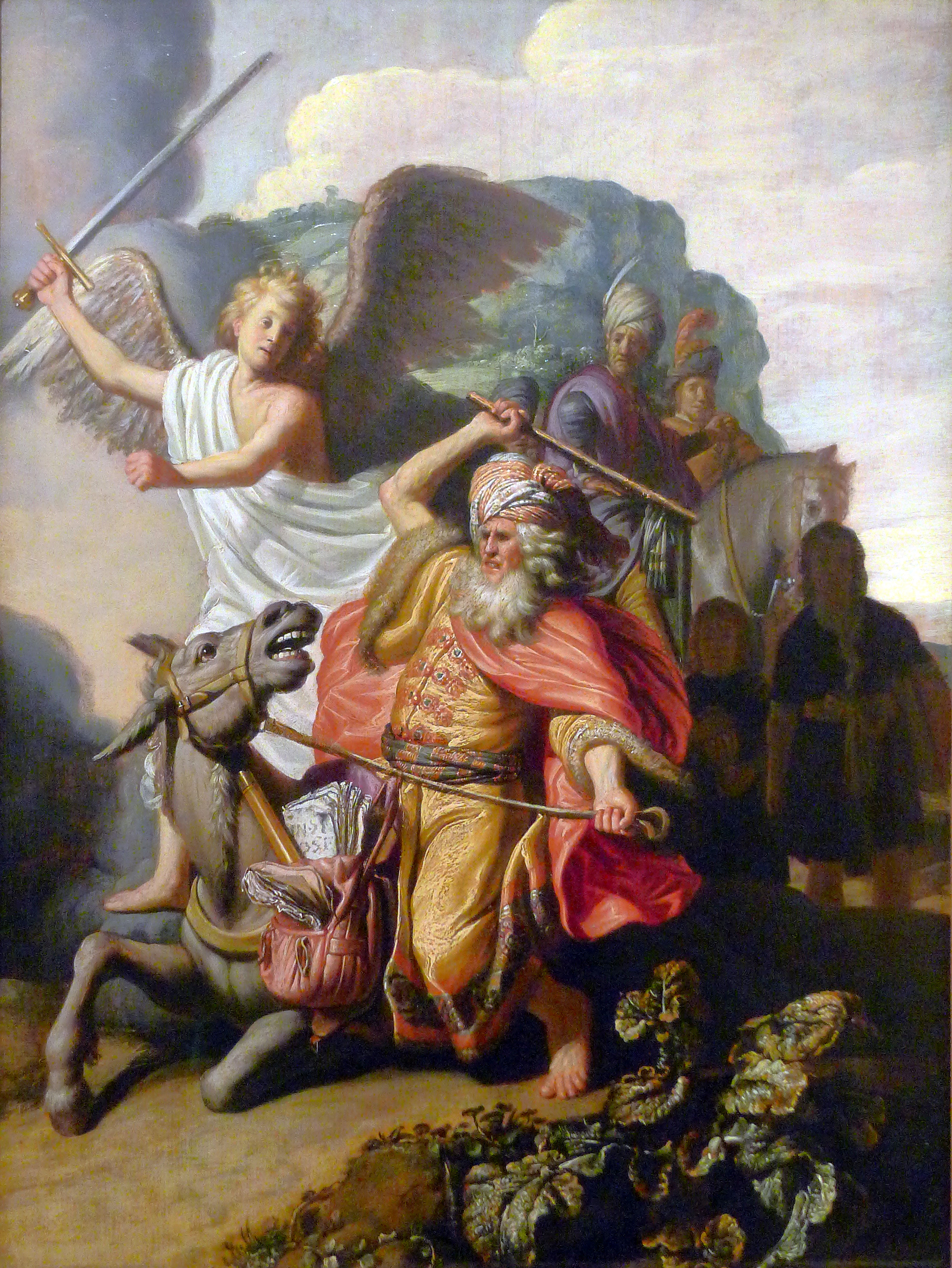
Rembrandt's Balaam and the Ass

In regards to Balaam in Islam, it is very doubtful whether there is any reference to Balaam in the Qur'an. Old classical commentators applied to him, but with reservations:

Relate to them the story of the man to whom We sent Our signs, but he passed them by: so Satan followed him up, and he went astray.
If it had been Our will, We should have elevated him with Our signs; but he inclined to the earth, and followed his own vain desires. His similitude is that of a dog: if you attack him, he lolls out his tongue, or if you leave him alone, he (still) lolls out his tongue. That is the similitude of those who reject Our signs; So relate the story; perchance they may reflect.

— Qur'an, sura 7 (Al-A'raf), ayat 175-176

Many modern commentators, including Abdullah Yusuf Ali, however, feel that the tale of Balaam was different and unrelated.

=== Jeremiah ===
Ibn Kathir considers Jeremiah (Arabic: أرميا, Armaya) to be a prophet of Islam, though he is not mentioned in the Qur'an; in his book Stories Of The Prophets, places Jeremiah in the prophetic pantheon, alongside fellow Old Testament prophets Daniel, Ezekiel and Isaiah. Scholars believe that Jeremiah was a descendant of Levi, son of Jacob, and lived at a troubled time when there were many false prophets spreading false messages.

=== Daniel ===
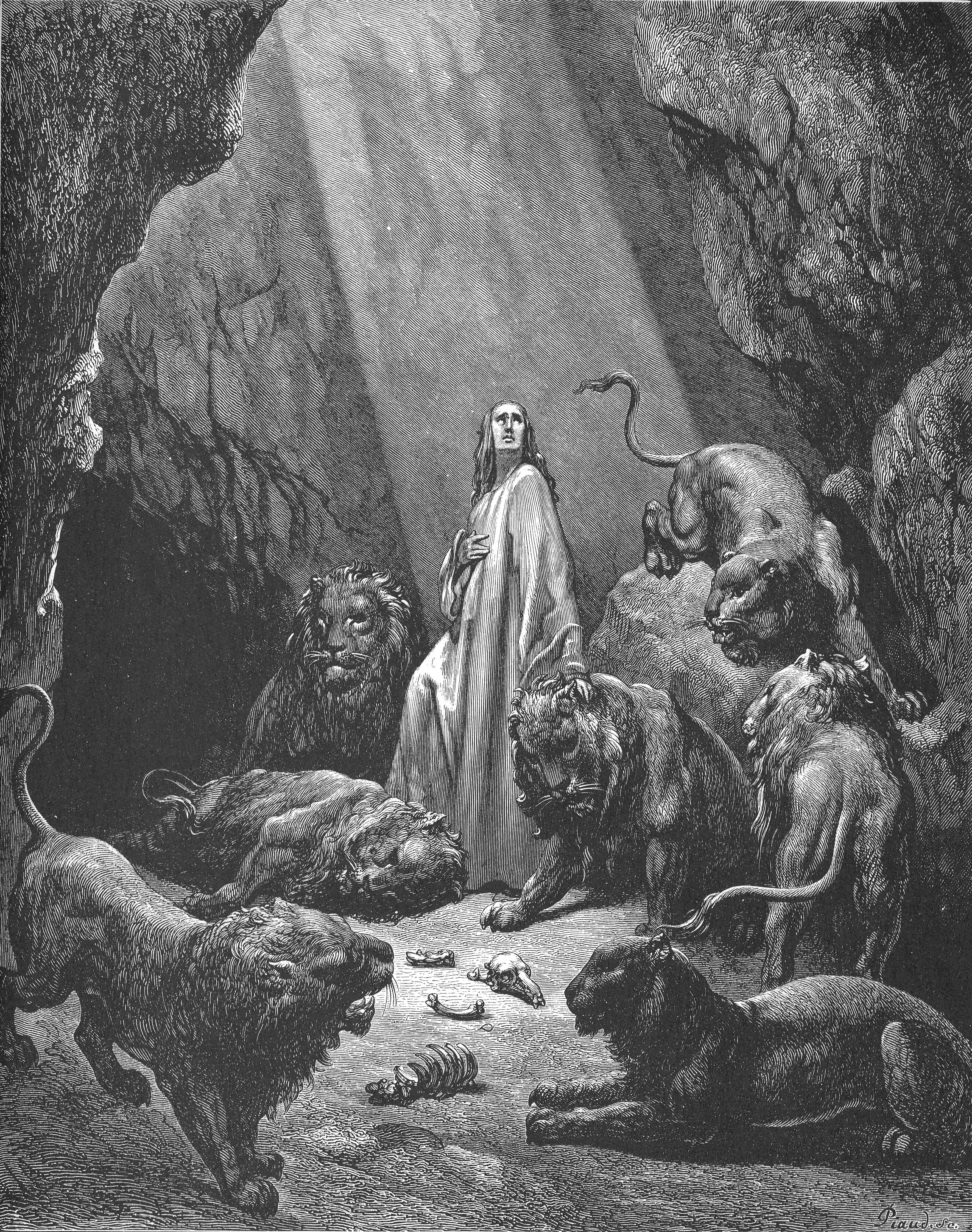
Gustave Dore's engraving Daniel In The Lion's Den

Danyal (Arabic: دانيال), known as Daniel in the Bible, is traditionally considered by Ibn Kathirs to be a prophet, alongside the other major prophets of the Old Testament, namely Isaiah, Jeremiah and Ezekiel. Although he is not mentioned in the Qur'an, there are a few Hadith which bear his name and which refer to his time spent in the den of the lions. There are debates, however, that go on about Daniel's time of preaching and some Muslims believe that he was not a prophet but instead a saintly man.

==== Story of Daniel ====
It was he who preached in Babylonian 'Iraq, exhorting the people to return to God. He lived during the reign of Cyrus, and taught this prince the unity of God and the true religion. Al-Tabari says ("Chronique," French translation of Zotenberg, i. 44) that thousands of people who had died in a certain town from an epidemic were resuscitated a thousand years later by the prayer of Daniel.

When Daniel had become a noted prophet, Cyrus made him the chief of all his kingdom in order that he might teach his people the true religion. Daniel asked the king to let him go back to Israel and re-build the Temple or Bayt Ha-Mikdash in Hebrew. Cyrus consented to the reconstruction of the sanctuary, but refused to let him go, saying, "If I had a thousand prophets like thee, I should have them all stay with me". There is another tradition, to the effect that Daniel was king of the Israelites after their return from captivity.
