= Al Imran =

3rd chapter of the Quran

Surah 3 of the Quran
آل عِمْرَانَ Āl ʿImrān The Family of Imran
- Qira'ah; English text
- Classification: Medinan
- Position: Juzʼ 3–4
- Hizb no.: 5, 6 and 7
- No. of verses: 200
- No. of Rukus: 21
- No. of words: 3481
- No. of letters: 14762

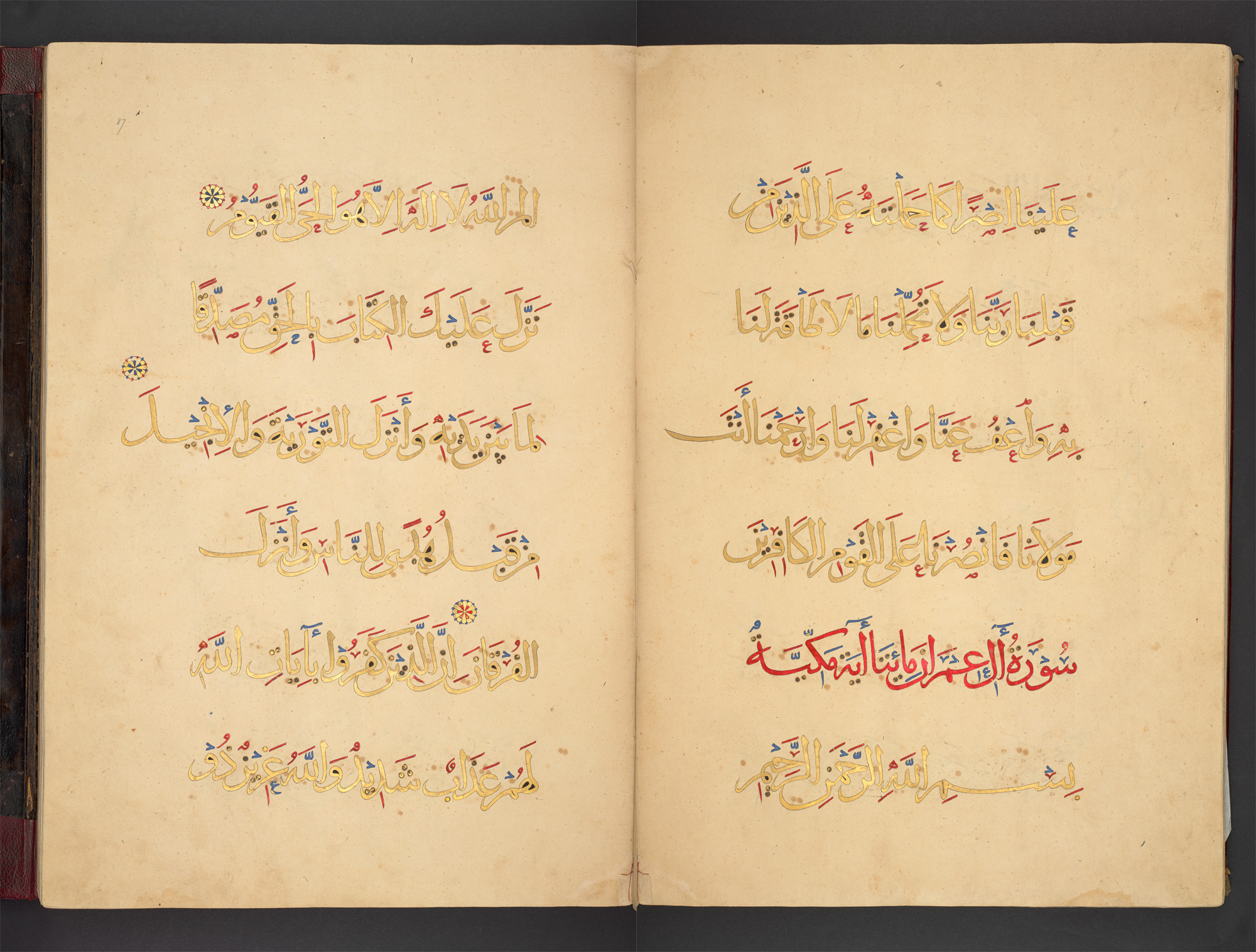
Double-page with the beginning of the chapter Al Imran. Text page written in gold thuluth script outlined in black, with the chapter heading overlaid in red ink. From the Qur'an commissioned by the future sultan Baibars in 1304. British Library

Al Imran (Arabic: آل عِمْرَانَ, āl ʿimrān; meaning: The Family of Imran) is the third chapter (sūrah) of the Quran with two hundred verses (āyāt). This chapter is named after the family of Imran (Joachim), which includes Imran, wife of Imran, Mary, and Jesus.

Regarding the timing and contextual background of the asbāb al-nuzūl or circumstances of revelation, the chapter is believed to have been either the second or third of the Medinan surahs, as it references both the events of the battles of Badr and Uhud. Almost all of it also belongs to the third Hijri year, though a minority of its verses might have been revealed during the visit of the deputation of the Christian community of Najran at the event of the mubahala, which occurred around the 10th year of the Hijrah.

== Summary ==
- 1-2 God is one and self-existent
- 3-4 The Quran is to be believed
- 5-6 God omniscient
- 7 Plain and obscure verses of the Quran
- 8-9 The prayer of those versed in Quranic mystery
- 10-12 The punishment of Pharaoh a warning to infidels
- 13 The victory at the Battle of Badr alluded to
- 14-18 The faithful, their character and reward
- 19-20 Islam the true religion
- 21-25 The punishment of unbelievers eternal
- 26-27 God omnipotent and sovereign
- 28-34 Obedience to the Rabbinical lineage of Abraham enjoined.
- 35-38 The Virgin Mary - her conception - nurtured by Zacharias
- 39-41 John the Baptist, his birth
- 42-57 Christ announced to the Virgin - his miracles, apostles etc.
- 58-65 Muhammad's dispute with the Christians of Najran
- 66-77 The hypocritical Jews reproached
- 78-83 Prophets not to be worshipped
- 84-91 God's curse on infidels
- 92 Almsgiving enjoined
- 93-95 The Jews unlawfully forbid certain meats
- 96-97 The Kaaba founded
- 98-120 The lot of infidels and believers contrasted
- 121-122 The battle of Uhud alluded to
- 123 The narration about divine intervention from God in battle of Badr, as the number of personnel and war equipments brought by Muslims are few. Muhammad al-Bukhari giving commentary about the conclusion of this verse by correlate the subsequent event about the conversation between Muhammad and Gabriel, that the help which Allah sent down to bring victory to the Muslims were in the form of the army of best angels among their kinds. This were viewed as the instruction from the verse for Muslims to always fear and be thankful for Allah.
- 124 Consensus of Islamic scholars and clerics has enclosed various hadiths as interpretation material for this verse that Gabriel, Michael, Raphael (Note: found in Mustadrak al Sahihayn. The complete narration from Al-Hakim al-Nishapuri: Abu Abdullah Muhammad bin Yaqoub has reported from Ibrahim bin Abdullah Al-Saadi, who told us Muhammad bin Khalid bin Uthma, told us Musa bin Yaqoub, told me Abu Al-Huwairith, that Muhammad bin Jubayr bin Mut’im told him, that he heard Ali - may God be pleased with him - addresses the people, and he said: While I was leaving from the well of Badr, a strong wind came, the like of which I had never seen, then it left, then came a strong wind, the like of which I have never seen except for the one before it, then it went, then came a strong wind that I did not see before. I have never seen anything like it except for the one before it, and the first wind was Gabriel descended among a thousand angels with the Messenger of God - may God bless him and grant him peace - and the second wind was Michael who descended among a thousand angels to the right of the Messenger of God - may God bless him and his family and grant them peace - and Abu Bakr was On his right, and the third wind was Israfil. He descended with a thousand angels on the side of the Messenger of God - may God’s prayers and peace be upon him and his family - and I was on the right side. When God Almighty defeated his enemies, the Messenger of God - may God’s prayers and peace be upon him and his family - carried me on his horse, I blew up, and I fell On my heels, I prayed to God Almighty. Ibn al Mulqin, a hadith scholar from Córdoba in al-Andalus, century, evaluated this hadith and found it ḍaʻīf (weak). However, recent scholarship from Ali Hasan al-Halabi has noted there is another hadith which supported the participation of Raphael in Badr) (Note: According to Islamic belief in weak chain of Hadith, Israfil were acknowledged as angel who were tasked to blower of Armageddon trumpet. Suyuti mentioned Israfil as Muezzin among angels, possessed four wings, while Suyuti also mentioned another narrator Israfil possessed twelve wings instead. Israfil also mentioned by Suyuti as Muezzin among angels and a member of a group of biggest archangels who bear the Throne of God on their back. However, Abu Bakar al-Hudhali opined the angel who blowing horn were different from Israfil, while Abu Said Al-Khudri mentioned the blower of horn were in fact consisted of two angels, while he supported the opinion that Israfil were also one of the blower. However, Muhammad Nasiruddin al-Albani analyzed the hadith were Hadith terminology#Munkar and should not be trusted.) and thousands of the best angels from the third level of sky, all came to the battle of Badr. According to a Hadith narrated by Suyuti, the third sky angels were said to rode horses. (Note: The mystical horses rode by angels were mentioned in the Hadith of Muhammad were mentioned the name of one of the angel horses.) Meanwhile, Mahdi Rizqullah has compiled the commentary from classical Islamic scholars, that the verse narration about the angels attendance in the battle were also supported by hadiths from hadith collection from Muslim ibn Hajjaj, Ahmad ibn Hanbal, and the also from Quranic historiography work by Ibn Kathir. Muhammad Nasiruddin al-Albani gave commentary of another supportive narration from al-Baihaqi and Ibn Ishaq, through various hadith narration chains about the testimony from several different sahabah. This included the narration of Abbas ibn Abd al-Muttalib who at that time fought on the side of Qurayshite polytheist, who testified that he has been taken captive on the aftermath of the battle by a horse rider whom he did not recognize at all from Muslims rank. According to the hadith authority from Ahmad ibn Hanbal, The captor of Abbas were confirmed by Muhammad as one of the angel who helped the Muslims during this battle. (Note: Biography of the Prophet An Analytical Study Based on Authentic Sources by Mahdi Rizqullah which published in Indonesian language were praised by Jonathan E. Brockopp from Cambridge University Press for providing more details of Prophetic biography narration which does not offered by Mohammed Hussein Heikal biography works.)
- 125 The angels that came to aid the Muslims in Badr has been strengthened by another five thousands of their kinds who wearing distinctive marks on their bodies, and on their horses which they rode which will be recognized by the Muslims in the battlefield. The distinctive marks which are reported by some reports are said to be a white scarves, while another opinions says they are red or yellow. more ️clearer source has stated that the angels has taken form of Zubayr ibn al-Awwam, companion of Muhammad. (Note: According to one Hadith, Muhammad were told that the angels that appeared in the battle of Badr were highest in status and the "best of angels" according to Gabriel.) Zubayr were said usually wore yellow turban most of the time, as prophet Muhammad spoke in hadith the army of angels dressing in yellow headgear and the clothing similar to Zubayr's attire. (Note: Al-Hakim al-Nishapuri recorded in his Al-Mustadrak ala al-Sahihayn in a narration which deemed authentic by Bawazier in his Marwiyyat Ghazwatul Badr Ibn Hajar al-Asqalani authorized it as authentic through Kitāb aṭ-Tabaqāt al-Kabīr written by Ibn Sa'd) (Note: According to one narration, during the battle, Muhammad has found an angel whom he though as Zubayr standing next to him, which then prompted Muhammad to command him to attack, which the angel, in Zubayr appearance, simply replied, "I am not Zubayr." Thus, according to Hadith expert this another indication that the angels truly came down with the appearance of Zubayr during Badr. According to commentary from the interpretation expert by comparing the hadiths, this are deemed as Zubayr special virtue and honor according to Islamic belief.)
- 126 According to various Qur'anic Tafsir scholars, particularly those who endorsed by Religious ministry of Saudi Arabia and Indonesia, this verse affirms that the victory of Muslims in Badr were solely due to the help from God who sent His angels as sign good news and fulfilment of the promise to give them victory in battle.
- 128-129 Disheartened Muslims encouraged
- 130-136 Usury forbidden
- 137-138 The doom of defamers of the apostles
- 139-144 Islam not dependent on Muhammad for success
- 145-148 The former prophets are examples of perseverance
- 149-151 Unbelievers to be avoided
- 152-153 Certain Muslims disobedient at Uhud
- 154 This verse narrates the feel drowsiness and comfort which covers the Muslims before the battle. this event were agreed by both Abdul-Rahman al-Sa'di and group of contemporary scholars from Saudi Arabia, both from Islamic University of Madinah and committee of Masjid al-Haram this verse were revealed just before the battle of Uhud, based from Hadith narrated by Zubayr ibn al-Awwam. (Note: Zubayr ibn al-Awwam, personal bodyguard of Muhammad and participant of battle of Uhud, testified that just before the battle, he experienced a heavy drowsiness which also felt by entire Muslims. This Hadith strengthened by another Hadith from Abu Talha which recorded in sahih al-Bukhari.)
- 155-157 The hypocrites rebuked
- 158-159 Muslims slain at Uhud to enter paradise
- 160-161 Mild treatment of vacillating Muslims
- 162-165 The spoils of war to be honestly divided
- 166-169 The faithful sifted by defeat at Uhud
- 172 Regarding Battle of Hamra al-Asad participation of Zubayr ibn al-Awwam and Abu Bakar, as exegesis scholars believed that "those who responded to the call of Allah and His Messenger after their injury" depicted in Ali Imran, 3:172 were intended to be az-Zubayr and Abu Bakar, two of Sahaba who lead the vanguard of this battle, after they receiving injuries from the battle of Uhud.
- 173-176 Certain Muslims commended for faithfulness
- 177-180 The fate of unbelievers
- 181 The miser's doom
- 182-190 Scoffing Jews denounced—they charge Muhammad with imposture
- 191-195 Meditations and prayers of the pious
- 196-198 God's answer to the prayers of the pious
- 199 Certain believing Jews and Christians commended
- 200 Exhortation to patience and perseverance

== 3:33 The family of Imran ==
The chapter takes its name from the family of Imran mentioned in verse 3:33.

According to Christian tradition, Joachim is the husband of Saint Anne and the father of Mary, mother of Jesus. As there is sparse evidence for Joachim being the name for the father of Mary, the Quranic account possibly alludes to the pun of Miriam, the daughter of Amram and sister of Aaron, for whom Muslim tradition believes Mary is named after. It also serves as a common focal point for Jewish and Christian audiences.

According to Iraqi Jewish translator, N.J. Dawood, the Quran confuses Mary the mother of Jesus with Mary the sister of Moses by referring to the former's father as Imran, which is the Arabic version of Amram, who, in Exodus 6:20, is shown to be the father of Moses. Dawood, in a note to Surah 19:28, where Mary the mother of Jesus is referred to as the "Sister of Aaron" (Aaron was the brother of Mary sister of Moses) states: "It appears that Miriam, Aaron's sister, and Maryam (Mary), mother of Jesus, were according to the Quran, the same person." Although Islamic studies of the beginning of the 20th century tended to note genealogical discrepancies, in more recent Islamic studies of the 21st century the general consensus is, according to Angelika Neuwirth, Nicolai Sinai and Michael Marx, that the Quran does not make a genealogical error but instead makes use of typology. This is, following Wensinck's conclusion, supported by the figurative speech of the Quran and the Islamic tradition:

Maryam is called a sister of Hārūn, and the use of these three names ‘Imrān, Hārūn, and Maryam has led to the supposition that the Qur'ān does not clearly distinguish between the two Maryams, of the Old and the New Testaments. ... It is not necessary to assume that these kinship links are to be interpreted in modern terms. The words "sister" and "daughter", like their male counterparts, in Arabic usage, can indicate extended kinship, descendance or spiritual affinity. ... Muslim tradition is clear that there are eighteen centuries between the Biblical ‘Amram and the father of Maryam.

Similarly, Stowasser concludes that "to confuse Mary the mother of Jesus with Mary the sister of Moses and Aaron in Torah is completely wrong and in contradiction to the sound Hadith and the Qur'anic text as we have established". Rather it serves as a pun for the name Miriam, daughter of Amram and the sister of Aaron, venerated for helping to save her brother Moses as an infant. According to Muslim tradition, she serves as the forebearer of that name for Mary, mother of Jesus.

This matter has been explained in the following Hadith:

Mughira ibn Shu’ba reported: When I came to Najran, they (the Christians of Najran) asked me: You read" O sister of Harun" (i. e. Hadrat Maryam) in the Qur'an, whereas Moses was born much before Jesus. When I came back to Allah's Messenger, peace and blessings be upon him, I asked him about that, whereupon he said: The (people of the old age) used to give names (to their persons) after the names of Apostles and pious persons who had gone before them.

— Sahih Muslim 2135

Ibn Kathir (d.1373) also commented on this in his Quranic exegesis (tafsir), recalling the Arab tradition of addressing a person as the brother or sister of their notable ancestor:

"This is similar to the saying, `O brother of Tamim,' to one who is from the Tamimi tribe, and `O brother of Mudar,' to one who is from the Mudari tribe."

— Tafsir Ibn Kathir 19:28

== Appendix ==
=== Bibliography ===
- al-'Asqalani, Ibn Hajar (1500). "Explanation of Fath al-Bari". Islamweb.
- Bin Al-Hassan, Abi Al-Qasim Ali; Al-Dimashqi, Ibn Asaker (2012). تاريخ مدينة دمشق 1-37 ج10 [History of the city of Damascus]. Dar Al Kotob Al Ilmiyah دار الكتب العلمية.
- Rizqullah Ahmad, Mahdi; Maftukhin, Anis; Basyaruddin, Yessi H. M. (2017). Biografi Rasulullah Sebuah Studi Analitis Berdasarkan Sumber-sumber yang Otentik. Qisthi Press. ISBN 9789793715568.
- Abasoomar, Moulana Muhammad; Abasoomar, Moulana Haroon (2016). "Virtue of Sayyiduna Zubayr (radiyallahu 'anhu)". Hadith Answers. Darul Hadith.
- Rizqullah, Ahmad Mahdi (2005). A Biography of the Prophet of Islam In the Light of the Original Sources, an Analytical Study · Volume 1. Darussalam Publishers. p. 410. ISBN 9789960969022.
