= Maryam (surah) =

19th chapter of the Qur'an

Surah 19 of the Quran
مريم Maryam Mary
- Qira'ah; English text
- Classification: Meccan
- Position: Juzʼ 16
- Hizb no.: 31
- No. of verses: 98
- No. of Rukus: 6
- No. of Sajdahs: 1 (Ayah 58)
- No. of words: 972
- No. of letters: 3835

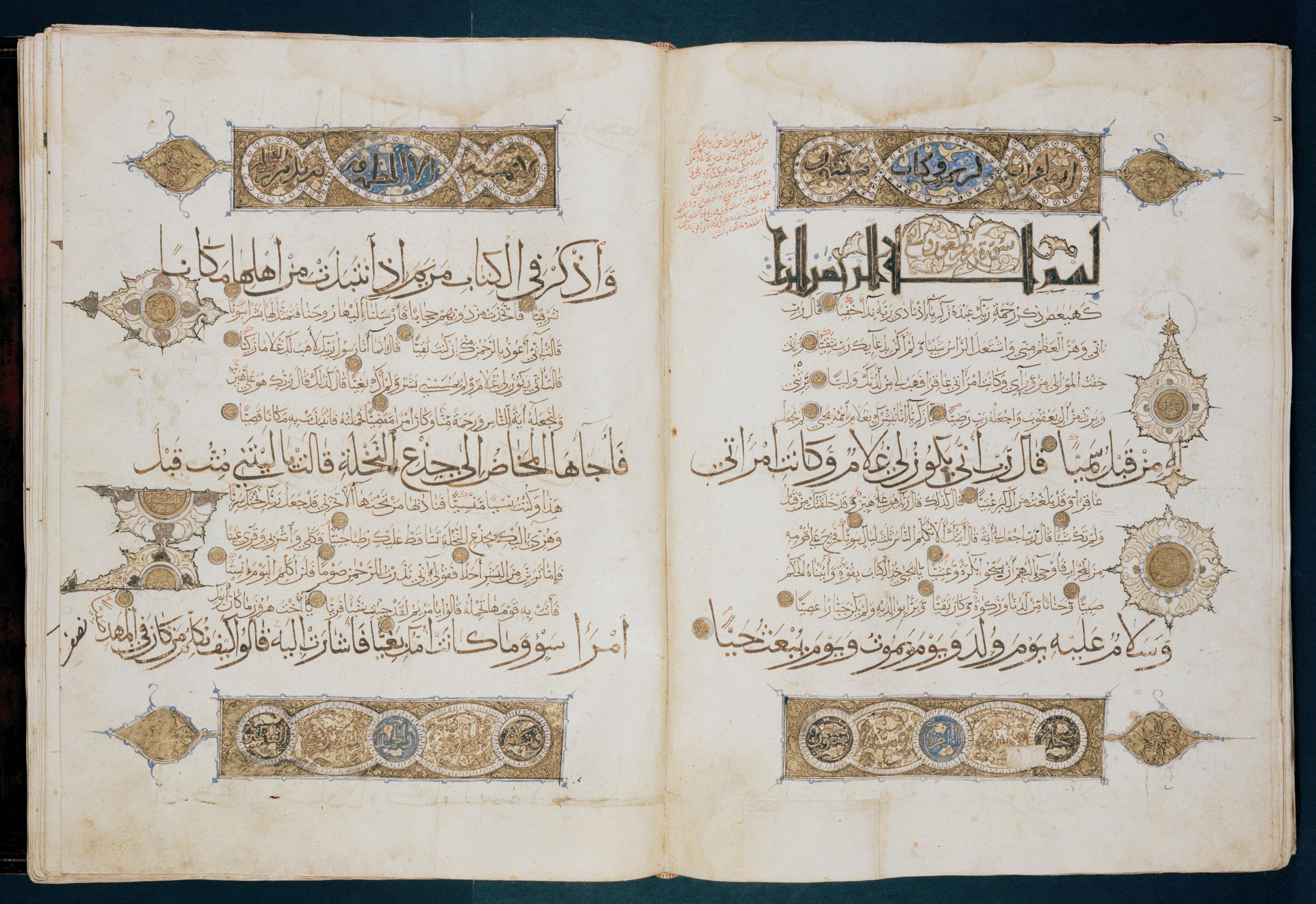
Double-page from the Qur'an with chapter heading and first twenty nine verses of surah Maryam. This spread marking the middle of the text also has elaborate decorative panels with Qur'anic passages at the top and bottom. Iran, 1186. Chester Beatty Library.

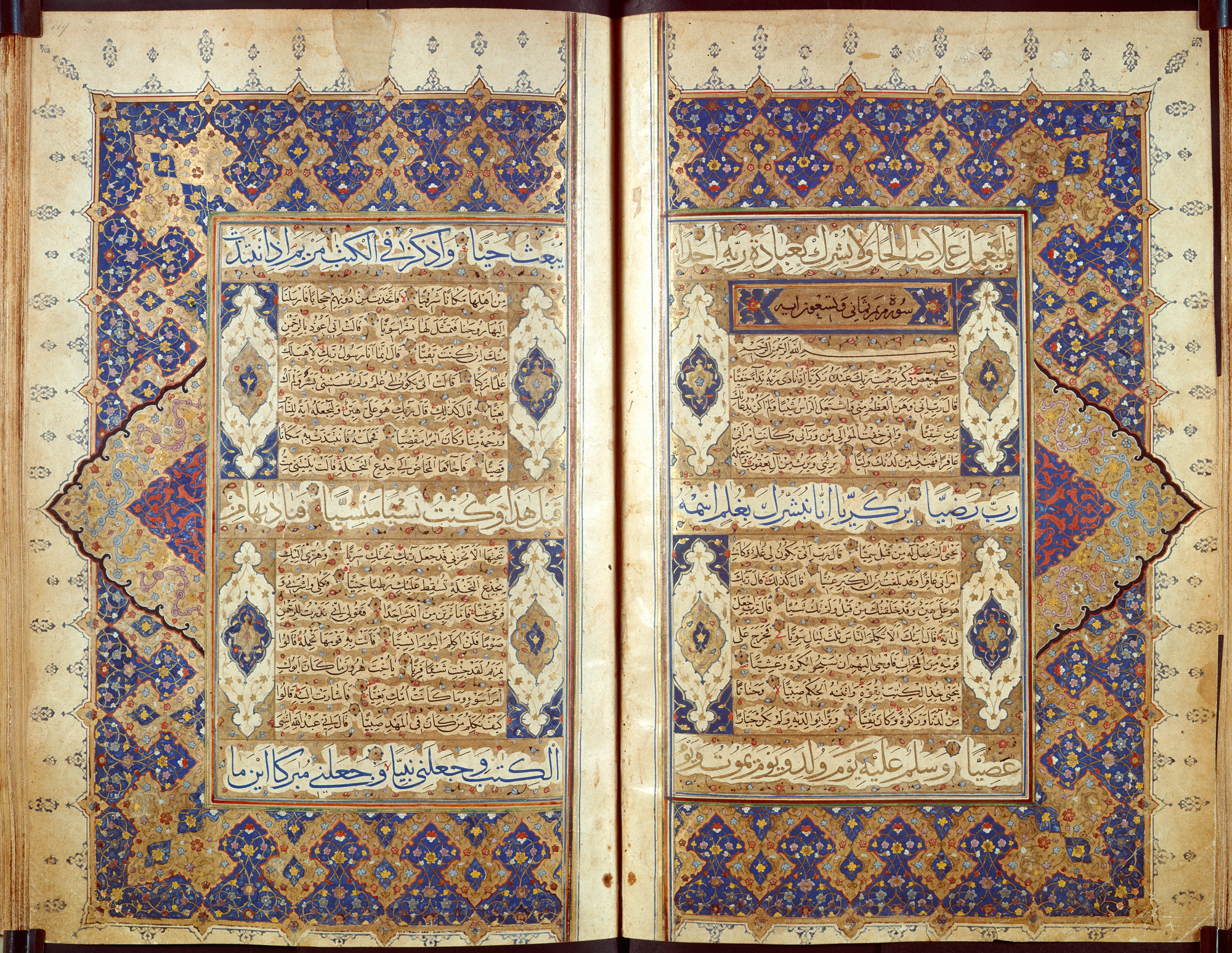
Qur'an made for emperor Akbar with chapter heading and first thirty-one verses of sura Maryam. Lahore, 1573/1574. British Library

Maryam (Arabic: مريم, Maryam; Arabic cognate of 'Mary') is the 19th chapter (sūrah) of the Qur'an with 98 verses (āyāt). The 114 chapters in the Quran are roughly ordered by size. The Quranic chapter is named after Mary, mother of Jesus (ʿIsa, عیسی), and the Virgin Mary in Christian belief. It recounts the events leading up to the birth of Jesus. The text of the surah refers to many known prophetic figures, including Isaac, Jacob, Moses, Aaron, Ishmael, Idris, Adam, Zechariah and Noah.

The Birmingham Quran manuscript preserves the final eight verses (Q19:91–98), on parchment radiocarbon dated to between 568 and 645 CE (56 BH – 25 AH). The Sanaa manuscript, dated between 578 and 669 CE (44 BH – 49 AH), includes verses 2–28.

From the perspective of Islamic tradition, (asbāb al-nuzūl, أسباب النزول), it is an earlier "Meccan Surah", believed to have been revealed sooner than the later revelations in Medina. Theodor Nöldeke's chronology identifies this Surah as the 58th Surah delivered. Traditional Egyptian chronology places it as the 44th.

== Summary ==
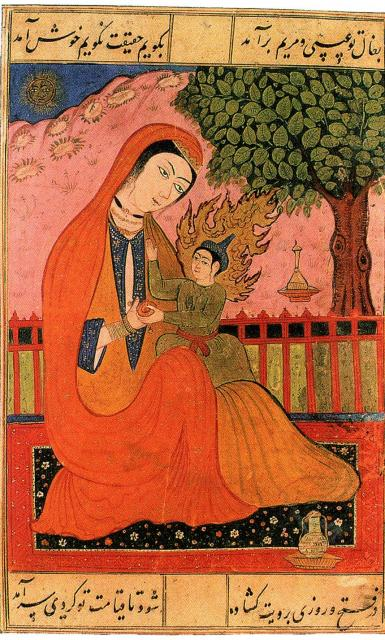
Mary and Jesus in a Persian miniature

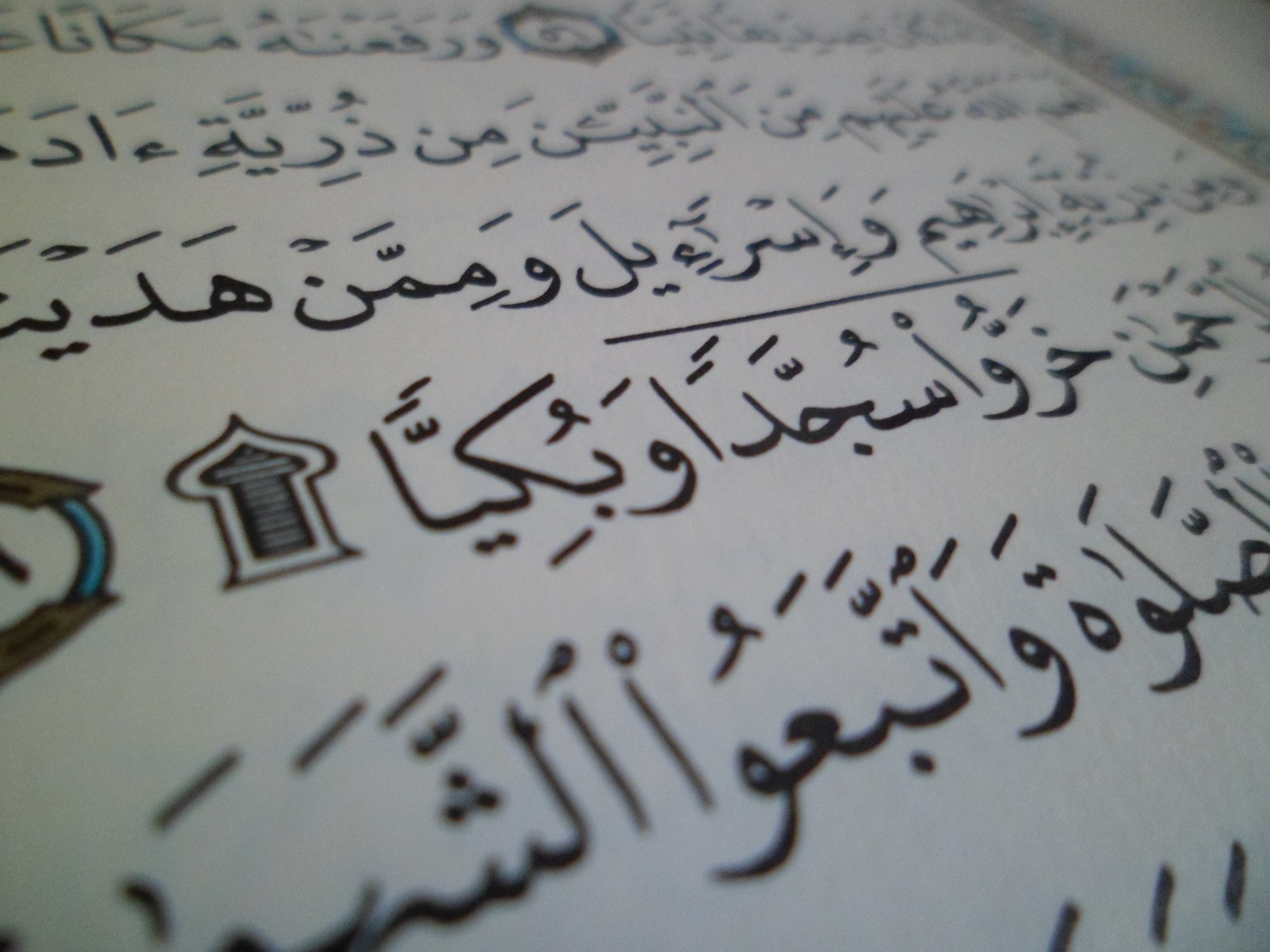
۩ verse 58 in Q19 Maryam

- 1–6 Zechariah prays for offspring
- 7–8 Gabriel is sent with an answer promising a son
- 9–12 Zechariah asks a sign which is given
- 13–15 John the Baptist's mission and character described
- 16–22 Story of Mary's miraculous conception
- 22–23 The birth of Jesus
- 23–27 Mary in distress is comforted by Jesus 28–29 Mary brings her child to her people, who reproach her 30–34 Jesus (speaking in infancy) vindicates his mother and describes his own prophetic character 35 Jesus the Word of Truth
- 36 God has no son 37 God alone to be worshipped
- 38–41 The miserable fate of Jewish and Christian sectaries
- The story of Abraham:
  - 42–46 He reproaches his father for idolatry
  - 47 His father threatens to stone him
  - 48–50 Abraham prays for his father, but separates himself from him
  - 50–51 God gives him Isaac and Jacob, who were notable prophets
- 52 Moses—an apostle and prophet
- 53 Discourses with God privately
- 54 Aaron given him for an assistant
- 55–56 Ismaíl was a prophet acceptable to his Lord
- 57 ۩ 58 Idris was taken up to heaven
- 59 God is bounteous to all true prophets
- 59, 60 The followers of former prophets compared with those of Muhammad
- 61–63 The reward of the faithful in Paradise
- 64 Gabriel comes down from heaven only when commanded
- 65 God is the only Lord—no name like his
- 66–67 The dead shall surely rise
- 68–72 The dead shall be judged on their knees
- 73–75 Believers and unbelievers compared
- 75–76 The prosperity of disbelievers a sign of God's reprobation
- 77–78 Good works better than riches
- 79–83 The doom of the wicked certain
- 84–85 Even the false gods will desert idolaters on judgment day
- 86–87 God sends devils to incite disbelievers to sin
- 88–92 Attributing children to God a great sin
- 93–95 God the only Lord—all creatures His servants
- 96 Believers to be rewarded with love
- 97 The Quran made easy for Muhammad
- 98 Miserable doom of all God's enemies

== 1 The "mysterious letters" ==
The chapter opens with the Bismillah and the "mysterious letters," or muqattaʿat: Kaf; Ha; Ya; 'Ayn; and Sad. Muslims believe these letters to be the peculiar marks of the Quran, and to conceal several profound mysteries, the certain understanding of which has not been communicated to any mortal except for Muhammad.

The remaining 97 verses may be divided many ways.

== 16–30 Story of Maryam ==
Q19:16–30 Translator George Sale was a solicitor and early member of the Society for Promoting Christian Knowledge. His verse structure differs slightly from that of the later Arabic King Faud I Edition. He interprets al-kitab as "the book of the Koran" when he translates the Story of Mary in the Quran

And remember in the book of the Koran the story of Mary; when she retired from her family to a place towards the east, (Note: p viz., To the eastern part of the temple; or to a private chamber in the house, which opened to the east: whence, says Baidawi, the Christians pray towards that quarter. (There is a tradition, that when the virgin was grown to years of puberty, she used to leave her apartment in the temple, and retire to Zacharias's house to her aunt, when her courses came upon her; and so soon as she was clean, she returned again to the temple: and that at the time of the angel's visiting her, she was at her aunt's on the like occasion, and was sitting to wash herself, in an open place, behind a veil to prevent her being seen. But others more prudently suppose the design of her retirement was to pray.) and took a veil to conceal herself from them; and we sent our spirit Gabriel unto her, and he appeared unto her in the shape of a perfect man. (Note: q Like a full-grown but beardless youth. Baidawi, not contented with having given one good reason why he appeared in that form, viz., to moderate her surprise, that she might hear his message with less shyness, adds, that perhaps it might be to raise an emotion in her, and assist her conception.)
۝ (Note: Arabic script in Unicode symbol for a Quran verse, U+06DD, page 3, Proposal for additional Unicode characters.) 20 She said, I fly for refuge unto the merciful God, that he may defend me from thee: if thou fearest him, thou wilt not approach me.
He answered, Verily I am the messenger of thy LORD, and am sent to give thee a holy son.
She said, How shall I have a son, seeing a man hath not touched me, and I am no harlot?
Gabriel replied, So shall it be: thy LORD saith, This is easy with me; and we will perform it, that we may ordain him for a sign unto men, and a mercy from us: for it is a thing which is decreed.
۞ Wherefore she conceived him; (Note: r For Gabriel blew into the bosom of her shift, which he opened with his fingers, and his breath reaching her womb, caused the conception. The age of the Virgin Mary at the time of her conception was thirteen, or, as others say, ten; and she went six, seven, eight, or nine months with him, according to different traditions; though some say the child was conceived at its full growth of nine months, and that she was delivered of him within an hour after.) and she retired aside with him in her womb to a distant place; (Note: s To conceal her delivery, she went out of the city by night, to a certain mountain.) and the pains of child-birth came upon her near the trunk of a palm-tree. (Note: t The palm to which she fled, that she might lean on it in her travail, was a withered trunk, without any head or verdure, and this happened in the winter season; notwithstanding which it miraculously supplied her with fruits for her refreshment; as is mentioned immediately. It has been observed, that the Mohammedan account of the delivery of the Virgin Mary very much resembles that of Latona, as described by the poets, not only in this circumstance of their laying hold on a palm-tree (though some say Latona embraced an olive-tree, or an olive and a palm, or else two laurels), but also in that of their infants speaking; which Apollo is fabled to have done in the womb.9) She said, Would to GOD I had died :before this, and had become a thing forgotten, and lost in oblivion.
And he who was beneath her called to her, (Note: u This some imagine to have been the child himself; but others suppose it was Gabriel who stood somewhat lower than she did. According to a different reading this passage may be rendered, And he called to her from beneath her, &c. And some refer the pronoun, translated her, to the palm-tree; and then it should be beneath it, &c.) saying, be not grieved; now hath GOD provided a stream under thee;
and do thou shake the body of the palm-tree, and it shall let fall ripe dates upon thee ready gathered. (Note: x And accordingly she had no sooner spoken it than the dry trunk revived, and shot forth green leaves, and a head loaded with ripe fruit.) And eat, and drink, and calm thy mind. (Note: y Literally, thine eye.) Moreover, if thou see any man, and he question thee, say, Verily I have vowed a fast unto the Merciful: wherefore I will by no means speak to a man this day. (Note: z During which she was not to speak to anybody, unless to acquaint them with the reason of her silence: and some suppose she did that by signs.)
So she brought the child to her people, carrying him in her arms. And they said unto her, O Mary, now hast thou done a strange thing: O sister of Aaron, thy father was not a bad man, neither was thy mother a harlot.
۝30 But she made signs unto the child to answer them; and they said, How shall we speak to him, who is an infant in the cradle?
Whereupon the child said, Verily I am the servant of GOD.; (Note: b These were the first words which were put into the mouth of JESUS, to obviate the imagination of his partaking of the divine nature, or having a right to the worship of mankind, on account of his miraculous speaking so soon after his birth.) he hath given me the book of the gospel, and hath appointed me a prophet.

== 2–40 Jesus ==
The first section, verses 2–40, begins with the story of Prophet Zachariah and the birth of his son John, the story of Mary and the birth of her son Jesus, and a commentary on Jesus' identity according to Islam which rejects the Christian claim that he is God's son.

=== 28 Sister of Aaron ===
In Q19:28, she is referred to as 'Sister of Aaron'. Several occurrences of the word "أخ" are found in the Quran when referring to kinship or sharing the same ancestor. According to authentic Hadith, a Christian from Najran did inquire about the verse, to which Muhammad replied:

"They used to name their children after the prophets and the righteous who came before them."

Being the namesake of prophetess Miriam, the verse links Mary to Aaron specifically instead of Moses, who himself is a key figure in the Quran. According to Sahih International, the Arabic wording implies a descendancy of Aaron:

"O sister [i.e. descendant] of Aaron, your father was not a man of evil, nor was your mother unchaste."

While Mary's genealogy is unknown in the Bible, her relative Elizabeth was a descendant of Aaron. Orientalist George Sale writes:

"Several Christian writers think the Quran stands convicted of a manifest falsehood in this particular, but I am afraid the Muslims may avoid the charge; as they do by several answers. Some say the Virgin Mary had really a brother named Aaron, who had the same father, but a different mother; others suppose Aaron the brother of Moses is here meant, but say Mary is called his sister, either because she was of the Levitical race (as by her being related to Elizabeth, it should seem she was), or by way of comparison; others say that it was a different person of that name who was contemporary with her, and conspicuous for his good or bad qualities, and that they likened her to him either by way of commendation or of reproach."

=== Rhyme structures ===
In its original Arabic, the text of chapter 19 progresses through a series of varying rhyme structures that correspond to the content being discussed. Throughout the initial narration of the stories of Zachariah and John, Mary and Jesus, and other prophets, verses rhyme based on the syllable 'ya'. When the text moves on to a commentary on the true identity of Jesus, words rhyme due to a long 'ee' or 'oo' preceding a nasal 'm' or 'n', which is considered to give an air of settledness or finality to the subjects being discussed. The first rhyme scheme is then resumed during further accounts of earlier prophets and changes to a rhyme based on a medium 'a' following a voiced 'd' when the Surah discusses punishments for those who reject truth and the prophets. The strength of this vocalization is exchanged for the stronger still double 'd' sound when denouncing unbelievers for their criticism.

=== 2–28 Sanaa 1 ===
The sequence of the Sanaa manuscript (Sanaa 1) chapters do not follow any other known quranic order and folio 22 is shared with Chapter 9 (al-Tawbah) (Q9:122-129).

==== Recto ====
Location	Visible Traces	Reconstruction	Standard Text
Quran 19:2 Line 24	ر ﺣ[ـﻤ]ﻪ	رَحْمَةِ "mercy"	رَحْمَتِ "have mercy"
Quran 19:3 Line 25	ا د ٮا د ی ر ٮک ر ﻛ[ـر] ٮا	إِذْ نَادَىٰ رَبَّــكَ زَكَرِيَّا "When your Lord called Zechariah"	إِذْ نَادَىٰ رَبَّــهُ "When his Lord called"
Quran 19:4 Line 25	و ٯل ر ٮی	وَقٰلَ رَبِّــي "And my Lord said"	قالَ رَبِّ "God said"
Quran 19:4 Line 26	و ٯل ر ٮی ا سٮعل ا لر ا س سٮٮا	And my Lord said: “Let the head be young.” وَقٰلَ رَبِّي ٱشْتَعَلَ ٱلرَّأْسُ شَيْباً	قَالَ رَبِّ إِنِّي وَهَنَ ٱلْعَظْمُ مِنِّي وَٱشْتَعَلَ ٱلرَّأْسُ شَيْبًا The Lord said that while they were greater than me, the head was young
Quran 19:4 Line 26	و لم ا کں ر ٮ ٮـ(ـد) عا ک	وَلَمْ أَکُنْ رَبِّ بِدُعَاءِكَ "And I was not a lord by your supplication"	وَلَمْ أَكُن بِدُعَائِكَ رَبِّ "And I was not called by your Lord"
Quran 19:5 Line 27	و ﺣ(ڡـ)ـٮ ا لمو ل مں و [ر] ا ی	"I feared my mind" وَ خِفْتُ ٱلْمَوَٰل مِن وَرٰاءِى	وَإِنِّى خِفْتُ ٱلْمَوَٰلِىَ مِن وَرٰاءِى "And I have eased my mind from behind me"

=== 34 Significance of Mary ===
Chapter 19 is the only surah in the Qur'an that is named after a woman, initially known as KA-HA. Mary, the figure from whom this Surah takes its name. Jesus is referred to by his familial connection to her in Q19:34, the identifying title 'son of Mary' places startling emphasis on Mary's motherhood in a culture in which individuals were identified by their descent from male family member. This emphasis draws attention to the unique circumstances of Jesus's birth; it was a miraculous moment that confirmed biological power of Mary only, because no male (human being) was needed. However, the narrative rejects the Christian belief that he Jesus is living and breathing God. The text describes the agony of Mary's childbirth in great detail, including her wish that she had died long ago in order to avoid such pain. Despite this great hardship, God is portrayed as compassionate and attentive to Mary's needs; He urges her not to worry and provides her with food. Feminist reading of the text points to this treatment of childbirth as verification of the process's special significance.

Other scholars point to the interaction between Mary and the angel Gabriel as indicative of traditional gender roles at the time; when Mary, a solitary female, encounters the male angel, her first reaction is fear of the impropriety of the situation and uncertainty regarding the angel's intentions. She can hear the angel's message and question him only after he assures her that he has come as a messenger from God.

Maryam in Syriac (ܡܪܝܡ) is a common adjective connoting blessing and perhaps the verb "[God] exalts her".

=== 35–37 Dome of the Rock ===
The verses from Maryam 19:35–37, which are seen by Muslims as strongly reaffirming Jesus' prophethood to God, are quoted in inscriptions in the oldest extant Islamic monument, The Dome of the Rock in Jerusalem.

== 41–65 Abraham ==
The second section, verses 41–65, tells of Abraham's departure from his family's idolatrous ways and then refers to many other prophets. The text discusses the various responses of those who heard their prophecy and the fates those hearers met; throughout these descriptions, the oneness of God is emphasized.

== 66–98 Islamic view of the Trinity ==
The third section, verses 66–98, confirms the reality of resurrection and offers depictions of the Day of Judgment alongside depictions of this life.

=== 91–98 Birmingham manuscript ===
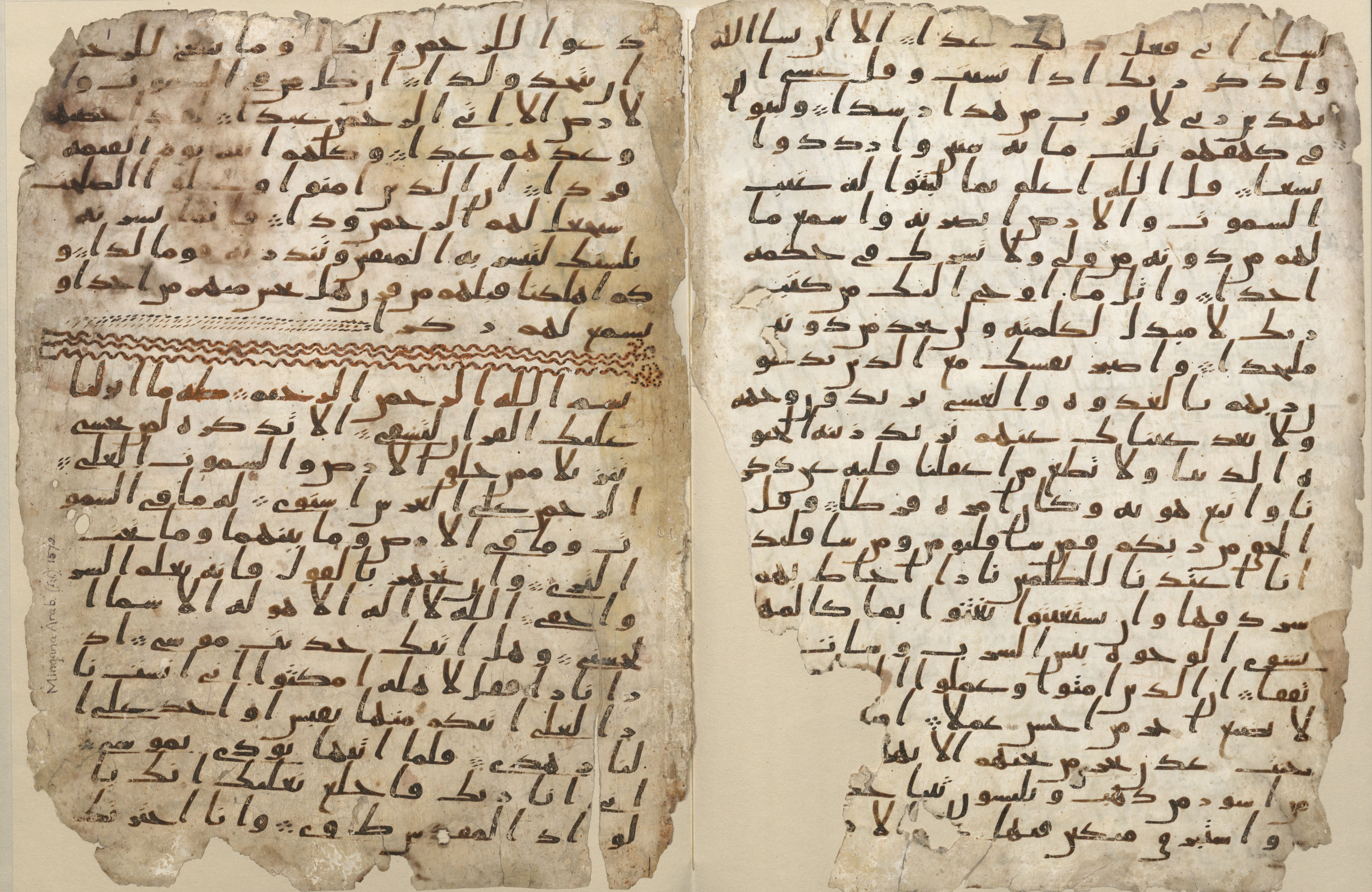
folio 1 verso (right) and folio 2 recto (left); Q19:91–98 above triple line

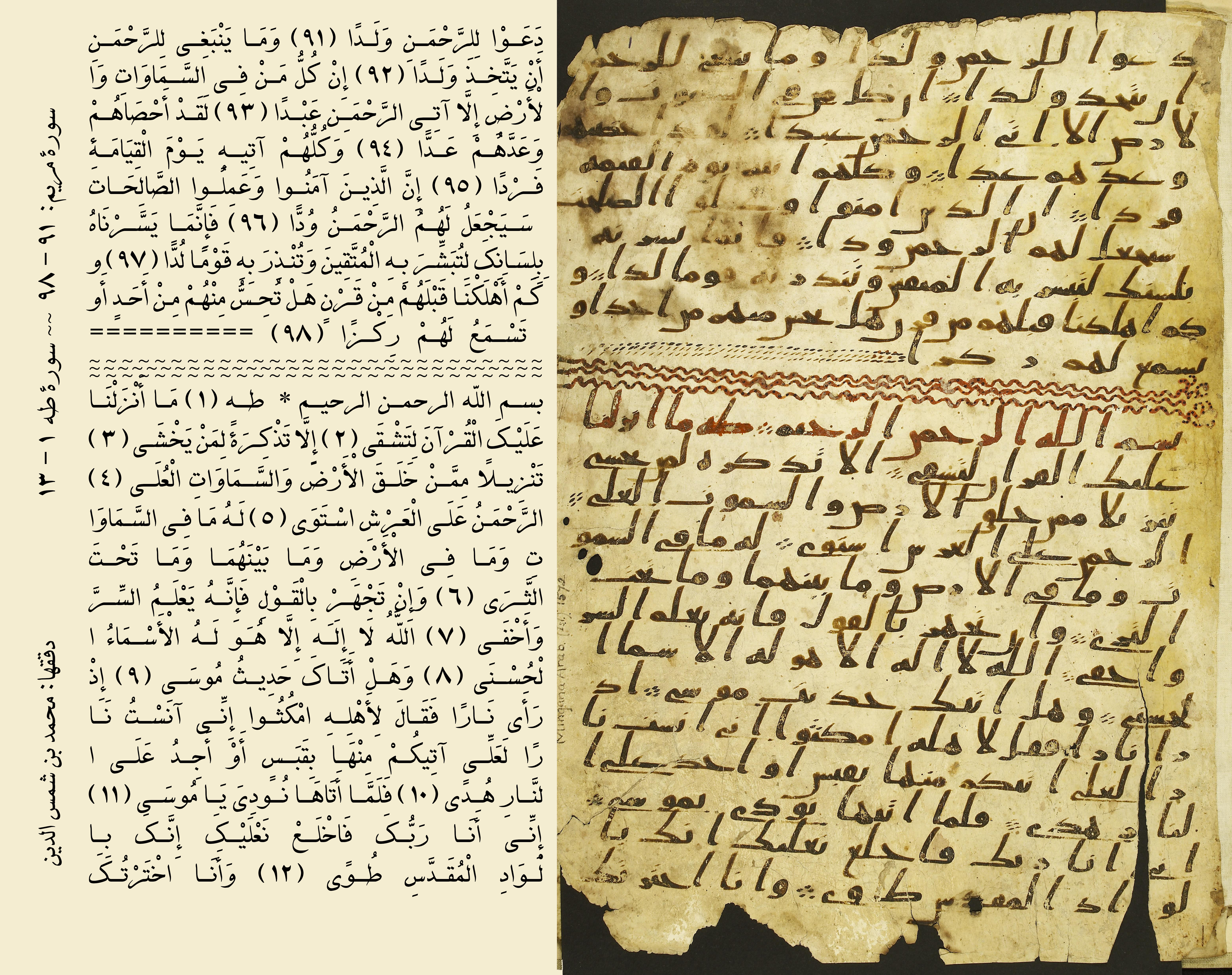
Comparison of a 21st-century Quran (left) and the Birmingham Quran manuscript; Q20:1–11 below triple line

The Birmingham Quran manuscript preserves the final eight verses (Q19:91–98) of Chapter 19, Maryam (plus parts of Chapter 18, Al-Kahf; and Chapter 20, "Taha"). Located in the Cadbury Research Library, It is written in the Arabic language in Hijazi script by unknown scribe(s).

The Manuscript has been radiocarbon dated to between 568 and 645 CE (in the Islamic calendar, between 56 BH and 25 AH). Saud al-Sarhan, Director of Center for Research and Islamic Studies in Riyadh, considers that the parchment might in fact have been reused as a palimpsest. Saud's perspective has been backed by a number of Saudi-based experts in Quranic history who deny that the Birmingham/Paris Quran could have been written during the lifetime of Muhammad. They emphasize that while Muhammad was alive, Quranic texts were written without any chapter decoration, marked verse endings or use of colored inks, and did not follow any standard sequence of surahs. They maintain that those features were introduced into Quranic practice in the time of the Caliph Uthman, and so it would be entirely possible that the Birmingham leaves could have been written then, but not earlier.

Q19:91–92 dissents from the Trinitarian Christian practice of calling upon God in the name of his ‘son’. ^{91}That they attribute to the Most Merciful a son. ^{92}And it is not appropriate for the Most Merciful that He should take a son. Q19:96 supports a requirement for "Faith and deeds" ^{96}Indeed, those who have believed and done righteous deeds – the Most Merciful will appoint for them affection.

== Notes ==
The notes are mostly by Sale who in turn relied heavily on Lewis Maracci's Latin translation. Maracci was a Roman Catholic cleric regular of the Mother of God of Lucca:
