= Louis Rieu =

Sir Jean Louis Rieu, KCSI
- Born: 23 November 1872
- Died: 4 November 1964 (aged 91)
- Occupation: British administrator in India

Sir Jean Louis Rieu, KCSI (23 November 1872 – 4 November 1964) was a British administrator in India. A member of the Indian Civil Service, he held various appointments in the Bombay Presidency, including service as Commissioner in Sind from 1919 to 1925.

== Biography ==
Louis Rieu was the son of Charles Pierre Henri Rieu, a Swiss-born orientalist who spent his career in Britain and the grandson of the Swiss soldier and politician Jean-Louis Rieu; his brother was the classicist E. V. Rieu. He was educated at University College School, London, and Balliol College, Oxford.

He entered the ICS in 1893 and was posted to the Bombay Presidency. He served successively as assistant collector, collector, and in other capacities in Sind until 1911, when he was appointed Secretary to the Government of Bombay in the General Department. In 1917, he was appointed Collector of Karachi, and in 1918 he became Secretary to the Government of Bombay in the Revenue and Financial Departments. He was Commissioner in Sind from 1915 to 1925, and served on the Executive Council of the Governor of Bombay from 1926 until his retirement in 1929 as member responsible for revenue, in succession to Sir Maurice Hayward. He was replaced by Walter Frank Hudson.

Rieu was appointed CSI in 1920 and promoted to KCSI in 1929.

== Family ==
Rieu was married firstly to Ida Augusta Edwards (died 1921), daughter of John Edwards, JP, of Knockrobin, County Wicklow; they had a daughter, Myra Julie. He married secondly Eileen Dorothy Kirkpatrick, daughter of Cyril Kirkpatrick, in 1930. Kirkpatrick had been married to Charles William Aldis Turner, ICS, who obtained a divorce decree against his wife on grounds of adultery earlier that year, citing Rieu as co-respondent.
