= Mary in Islam =

Islamic view of Mary, mother of Jesus

Maryam
- مريم; Mary
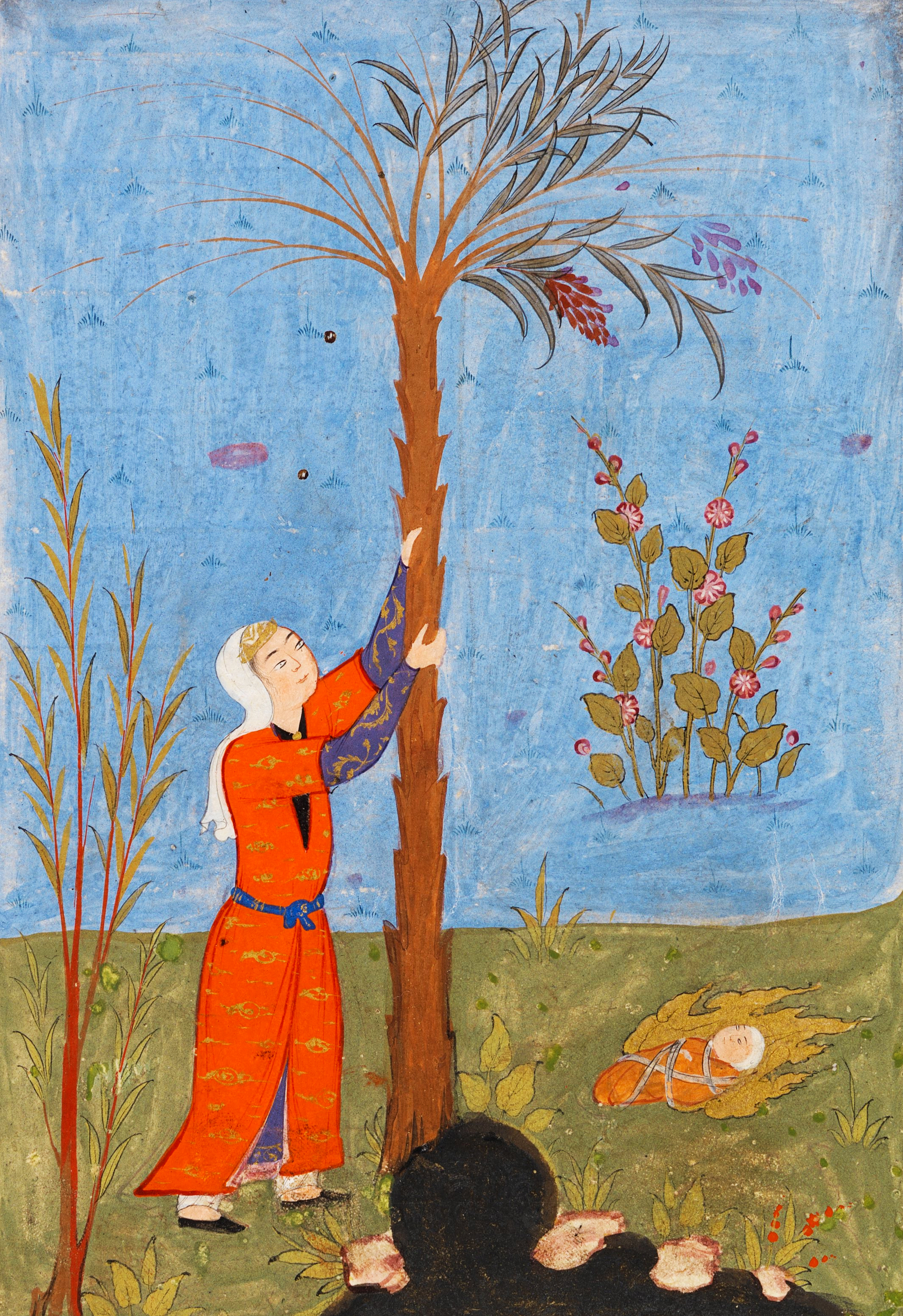
- Quranic nativity: Maryam (left) in labor shaking the date palm, with baby Isa (right) and hidden voice below

Personal life
- Born: Maryam bint Imran c. 20 BCE Nazareth
- Died: c. 100–120 CE Jerusalem
- Resting place: Mary's Tomb, Kidron Valley (traditional)
- Children: Isa
- Parents: Imran (father); Anne (mother)

Religious life
- Religion: Islam

Maryam bint Imran (Arabic: مريم بنت عمران, lit. 'Mary, daughter of Imran') holds a singularly exalted place in Islam. The Quran refers to her seventy times and explicitly identifies her as the greatest woman to have ever lived. Moreover, she is the only woman referenced by name in the Quran. In the Quran, her story is related in three Meccan surahs (19, 21, 23) and four Medinan surahs (3, 4, 5, 66). The nineteenth Surah, Maryam, is named after her.

According to the Quran, Mary's parents had been praying for a child. Their request was eventually accepted by God, and Mary's mother became pregnant. Her father Imran had died before the child was born. After her birth, she was taken care of by her maternal uncle Zechariah, a priest in the Temple. According to the Quran, Mary received messages from God through the archangel Gabriel. God informed Mary that she had miraculously conceived a child through the intervention of the divine spirit, though she was still a virgin. The name of her child, Jesus, was chosen by God—he was to be the Christ, the Promised Messiah in Islam. As such, orthodox Islamic belief has upheld the virgin birth of Jesus, and although the classical Islamic thinkers never dwelt on the question of the perpetual virginity of Mary, it was generally agreed in traditional Islam that Mary remained a virgin throughout her life, with the Quran's mention of Mary's purification “from the touch of men” implying perpetual virginity in the minds of many of the most prominent Islamic fathers. Mary is believed to have been chosen by God, above all "the women of the worlds" in Islam and is considered as one of the four "ladies of heaven" alongside Fatima, Asiya, the wife of the Pharaoh, and Khadija, the first wife of Muhammad.

Modern scholarship often treats Christian apocryphal traditions mainly extant in the Gospel of James, and a later reworking of the same text called the Gospel of Pseudo-Matthew, as intertexts of the Quranic account of Mary's life.

== Family ==
Mary's relation to John and Zechariah according to traditional readings of the Quran

The Quran calls Mary, Arabic: مريم إبنت عمران, romanized: Maryam ibnat ʿImrān, lit. 'Mary daughter of Imran', not to be confused with Arabic: عمران, romanized: ʿImrān, lit. 'Amram' , the father of Miriam and Moses. It also mentions that people called her Arabic: أخت هـٰرون, romanized: Ukht Hārūn, lit. 'Sister of Aaron', not to be confused with Arabic: هـٰرون, romanized: Hārūn, lit. 'Aaron', the brother of Moses and Miriam. Her mother, mentioned in the Quran only as the wife of Imran, prayed for a child and eventually conceived. According to al-Tabari, Mary's mother was named Arabic: حنة, romanized: Ḥanna, lit. 'Anne' and her husband died before the child was born. Expecting the child to be male, Anne vowed to dedicate him to isolation and service in the Temple. However, Anne bore a daughter instead, and named her Mary.

== In the Quran ==
Mary is mentioned frequently in the Quran, and her narrative occurs consistently from the earliest chapters, revealed in Mecca, to the latest verses, revealed in Medina.

=== Birth ===
The birth of Mary is narrated in the Quran with references to her father as well as her mother. Mary's father is called ʿImrān in Arabic. Her mother, according to al-Tabari, is called Anne, which is the same name as in the Gospel of James. Muslim literature narrates that Imran and his wife were old and childless and that, one day, the sight of a bird in a tree feeding her young aroused Anne's desire for a child. She prayed to God to fulfill her desire and vowed, if her prayer was accepted, that her child would be dedicated to the service of God.

E.H. Palmer, in his late 19th-century translation of the Quran, included in the Sacred Books of the East series, noted that:

Amram; who, according to the Mohammedans, was the father of the Virgin Mary, (Miriam.) A confusion seems to have existed in the mind of Mohammed between Miriam 'the Virgin Mary,' and Miriam the sister of Moses.

This view was further corroborated in the 20th century. According to N.J. Dawood, the Quran confuses Mary, mother of Jesus with Miriam, sister of Moses, when it refers to the father of Mary as Imran, which is the Arabic version of Amram, who is shown to be the father of Moses in Exodus 6:20. Dawood, in a note to Quran 19:28, where Mary is referred to as the "Sister of Aaron", and Aaron was the brother of Miriam, states: "It appears that Miriam, Aaron's sister, and Maryam (Mary), mother of Jesus, were according to the Koran, one and the same person." In the 21st century this view remains common in Islamic studies, for example in Gabriel Said Reynolds' work.

More recent scholarship by Angelika Neuwirth has argued that far from a genealogical mistake, the Quranic account is to be understood two-fold, first as a Meccan telling (Surat al-Maryam) and later a politicized Medinan retelling (Surat al-Imran) of the same account—in its second form being a theological response to Christian objections to the initial Quranic account by incorporating polysemy found in Medinian Judaism. In her view the accounts draw on Christian traditions preserved in Byzantine hymns (Note: In addition to the usual traditions of the apocryphal intertexts identified) as sources. The complexities navigated by the accounts are mainly related to the patriarchal authority of the House of Abraham and the Quran's apocryphal adoption of the possibly competing House of Imran defined by its female members, as well as an adoption of a general concept of the Holy Family. The ultimate solution of the retelling process was an account which allowed prophetic revelation surrounding motherhood and scripture—which the Christian tradition attributes to Mary—to be recast as Arabic: أمّ الکتاب, romanized: Umm al-Kitab, lit. 'Mother of Scripture' originating with Muhammad, with the Abrahamic prophetic lineage also being moved from the Holy Family to Muhammad himself. Michael Marx further builds on this analysis and identifies the Quranic account as a retelling of Mary as the Temple from the Christian tradition as Mary in the Temple. Thus, in an attempt to eliminate the allegorical prerogatives of the Christian story to avoid the conclusion of a deified Christ, only traces of pre-Islamic Mariology remain in the text. Such a purposeful deviation from Christian accounts is further supported by Wensinck's argument regarding the figurative speech of the Quran and the Islamic tradition:

Maryam is called a sister of Hārūn and the use of these three names Imrān, Hārūn and Maryam, has led to the supposition that the Kur'ān does not clearly distinguish between the two Maryams of the Old and the New Testaments. It is not necessary to assume that these kinship links are to be interpreted in modern terms. The words "sister" and "daughter", like their male counterparts, in Arabic usage can indicate extended kinship, descendance or spiritual affinity. Muslim tradition is clear that there are eighteen centuries between the Biblical Amram and the father of Maryam.

Similarly, Stowasser concludes that "to confuse Mary the mother of Jesus with Mary the sister of Moses and Aaron in the Torah is completely wrong and in contradiction to the sound Hadith and the Quranic text as we have established".

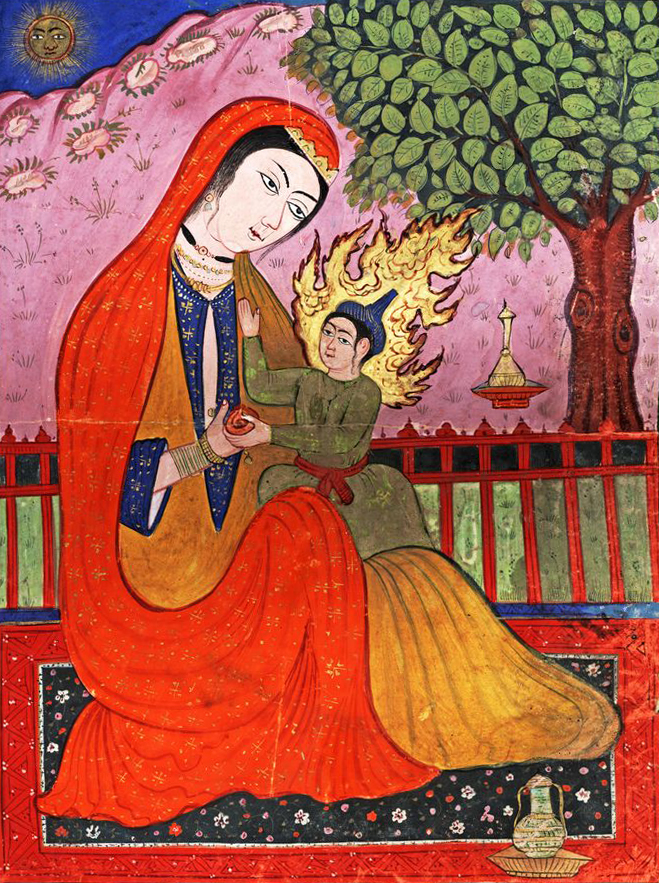
Mary and the infant Jesus from a 16th century Indian manuscript

Despite likely being familiar with narrative traditions represented in the Gospel of James, the Quranic account of Mary's birth does not affirm the Immaculate Conception.

=== Early years ===
As mentioned previously, the Quranic narrative imagines Mary in the Temple, however diverging from the apocryphal Christian version of the Presentation of Mary, which ultimately leads to her being educated as God-Bearer in the Temple and thereby becoming God's new Temple (Note: ie his dwelling place) via the birth of Christ. As said in apocryphal accounts, the Quranic narrative lets her caregiver be decided by the casting of lots. Unlike them it places her in the care of Zechariah, not Joseph. However, much like in the Gospel of James, Zechariah in the Quran is imagined as a high priest. The Quranic narrative also borrows the Gospel of James' idea of Mary being miraculously fed in the Temple, unlike the former it however does not explicitly state that Mary had been fed by angels.

=== Annunciation ===
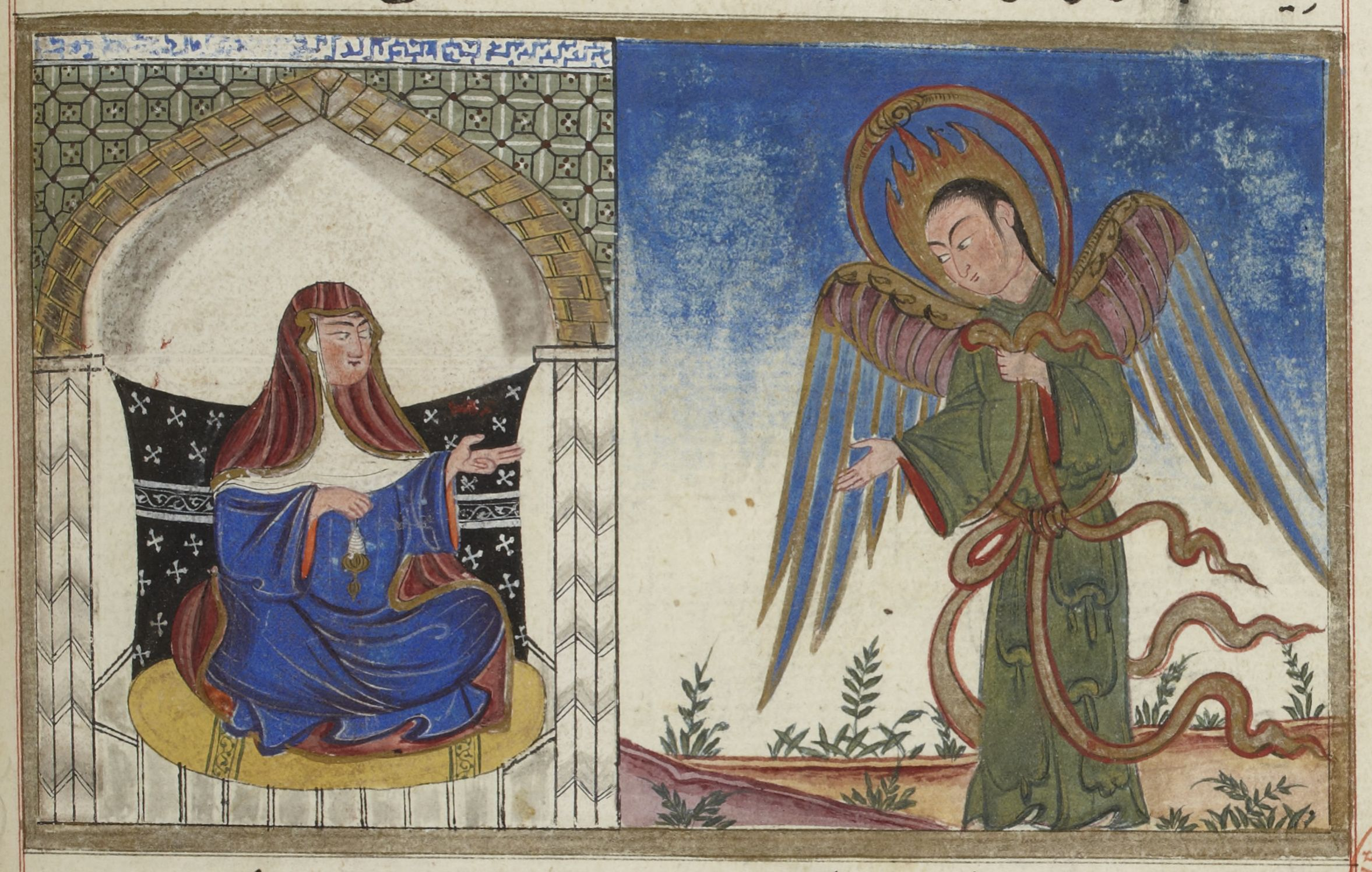
Annunciation in The Remaining Signs of Past Centuries, folio 162v. Bibliothèque nationale de France, Département des manuscrits, Arabe 1489

In the Qurʾān, Mary receives an annunciation and conceives Jesus by God's command in two principal passages: the angels (or a "spirit") tell her she has been chosen to bear a "pure son" (3:42–47; 19:16–22), and conception occurs through God's "breath/Spirit" (21:91; 66:12); Scholars note clear points of contact with the Gospel of Luke—Gabriel’s role, the virginal conception by (the) Spirit, Mary’s question "How can this be?", and the child's naming and destined greatness.

Commentators on the Quran remark on the last verse that Mary was as close to a perfect woman as there could be, and she was devoid of almost all failings. Although Islam honors numerous women, including Hawwa, Hagar, Sarah, Asiya, Khadijah, Fatimah, Aisha, Hafsa many commentators followed this verse in the absolute sense, and agreed that Mary was the greatest woman of all time. Other commentators, however, while maintaining that Mary was the "queen of the saints", interpreted this verse to mean that Mary was the greatest woman of that time and that Fatimah, Khadijah and Asiya were equally great. According to exegesis and literature, Gabriel appeared to Mary, who was still young in age, in the form of a well-made man with a "shining face" and announced to her the birth of Jesus. After her immediate astonishment, she was reassured by the angel's answer that God has the power to do anything.

=== Virgin birth ===
According to the Quran, Mary was chosen twice by God: "And when the angels said, ‘O Mary, God has chosen you and purified you, and He has chosen you above the world’s women." (3:42); and the first choosing was her selection with glad tidings given to Imran. The second was that she became pregnant without a man, so in this regard, she was chosen over all other women in the world.

The Quran narrates the virgin birth of Jesus numerous times. In Surah Maryam, verses (ayat) 17–21, the annunciation is given, followed by the virgin birth in due course. In Islam, Jesus is called the "spirit of God" because he was through the action of the spirit, but that belief does not include the doctrine of his pre-existence, as it does in Christianity. Quran 3:47 also supports the virginity of Mary, revealing that "no man has touched [her]". 66:12 states that Jesus was born when the spirit of God breathed upon Mary, whose body was chaste.

Barbara Regine Freyer Stowasser argues that Islamic scholars believed the Jewish restrictions against women entering the Temple, came down to menstruation, thus the aforementioned Quranic recasting of Mary in the Temple instead of the Christian Mary as the Temple was rationalised with her virginal ritual purity of not having bled.

According to the Quran, the following conversation transpired between the angel Gabriel and Mary when he appeared to her in the form of a man:

19:16 And mention in the Book Mary, when she withdrew from her family to an easterly place,
19:17 Thus did she seclude herself from them, whereupon We sent to her Our Spirit and he became incarnate for her as a perfect human.
19:18 She said, ‘I seek the protection of the All-beneficent from you, should you be Godwary!’
19:19 He said, ‘I am only a messenger of your Lord that I may give you a pure son.’
19:20 She said, ‘How shall I have a child seeing that no human being has ever touched me, nor have I been unchaste?’
19:21 He said, ‘So shall it be. Your Lord says, “It is simple for Me, and so that We may make him a sign for mankind and mercy from Us, and it is a matter [already] decided.”

— Ali Quli Qarai, Surah Maryam 19:16-21

The Qurʾanic birth narrative closely resembles ones found in Christian apocryphal texts, which modern scholars consider the Qurʾanic account to be dependent on. The primary two accounts the Quʾran is thought to recount in some way are found in the Latin Gospel of Pseudo-Matthew which features a Marian date-palm (and spring) miracle in Egypt and the Gospel of James (Note: Which is itself the primary source the Gospel of Pseudo-Matthew reworks.) which features a remote/cave birth narrative. Of additional importance are also the pictorial mosaics found in the Church of the Seat of Mary, which was converted into a mosque and served as the primary architectural inspiration for the Dome of the Rock. These mosaics already display the narrative conflation between the remote birth and the date-palm episode later found in the Quʾran. They thereby likely attest the Palestinian oral tradition recounted by the author of the Quʾran.

In the Qurʾān's nativity account (principally 19:16–36 with echoes in 21:91; 66:12), Mary withdraws "to an easterly place," encounters the divine "spirit" appearing in human form, conceives by God’s command, and—seized by the pains of labor beneath a date-palm—is consoled by a voice that provides water and fruit; returning to her people, she vows silence, points to the infant, and the newborn speaks in defense of his mother and in proclamation of his mission. Framed alongside the story of Zechariah and John (19:2–15 → 19:16–36), this composition echoes Luke's paired sequencing while diverging in setting and dramatis personae: both traditions affirm virginal conception by (the) Spirit and announce the child’s name and destined role, yet Luke situates the birth in Bethlehem with Joseph present and a manger and shepherds (Luke 1–2), whereas the Qurʾān places Mary alone in a remote locale with the palm-tree and rivulet motif differing from Luke in the Quran and the tradition represented by the Gospel of James—similarly the newborn's cradle speech present in Islamic scripture and the Syriac Infancy Gospel is not found in Luke.

More recently Suleiman Ali Mourad began to venture beyond identifying these well-established pre-Islamic Christian intertexts and looking at broader mythological traditions of antiquity. He thereby identified divine birth narratives as general sources and particularly the birth of the Greek god, Apollo, as a prototype for the Quranic account.

== Islamic tradition ==
Mary is one of the most honored figures in Islamic theology, with Muslims viewing her as one of the most righteous women to have lived as per the Quranic verse, with reference to the Angelical salutation during the annunciation, "O Mary, indeed Allāh has chosen you and purified you and chosen you above the women of the worlds.". A minority of Muslims also view her as a prophet.

Muslim tradition, like Christian, honors her memory at Matariyyah near Cairo, and in Jerusalem. Muslims also visit the Bath of Mary in Jerusalem, where Muslim tradition recounts Mary once bathed, and this location was visited at times by women who were seeking a cure for barrenness. Some plants have also been named after Mary, such as Maryammiah, which, as tradition recounts, acquired its sweet scent when Mary wiped her forehead with its leaves. Another plant is Kaff Maryam (Anastatica), which was used in folk practice Muslim women to help in pregnancy, and the water of this plant was given to women to drink while praying.

Islamic literature does not recount many instances from Mary's later life, and her assumption is not present in any Muslim records. Nevertheless, some contemporary Muslim scholars, an example being Martin Lings, accepted the assumption as being a historical event from Mary's life. One of the lesser-known events which are recorded in Muslim literature is that of Mary visiting Rome with John and Thaddeus (Jude), the disciples (al-Hawāriyūn) of Jesus, during the reign of Nero.

Qadi al-Nu'man, the tenth century Ismaili Muslim jurist and luminary, in his book on the esoteric interpretation of faith, Asās al-Ta'wīl, talks about the spiritual birth (milad al-bātin) of Jesus, as an interpretation of his story of physical birth (milad al-zāhir). He says that Mary, the mother of Jesus, was a metaphor for someone who nurtured and instructed Jesus, rather than physically giving birth to him. He also pointed out that Zachariah (The Imam of the Time) appointed Mary as one of his proofs (sing. hujja).

According to Imam Ja'far al-Sadiq, Jesus the son of Mary used to cry intensely as a child, so that Mary was at wits end regarding his profuse crying. He said to her, "Get some of the bark of that tree, make a tonic from it and feed me with it." When he drank it, he cried intensely. Mary said, "What sort of prescription did you give me?" He said, "Oh my mother! Knowledge of prophet-hood and weakness of childhood."

The Fatimid Ismaili jurist Al-Qadi al-Nu'man holds that the virgin birth of Jesus is meant to be interpreted symbolically. In his interpretation, Mary was the follower (lāḥiq), of the Imam Joachim (‘Imran). However, when Joachim realized that she was not suited for the Imamah, he passed it to Zechariah, who then passed it to John the Baptist. Meanwhile, Mary received spiritual inspiration (mādda) from God, revealing that he would invite a man [to the faith] who would become an exalted Speaker (nāṭiq) of a revealed religion (sharīʿa). According to al-Nu’man, the verses “She said: Lord! How can I have a child when no man has touched me?” (Quran 3:47) and “neither have I been unchaste” (Quran 19:20) are symbolic of Mary's saying, “How can I conduct the invitation (daʿwa) when the Imam of the Time has not given me permission to do so?” and “Nor shall I be unfaithful by acting against his command”, respectively. To this, a celestial hierarch replies “Such is God. He creates [i.e., causes to pass] what he wills” (Quran 3:47).

== See also ==
- Maryam (surah)
- Biblical narratives and the Qur'an
- Jesus in Islam
- Saint Mary – Iranian film depicting the life of Mary
