= John the Baptist in Islam =

Prophet Yaḥyā Alayhi as-Salam
- يحيى; John the Baptist
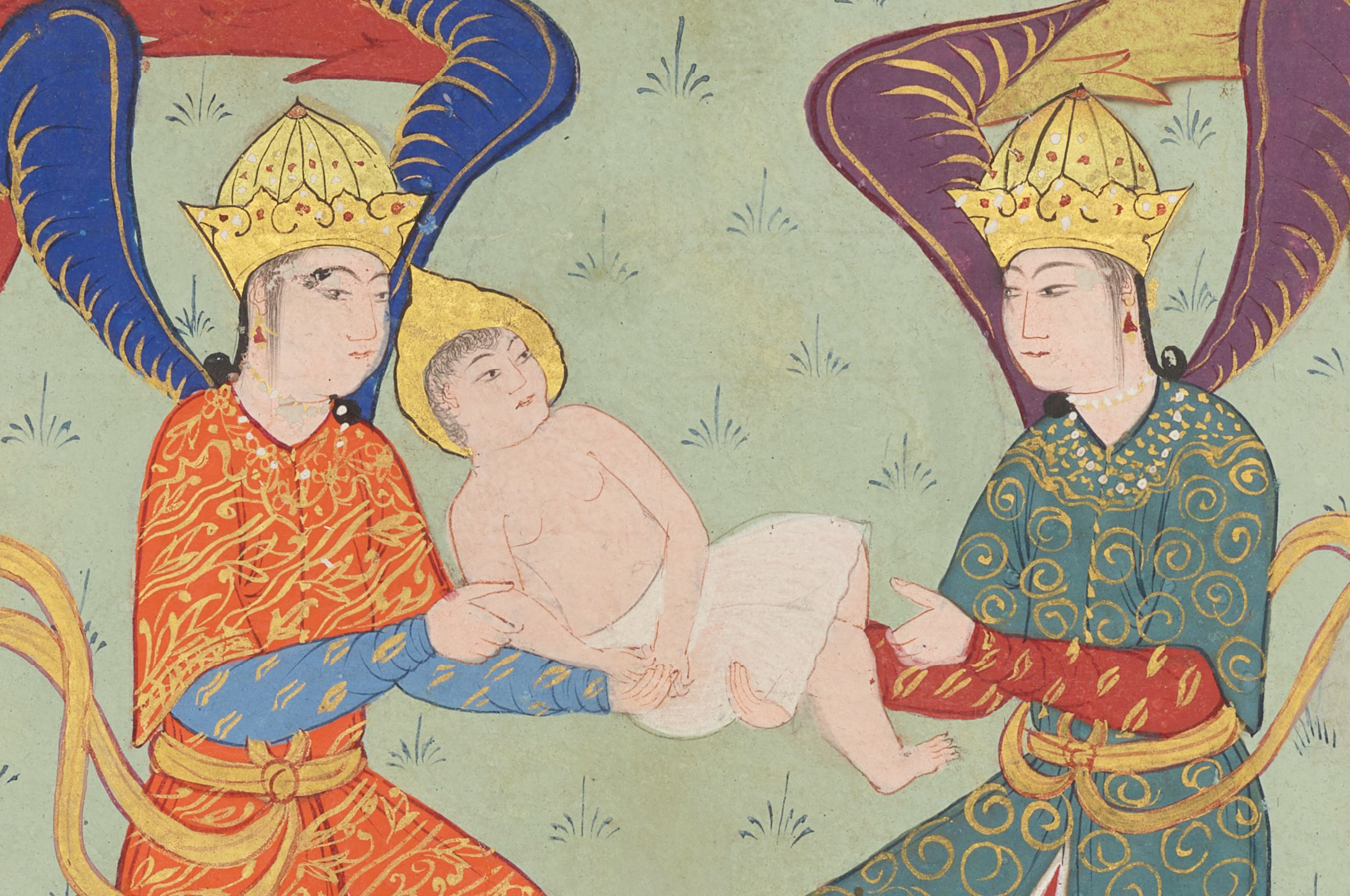
- Baby Yahya being held by two angels, late 16th century illustration from Ottoman manuscript

Prophet of Islam
- Preceded by: Zakariya
- Succeeded by: Isa

Personal life
- Born: Yahya ibn Zakariyya c. 5 B.C.E. Herodian Kingdom, Roman Empire
- Died: c. 30 C.E. (aged c. 34–35) Machaerus, Herodian Tetrarchy, Roman Empire
- Cause of death: Beheaded at Machaerus
- Parents: Zechariah (father); Isha' (Note: In Sunnī literature, Hananah in Shī'ī literature) (mother)
- Relatives: Isa (maternal cousin); Mariam (cousin or aunt)

Religious life
- Religion: Islam

Yaḥyā ibn Zakariyyā (Arabic: يحيى بن زكريا, lit. 'John, son of Zechariah'), identified Biblically as John the Baptist, is considered in Islam a prophet of God who was sent to guide the Children of Israel. He was the maternal cousin of Isa (Jesus) and believed by Muslims to have been a witness to the word of God, heralding the coming of Isa al-Masih (Jesus the Messiah).

Yahya is mentioned five times in the Qur'an. Yahya is also honoured highly in Sufism as well as Islamic mysticism, primarily because of the Qur'an's description of Yāhya’s chastity and kindness. Sufis have frequently applied commentaries on the passages on Yāhya in the Qur'an, primarily concerning the God-given gift of wisdom which he acquired in youth as well as his parallels with Isa. Although several phrases used to describe Yahya and Isa are virtually identical in the Qur'an, the manner in which they are expressed is different.

== Birth ==
The Qur'an frequently mentions Zakariya's continuous praying for the birth of a son. Zakariya's wife was barren and therefore the birth of a child seemed impossible. As a gift from God, Zakariya was given a son by the name of Yāhya, a name specially chosen for this child alone. In accordance with Zakariya's prayer, God made Yahya and Isa, who according to tafsir (exegesis) was born six months later, to renew the message of God, which had been corrupted and distorted by the Israelites.

Yahya and Isa were maternal cousins, although it is contested whether Isha', Yahya's mother, was Maryam's aunt or sister.

The Qur'an says that Yāhya was the first to receive this name (Quran 19:7-10) but since the name Yoḥanan occurs many times before Yāhya, this verse refers either to Islamic scholar consensus that "Yaḥyā" is not the same name as "Yoḥanan" or to the Biblical account of the miraculous naming of John, which accounted that he was almost named "Zacharias" (Greek: Ζαχαρίας) after his father, as no one in the lineage of his father Zacharias (Zechariah) had been named "John" ("Yohanan" or "Yoannes") before him. The Qur'an says:

˹The angels announced,˺ "O Zachariah! Indeed, We give you the good news of ˹the birth of˺ a son, whose name will be John—a name We have not given to anyone before."
He wondered, "My Lord! How can I have a son when my wife is barren, and I have become extremely old?"
An angel replied, "So will it be! Your Lord says, 'It is easy for Me, just as I created you before, when you were nothing!'"
Zachariah said, "My Lord! Grant me a sign." He responded, "Your sign is that you will not ˹be able to˺ speak to people for three nights, despite being healthy."
So he came out to his people from the sanctuary, signalling to them to glorify ˹God˺ morning and evening.
˹It was later said,˺ "O John! Hold firmly to the Scriptures." And We granted him wisdom while ˹he was still˺ a child,
as well as purity and compassion from Us. And he was God-fearing,
and kind to his parents. He was neither arrogant nor disobedient.

— Surah Maryam 19:7-14

== Prophethood ==
Yahya was exhorted to hold fast to the scripture and was given wisdom by God while still a child. He was pure and devout, and walked well in the presence of God. He was dutiful towards his parents and he was not arrogant or rebellious. Yahya's reading and understanding of the scriptures, when only a child, surpassed even that of the greatest scholars of the time. Islamic tafsir narrates that Isa sent Yahya out with twelve disciples, who preached the message before Jesus called his own disciples. The Qur'an says:

˹It was later said,˺ "O John! Hold firmly to the Scriptures [Torah]." And We granted him wisdom while ˹he was still˺ a child,

— Surah Maryam 19:12

Yahya was a classical prophet, who was exalted high by God for his bold denouncing of all things sinful. Furthermore, the Qur'an speaks of Yahya’s gentle piety and love, as well as his humble attitude towards life.

According to Islamic tradition, Yahya used to go to the Al Haram Ash-Sharif (Temple Mount) to deliver his sermons.

== Assassination and Burial ==
During the prophethood of Yahya, a conflict occurred between him and Herod Antipas, who wanted to divorce his wife and marry his niece. Yahya informed that the marriage would be abominably incestuous, and did not approve. After hearing this, Herod Antipas had Yahya imprisoned, then decapitated. Yahya's head is believed to be inside the Umayyad Mosque in Damascus. The shrine of Yahya is one of the several other locations purported to be the burial of his head and body.

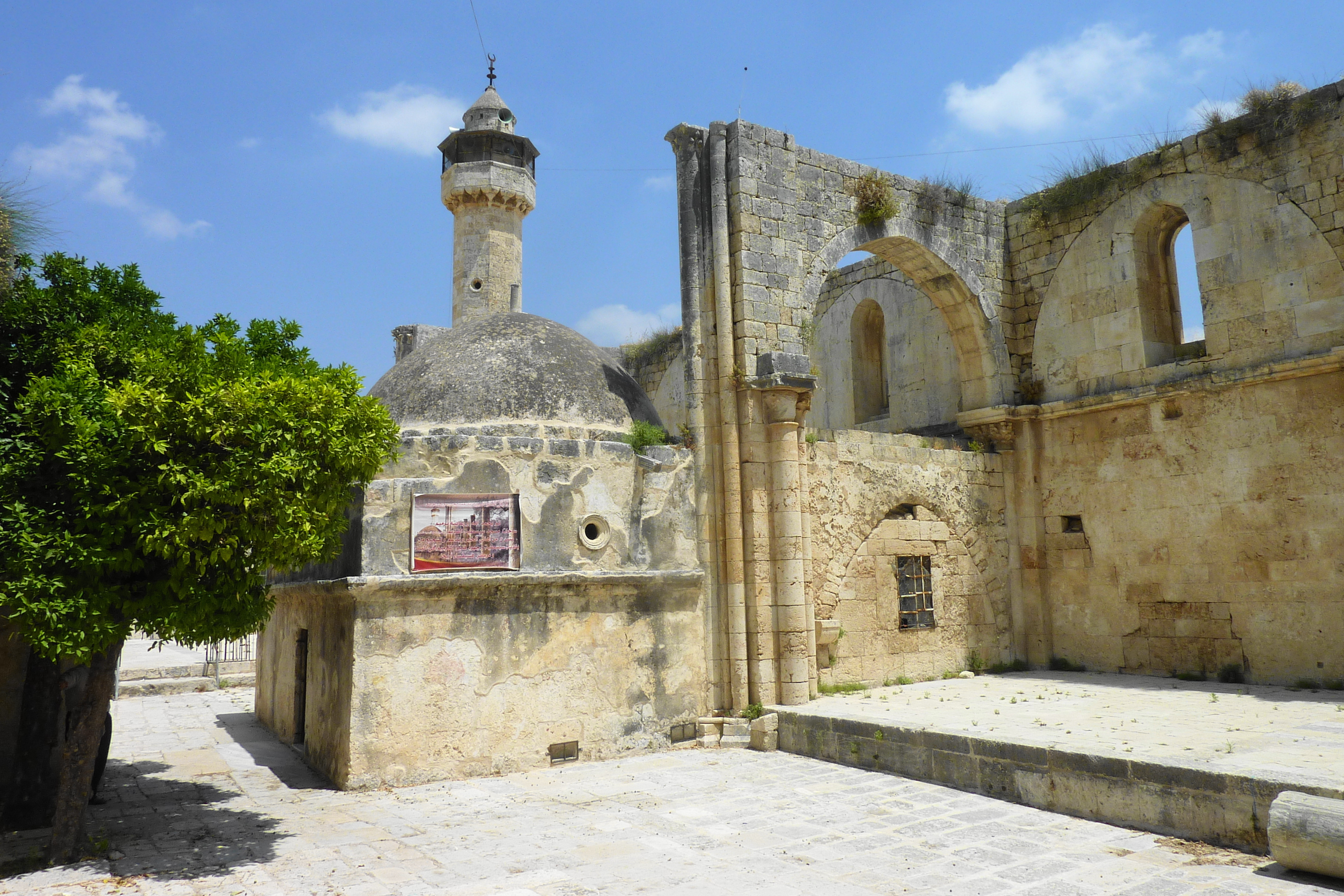
Shrine of Yahya in Sebastia, Palestine

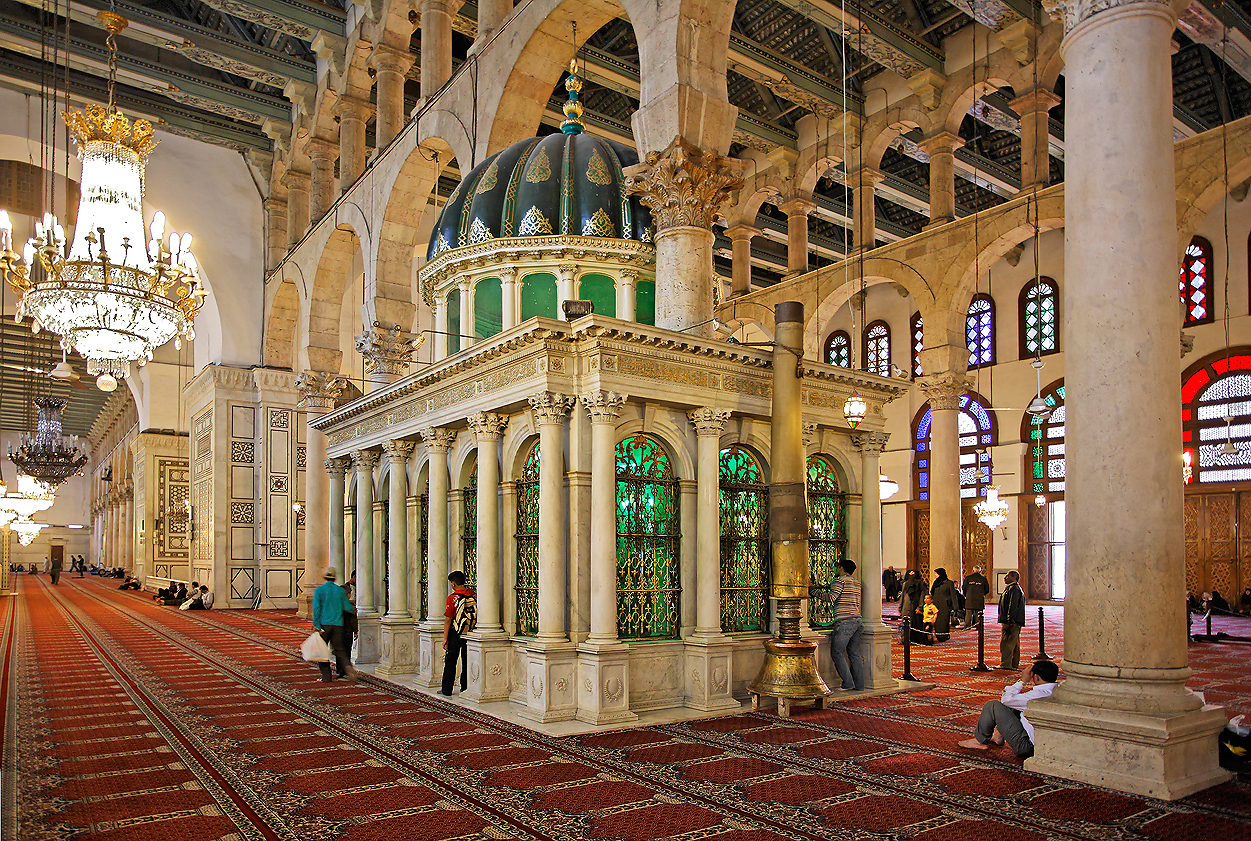
Shrine purportedly housing the head of Yahya in the Umayyad Mosque in Damascus, Syria

== Legacy ==
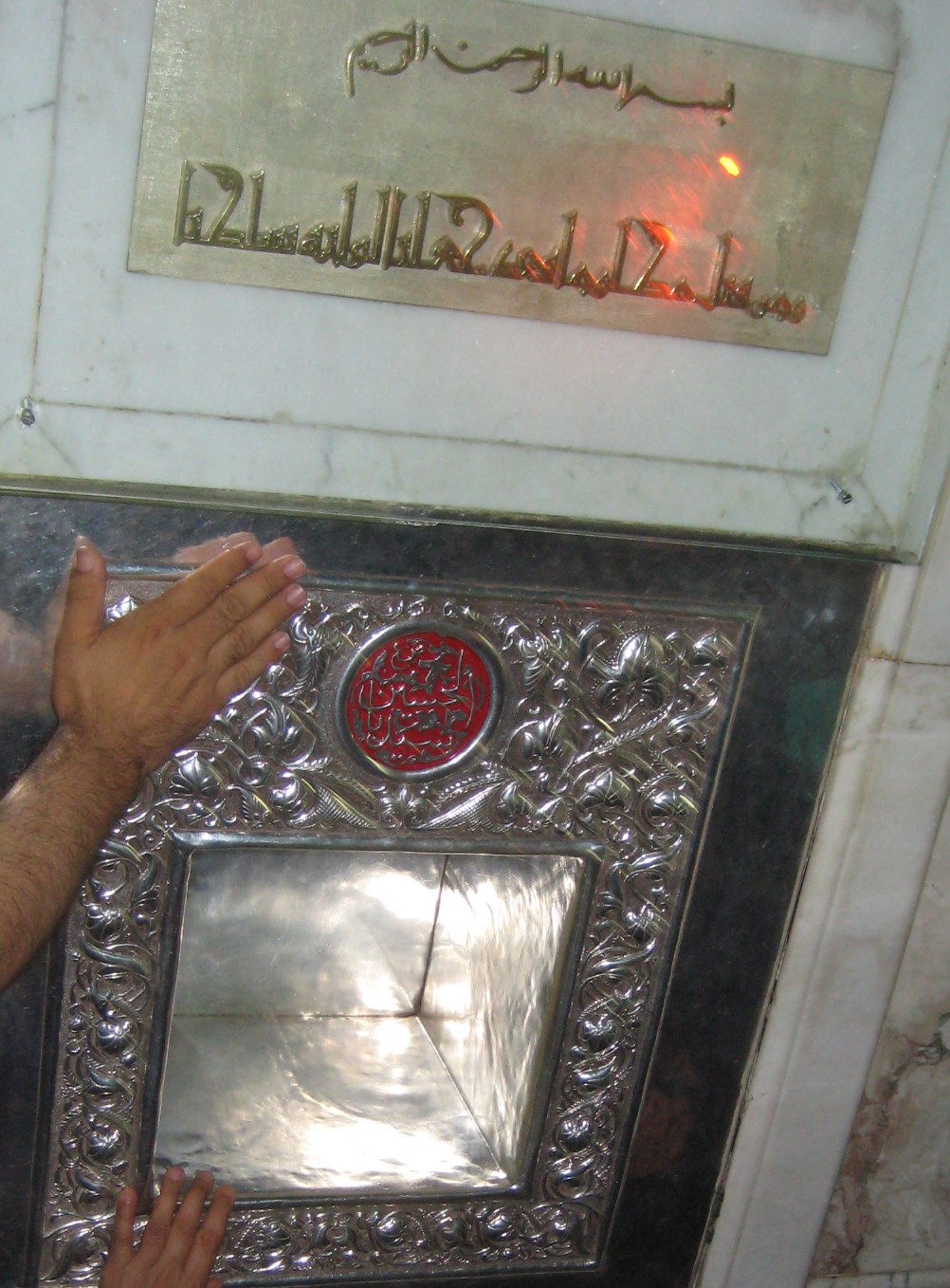
Like Yahya, Muhammad's grandson Al-Husain was beheaded, and his head was temporarily kept here, in what is now the Umayyad Mosque in Damascus

In Islam, Yahya greeted Muhammad on the night of the Al-Isra wal-Mi'raj, along with Isa, in the second heaven. Yahya's story was also told to the Abyssinian king during the Muslim migration to Abyssinia. According to the Qur'an, Yahya was one on whom God sent peace on the day that he was born and the day that he died. Shias compare Yahya with Muhammad's grandson Al-Husayn.
