= Charles Pierre Henri Rieu =

Swiss orientalist (1820–1902)

Charles Pierre Henri Rieu (June 8, 1820 – March 19, 1902) was a Swiss orientalist and Professor of Arabic in London and Cambridge.

== Biography ==
Rieu was born in Geneva, the son of soldier and politician Jean-Louis Rieu. He studied at Bonn University, where he studied Arabic under Georg Freytag and Johann Gildemeister, and Sanskrit with Christian Lassen. He received his doctorate in 1843. He entered the British Museum in 1847, and after twenty years of service, a new post, that of Keeper of Oriental Manuscripts, was created for him.

He was a Professor of Arabic and Persian at University College London. In 1895 he was made professor of Arabic in the University of Cambridge, with the full title "Sir Thomas Adams Professor of Arabic", in succession to Robertson Smith.

Rieu died in London on 19 March 1902. He was the father of E. V. Rieu and of Sir Louis Rieu.

== Publications ==
Rieu completed in 1871 the second part, dealing with Arabic manuscripts, of the Catalogus codicum manuscriptorum orientalium, which had been begun by William Cureton, and he issued a supplementary volume in 1894.

He also drew up a Catalogue of the Turkish Manuscripts (1888) and a Catalogue of the Persian Manuscripts (4 vols, 1879–95), the latter being a storehouse of information on the books and their authors.
