= Zechariah in Islam =

Prophet of Islam

Prophet Zakariyyā Alayhi as-Salam
- زَكَرِيَّا; Zechariah
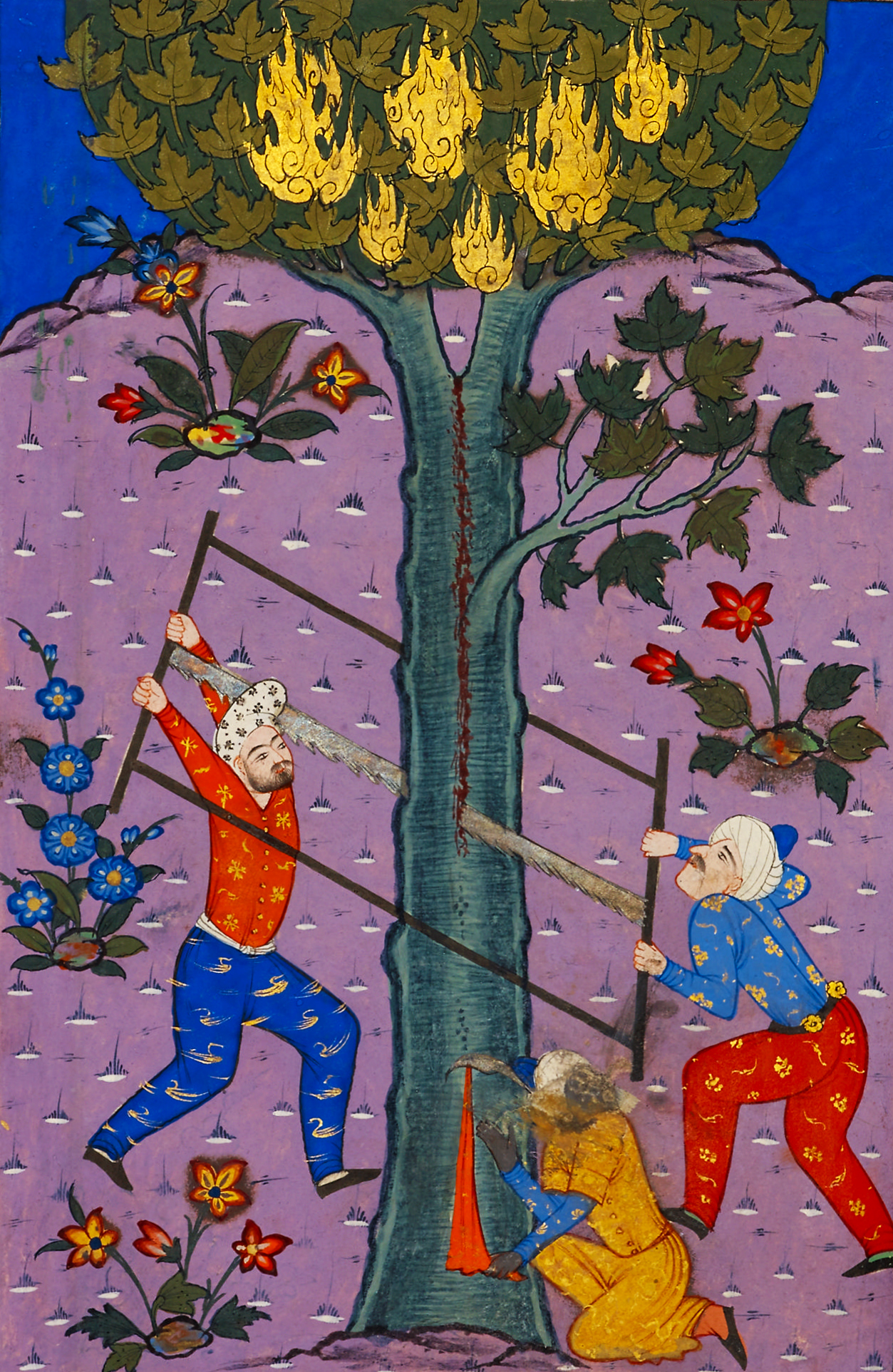
- Zakaria being sawed in half along with the hollow tree in which he was hiding after Iblis revealed the lappet of his garments peaking out.

Prophet of Islam
- Preceded by: Dhu al-Kifl
- Succeeded by: Yahya

Personal life
- Born: Zakariyya c. 97 BCE Jerusalem, Hasmonean Kingdom, Palestine
- Died: c. 33 CE (age c. 130) Jerusalem, Herodian Tetrarchy, Roman Empire
- Cause of death: Sawn in half by the Romans
- Spouse: Isha (Note: Known by Shia Muslims as Hananah)
- Children: Yahya ibn Zakariya
- Known for: Being the father of Yahya

Religious life
- Religion: Islam

According to the Islamic doctrine, Zakariyyā (Arabic: زَكَرِيَّا, Zechariah; 97 BCE – 33 CE) is a prophet of God, and the father of the prophet Yahya.

== In the Quran ==
According to the Quran, Zakariya was said to be a priest and prophet of God whose office was in the Second Temple in Jerusalem. He would frequently be in charge of managing the services of the temple and he would always remain steadfast in prayer to Allah.

=== Praying for a son ===
As he reached his old age, Zakariya began to worry over who would continue the legacy of preaching the message of God after his death and who would carry on the daily services of the temple after him. Zakariya started to pray to God for a son. The praying for the birth of an offspring was not merely out of the desire for a child. He prayed both for himself and for the public – they needed a messenger, a man of God who would work in the service of the Lord after Zakariya. Zakariya had character and virtue and he wanted to transfer this to his spiritual heir as his most precious possession. His dream was to restore the household to the posterity of the Patriarch Jacob, and to make sure the message of God was renewed for Israel. As the Qur'an recounts:

19:4 saying, “My Lord! Surely my bones have become brittle, and grey hair has spread across my head, but I have never been disappointed in my prayer to You, my Lord!
19:5 And I am concerned about ˹the faith of˺ my relatives after me, since my wife is barren. So grant me, by Your grace, an heir,
19:6 who will inherit ˹prophethood˺ from me and the family of Jacob, and make him, O Lord, pleasing ˹to You˺!”

— Surah Maryam 19:4-6

=== Fathering Yahya ===
As a gift from God, Zakariya was given a son named John (Yaḥyá Arabic: يحيى), a name specially chosen for this child alone. Muslim tradition narrates that Zakariya was ninety-two years old when he was told of John's birth.

In accordance with Zakariya's prayer, God made Yahya renew the message of God, which had been corrupted and lost by the Israelites. As the Qur'an says:

19:7 ˹The angels announced,˺ “O Zachariah! Indeed, We give you the good news of ˹the birth of˺ a son, whose name will be John—a name We have not given to anyone before.”
19:8 He wondered, “My Lord! How can I have a son when my wife is barren, and I have become extremely old?”
19:9 An angel replied, “So will it be! Your Lord says, ‘It is easy for Me, just as I created you before, when you were nothing!’”
19:10 Zachariah said, “My Lord! Grant me a sign.” He responded, “Your sign is that you will not ˹be able to˺ speak to people for three nights, despite being healthy.”

— Surah Maryam 19:7-10

=== Guardian of Maryam ===
According to the Qur'an, Zakariya was the guardian of Maryam. The Qur'an states:

3:35 Your service, so accept it from me. You ˹alone˺ are truly the All-Hearing, All-Knowing.”
3:36 When she delivered, she said, “My Lord! I have given birth to a girl,”—and Allah fully knew what she had delivered—“and the male is not like the female. I have named her Mariam, and I seek Your protection for her and her offspring from Satan, the accursed.”
3:37 So her Lord accepted her graciously and blessed her with a pleasant upbringing—entrusting her to the care of Zachariah. Whenever Zachariah visited her in the sanctuary, he found her supplied with provisions. He exclaimed, “O Mariam! Where did this come from?” She replied, “It is from Allah. Surely Allah provides for whoever He wills without limit.”

— Surah Al Imran 3:35-37

Muslim theology maintains that Zakariya, along with John and Jesus, ushered in a new era of prophets—all of whom came from the priestly lineage of Imran, (Joachim, or Amram; not to be confused with Amram father of Moses), who is the father of Mary (Maryam) and grandfather of Jesus. The fact that, of all the priests, it was Zakariya who was given the duty of keeping care of Mary (Maryam) shows his status as a pious man. Zakariya is frequently praised in the Qur'an as a prophet of God and righteous man. One such appraisal is in Surat Al-An'am:

"Likewise, ˹We guided˺ Zachariah, John, Jesus, and Elias, who were all of the righteous."

— Surah Al-An'am 6:85

== Assassination ==
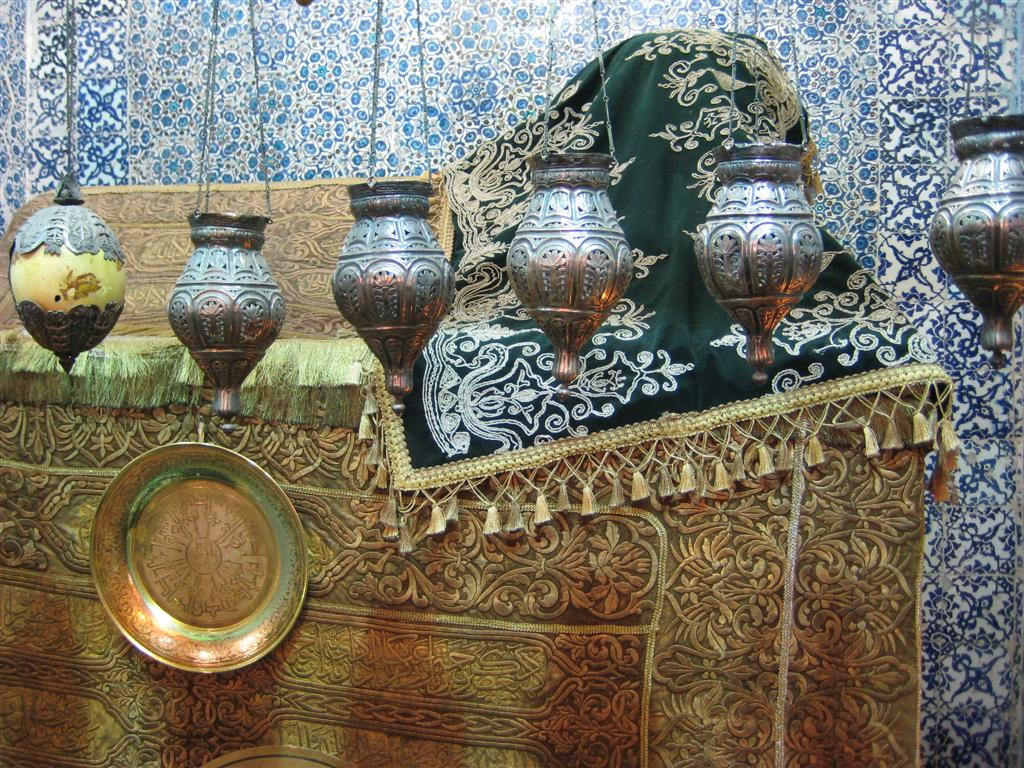
Tomb in the Great Mosque of Aleppo, Syria

After his son Prophet Yahya (John) had been decapitated by the Children of Israel, Zakariya tried to escape from them. Some historians say that as a miracle a tree opened for Zakariya to hide in but a small part of his clothing mistakenly stuck out. Shaytan (Satan) saw this and took it to his advantage. He took on the form of a human and told the Children of Israel where Zakariya was hiding. For this, the soldiers then cut down the tree, killing Zakariya painfully though he didn't cry. Some people say he was 130 years old when he died.
