= D. C. H. Rieu =

British classical scholar (1916–2008)

- Born: 26 October 1916; Bombay, British India
- Died: 29 April 2008 (aged 91)

Dominic Christopher Henry Rieu (26 October 1916 – 29 April 2008) was a classical scholar and the son of the classicist and publisher E. V. Rieu.

== Background ==
After attending Highgate School, he studied English and Classics at Queen's College, Oxford. As a member of the West Yorkshire Regiment in 1941, he was injured at Cheren in Eritrea, and subsequently awarded the Military Cross. Rieu served as headmaster of Simon Langton Grammar School for Boys in Canterbury from 1955 until 1977.

Rieu did a translation of the Acts of the Apostles in the Penguin Classics series and, with Dr Peter Jones, revised his father's translations of The Odyssey and the Iliad. While acknowledging his father's "towering skill", Rieu made amendments to some undue embroidery of phrase and Greek manners, disdain for anonymous gods, formulaic abuse and modernistic prose. "Some of his racier colloquialisms, however, I have kept, provided they come in dialogue; the narrative passages call for a degree of formality. Poseidon, in his fury with Odysseus, says (literal translation): 'I mean to give him his full trouble yet.' EVR's 'bellyful of trouble' is much livelier -- and typical of the irascible Poseidon."

When he and Dr Peter Jones took up the task of revising E. V. Rieu's translation of The Odyssey, they determined to retain (and in places even enhance) its charm. "Our alterations were in fact puny," wrote Rieu Junior in the preface. Although keen to maintain Homer's formulaic construction, he revised the archaic preliminaries used prior to speeches. "The patient good Odysseus answering him said: 'Friends [...]'" becomes "'Friends,' replied the patient good Odysseus [...]".

Rieu involved himself in retirement with the Samaritans and Cruse Bereavement Counselling. He wrote and edited many books and articles, including A Life Within A Life: an Introduction to Subud; Talks by Muhammad Subuh Sumohadiwidjojo, compiled and edited by Dominic C.H. Rieu (1983, 2nd edition 2008) and The Odyssey, by Homer; translated by E. V. Rieu; revised by his son D. C. H. Rieu in consultation with Peter V. Jones (1991).
