= N. J. Dawood =

Iraqi translator (1927–2014)

Nessim Joseph Dawood (27 August 1927 – 20 November 2014) was an Iraqi Jewish translator, who is best known for his translation of the Quran.

== Life ==
Nessim Joseph Dawood was born in Baghdad to a Jewish family. His family name was Yehuda, but in the Iraqi tradition his legal name consisted of his own given name, plus those of his father and paternal grandfather, “Nessim Yousef [Joseph] David.” He changed "David" to "Dawood" when he was granted British nationality in the 1940s. His pen name was N. J. Dawood.

Bilingual in Arabic and English, he started tutoring schoolmates in English. He came to England as an Iraq state scholar in 1945, and studied English Literature and Classical Arabic at the University of London in the first cohort of students to resume normal university studies after the Second World War.

After graduating in 1949, he worked as a journalist and was invited by Sir Allen Lane – the founder of Penguin Books – to translate a selection of Tales from the Thousand and One Nights into English, to mark the publication of Penguin No. 1001 in 1954. According to his introduction, Dawood decided to "ignore the division of the tales into nights" and removed the poems because he thought they were "devoid of literary merit". Dawood also added a number of other tales that were not in previous editions of the Thousand and One Nights. Several of these Tales were broadcast during the 1950s on the BBC, in radio productions by Terence Tiller. Geert Jan van Gelder, Professor Emeritus at the University of Oxford and an expert on Classical Arabic literature, has called Dawood's translation "unsatisfactory, to put it mildly". It has also been published as an audiobook and has remained in print as a Penguin for some seven decades.

Lane and E. V. Rieu, the editor of Penguin Classics, proposed a new translation of the Koran, which at that time was largely unknown to British readers. The only previous translations were in an archaic, literal style; the aim was to produce a modern translation that would be accessible to the English-speaking reader. The first edition was published in 1956 as Penguin No. L52. In this edition, Dawood rearranged the chapters (surahs) into more-or-less chronological order, to make them easier to understand, in line with the chronological approach found in the Old and New Testaments. Later revisions of his translation reverted to the traditional sequence of the surahs (beginning with the short surah Al Fātiḥah, but further roughly arranged in descending order of length).

His translation of the Koran is one of the best-selling English language versions – it has been reprinted at least 70 times, appearing in several revised editions and formats (and also in pirated editions published in Iran and Lebanon). For him, the Koran was a lifelong “work in progress” – constantly revised and refined in the course of an entire career. Language and use of English change constantly over time: for example, terms such as “Men” and “Mankind” did not have the same gender-specific connotations for the reader of the 1950s that might apply today. Dawood's translation has never been out of print; his final revised edition was published in May 2014.

He died on 20 November 2014.

== Approach to translation ==
Dawood greatly admired the Koran's eloquence and powerful rhetoric, describing it in his introduction as "not only one of the most influential books of prophetic literature but also a literary masterpiece in its own right" and his translation endeavoured to do justice to both. The translation includes explanatory footnotes.

Dawood has also edited and abridged the Muqaddimah of the great philosopher-historian Ibn Khaldun, published by Princeton University Press, and described by Mark Zuckerberg as "one of the 23 books everyone should read". He has retold some of the best-known stories of the Arabian Nights in three children's books, in the Puffin Books series.

In the late 1950s, Dawood founded the Arabic Advertising & Publishing Co Ltd, a language consultancy specializing in Arabic. The 1960s and 1970s were a crucial time for development of the Middle East as a market for British, European and North American products and services. Some of the best-known brands still use hand-drawn Arabic logos that he developed at that time. The company until recently traded as Aradco VSI Ltd, providing translation and language services in every commercially important language. Dawood's academic discipline and key tenets govern the company's approach to all its work: a good translation should always appear to the reader to be the "original version", never a translation of something else.

== See also ==
- Iraqi Jews
