= E. V. Rieu =

British poet (1887–1972)

Emile Victor Rieu CBE
- Rieu in 1957
- Born: 10 February 1887; London, United Kingdom
- Died: 11 May 1972 (aged 85)
- Education: Balliol College, Oxford
- Children: 4, including D. C. H. Rieu
- Father: Charles Pierre Henri Rieu

Emile Victor Rieu CBE (10 February 1887 – 11 May 1972) was a British classicist, publisher, poet and translator. He initiated the Penguin Classics series of books in 1946 and edited it for twenty years.

== Biography ==
Rieu was born on 10 February 1887 in London, England. He was the youngest child of the Swiss Orientalist Charles Pierre Henri Rieu (1820–1902), and his wife Agnes, daughter of Julius Heinrich Hisgen of Hamburg. He was a scholar of St Paul's School and Balliol College, Oxford, gaining a first in Classical Honours Moderations in 1908. In 1914 he married Nelly Lewis, daughter of a Pembrokeshire businessman. They had two sons (one was D. C. H. Rieu) and two daughters. Rieu died in London in 1972.

== Publishing and translating ==
Having worked for the Bombay branch of Oxford University Press, Rieu joined the publishers Methuen in London in 1923, where he was managing director from 1933 to 1936, and then academic and literary adviser.

Rieu became best known for his lucid translations of Homer and for a modern translation of the four Gospels which evolved from his role as editor of a projected (but aborted) Penguin translation of the Bible. Though he had been a lifelong agnostic, his experience translating the Gospels brought him to change and join the Church of England. His translation of the Odyssey, 1946, was the opener of the Penguin Classics, a series that he founded with Sir Allen Lane and edited from 1944 to 1964. According to his son, "[h]is vision was to make available to the ordinary reader, in good modern English, the great classics of every language."

The inspiration for the Penguin Classics series, initially faint, came early in the Second World War, while bombs were falling. Each night after supper, Rieu would sit with his wife and daughters in London and translate to them passages from the Odyssey. The Penguin editors are said to have been dubious about the commercial prospects for the book (1946), but it became recognised as a classic itself, celebrated for the smooth and original prose, and the forerunner of Penguin's successful series of translated classics.

Often, though, he embroidered Homer's verse, following the principle that has since become known as dynamic equivalence or thought-for-thought translation. Whereas a literal translation would read, for example, "As soon as early-born Dawn appeared, rosy-fingered," Rieu's version offered, "No sooner had the tender Dawn shown her roses in the East." Some of his renderings were boldly contemporary: "the meeting adjourned," "I could fancy him," and, "It's the kind of thing that gives a girl a good name in town." He sometimes discarded Homer's anonymous immortals: "A god put this into my mind" became "It occurred to me." Rieu also tended to make the characters more courteous by preceding orders with "Kindly..." or "Be good enough to..." Some of these foibles were amended in a revision made by his son D. C. H. Rieu, who also translated The Acts of the Apostles by Saint Luke (1957) for the Penguin series.

By the time Rieu retired as general editor of the Penguin Classics series, he had overseen the publication of about 160 volumes. He assiduously tracked down all the scholars and translators he wanted for each, creating a series that combined sound scholarship with readability, and accessibility through authoritative introductions and notes. Rieu himself also translated the Iliad (1950), the Voyage of Argo (1959) by Apollonius of Rhodes, The Four Gospels (1952) and Virgil's Pastoral Poems (1949). Having become an Anglican in 1947, Rieu sat on the joint churches' committee that oversaw the production of the New English Bible (1961–70). The genial and witty Rieu was a friend and editorial mentor of the science fiction writer Olaf Stapledon.

== Poetry and stories for children ==
Rieu is less known for his children's verse, Cuckoo Calling: a book of verse for youthful people (1933). This he expanded as The Flattered Flying Fish and Other Poems (1962). A selection of his verse appeared in A Puffin Quartet of Poets (1958). For Rieu himself, his poems were a sideline, aimed mainly at children.

Rieu wrote the short story "Pudding Law: A Nightmare", included in The Great Book for Girls, published by Oxford University Press.

== Honours ==
The University of Leeds awarded him an honorary Doctor of Letters degree (DLitt) in 1949. He was appointed Commander of the Order of the British Empire (CBE) in 1953 Coronation Honours. In 1951, he was chosen president of the Virgil Society and seven years later vice-president of the Royal Society of Literature.

== Tribute ==
Irish poet Patrick Kavanagh evoked the translations' crisp and readable character in a poem "On Looking into E. V. Rieu's Homer":

"In stubble fields the ghosts of corn are
The important spirits the imagination heeds.
Nothing dies; there are no empty
Spaces in the cleanest-reaped fields."

English poet Stevie Smith was moved by Rieu's translation of the Gospel of Mark to write her poem "The Airy Christ", for which she credited him in her brief introduction.

== See also ==
- English translations of Homer
