= Women in the Quran =

Women in the Quran are important characters and subjects of discussion included in the stories and morals taught in Islam. Most of the women in the Quran are represented as either mothers or wives of leaders or prophets. They retained a certain amount of autonomy from men in some respects; for example, the Quran describes women who converted to Islam before their husbands or women who took an independent oath of allegiance to Muhammad.

While the Quran does not name any woman except for Virgin Mary directly, women play a role in many of its stories. These stories have been subject to manipulation and rigid interpretation in both classical commentary and popular literature from patriarchal societies. The cultural norms existing within a patriarchy have shaped the way that these societies approached the text and created a pervading narrative that dictated the way future generations were set up to interpret these stories and the role of women within the Quran. Throughout history, different Islamic scriptural interpreters and lawmakers constantly reinterpreted the women presented in the Quran as a result of the dominating ideology and historical context of the time. In the wake of modernity and the rise of Islamic feminism, many scholars are looking back to the original text, reexamining the accepted classical interpretations of women, and reimagining women's role within the Quran.

== Hawwa ==
Eve (Hawwa), Adam's spouse, is mentioned in Q2:30-39; 7:11-25; 15:26–42; 17:61–65; 18:50–51; 20:110–124; and in verses 38:71–85, but the name "Eve" (Arabic: حواء, Ḥawwā') is never revealed or used in the Quran. Eve is mentioned by name only in hadith. The Quranic narrative of Adam and Eve's creation and fall differs thematically from the more fleshed-out story in the Jewish and Christian traditions. Similar to the Christian and Jewish tale, Allah created Adam and Eve and a place for them to live, Paradise. However, in the Quran, Hawwa's role is minimal, as she is the accomplice to human sin rather than the instigator. It is Adam who is forewarned by Allah that Iblis, Satan, is their natural enemy and the threat to their removal from heaven.

"So We said: O Adam! This is an enemy to you and to your wife; therefore let him not drive you both forth from the garden so that you should be unhappy; "

— Quran 20:117 (Note: Quran, 20:117)

The literal Quranic text in many ways removes the blame that is often placed upon Eve. Instead of being portrayed as the cause of Adam's fall, Eve is merely presented as equally compliant in the sin and then later, equally compliant in the punishment and atonement. However early critical interpretation surrounding the creation and fall story was influenced heavily by the pervading Christian and Jewish notions of Eve. Therefore, early medieval interpretations focus on depicting Hawwa as morally and mentally compromised. As in the Christian and Jewish tradition, Hawwa is seen as the one who tempts the prophet Adam into sin. The early work of Hadith-based scholar al-Tabari in particular showcases many passages that claim women's menstruation and the affliction of bearing children are a direct result of Hawwa's foolishness.

"Were it not for the calamity that afflicted Hawwa, the women of this world would not menstruate, would be wise, and would bear their children with ease."

— al-Tabari (I:529)

However, in modern times the explanation and general understanding of Hawwa have shifted and are deeply debated. Her status as the first woman in the world is relevant since she is looked upon as the model for her sex and Allah's archetype of a woman. Today both traditional and modernist thinkers look to Hawwa either to support or deny their argument regarding the equality of women in the religion. Specifically, those with a traditionalist view believe in the hadith and the interpretation that Hawwa was created from one of Adam's crooked ribs. And therefore when the Prophet explained women were created from the crooked part of the rib, "He was not blaming the woman, but was defining women's natural disposition and the preponderance of emotions over rationality." In response, more liberal interpretations cite no direct and incontestable truth that Hawwa was created from a "crooked rib"; they claim such suggestions do not stem from verifiable sources. Rather, they strive to emphasize the purpose of the creation and fall story itself. This was not to decry the human nature of either sex but act as an example of Allah's guidance, punishment and ultimate forgiveness.

== Wives of Noah and Lot ==
Oftentimes the names of these women are confused, however, the general scholarly consensus is that Noah's wife was Amzura while Lot's wife was Wā'ila. This continual reversal of the two names underscores exactly how both women have ultimately served the same purpose in Islamic scriptural interpretation. In the case of Noah's wife many theorists surmise that she died in the flood and was not allowed on the ark because of her continual insinuation that her husband was crazy. In turn, Lot's wife is thought to have died alongside the people of Sodom since she betrayed her duty as a wife and conspired alongside the corrupt people. In both examples the wives of Allah's prophets were the only ones punished for their disbelief and betrayal of their husbands. This is an important distinction, since Islamic theorists highlight that this establishes the spiritual individuality of women. It is they who have the freedom to choose their religiosity, and it is they who in turn pay the price. Ultimately, the purpose of their mention in the Quran is to set an example of the consequence for active disbelief in Allah and his prophets.

The three verses in the Quran mentioning the wives of Noah and Lot, or Nuh and Lut in Arabic, are a conjoined entry depicting the consequences and response by Allah to non-believers.

"God sets forth an example to those who disbelieve: the wife of Noah and the wife of Lot, they were both under two of Our righteous servants, but they acted treacherously towards them so they availed them naught against God, and it was said: Enter both the fire with those who enter."

— Quran, Sura 66 (At-Tahrim), ayat 10 (Note: Quran, 66:10)

== Daughters of Lot ==
The role that Lot's daughters play in these interpretations is largely passive and an attempt to demonstrate his devotion to God. However, beyond that simple explanation, they also act as a foil to their mother who conspired with the people of Sodom by alerting them to Lot's guests. While their mother was therefore condemned to the same fate as the sinners in Sodom, Lot's daughters were spared and escaped owing to their personal atonement.

And his people came rushing towards him and they had been long in the habit of practising abominations. He said: "O my people! Here are my daughters: they are purer for you (if ye marry). Now fear God and cover me not with shame about my guests! Is there not among you a single right-minded man?" They said: "Well dost thou know we have no need of thy daughters: indeed thou knowest quite well what we want!"

— Quran, Sura 11 (Hud), ayat 79 (Note: Quran, 11:79)

However, the people of Sodom reject Lot's offering and continue their sinful deeds. At next mention in Sura 15 (al-Hijr) Lot again offers his daughters. This time though, his actions were taken to prevent the people of Sodom from committing abominations against the guests in his house.

He said, "Here are my daughters, if you must be doing what you intend to do!"

— Quran, Sura 15 (al-Hijr), ayat 71 (Note: Quran, 15:71)

== Sarah, Wife of Abraham ==
In contrast to the Old Testament and the Torah, Sarah, wife of the prophet Abraham, plays a decidedly smaller role in the Quran. In both the Christian and Jewish traditions she is the mother of the chosen son, Isaac, and therefore a more important person.

In the hadith Sarah is not mentioned directly but rather alluded to in Hagar's expanded story. Hagar's struggles, dealt with extensively in Sahih al-Bukhari, are important to the Islamic tradition since many Muslims paint her as the mother of all Arabs and one of the pre-Islamic pioneers. While this may seem to castigate Sarah as the villain in Hagar's story, she is not seen or depicted in Islamic writing as the impetus for Hagar's exile. Unlike the more traditional Jewish and Christian explanations that paint a contentious relationship between Hagar and Sarah, Islamic interpretations are largely devoid of commentary on Sarah, choosing rather to focus on the hardships and successes of Hagar.

And his wife, standing [nearby], laughed [with happiness]; whereupon We gave her the glad tiding of [the birth of] Isaac and, after Isaac, of [his son] Jacob. Quran, Sura 11 (Hud), ayat 71–72 (Note: Quran, 11:71_72)

At second time, Sarah is mentioned is Surah Al-Dhazariyat Verse#29.

== Aziz's Wife (Zulaykha) and the Ladies ==
The story of Yusuf and Zulaykha, wife of Joseph's master the Aziz, is one of the most extensive depictions of women in the Quran. She appears in Surah 12 (Yusuf) as part of Joseph's chronological narrative shortly after he is sold into slavery in Egypt. In this narrative Zulaykha attempts to seduce Joseph, at first outright and then by using guile and wit.

But she in whose house he was, sought to seduce him from his (true) self: she fastened the doors, and said: "Now come, thou (dear one)!" He said: "God forbid! Truly (thy husband) is my lord! He made my sojourn agreeable! Truly to no good come those who do wrong!"

— Quran, Sura 12 (Yusuf), ayat 23 (Note: Quran, 12:23)

As Joseph rebuffed her advances, he hastily attempted to leave. However, Zulaykha chased after him, and the two found Al-Aziz at the door. She then accused Joseph of trying to rape her, but was quickly proven wrong when he saw that Joseph's garment was torn from the back (meaning she pursued him and pulled him towards her until she tore his shirt). Following this incident, the women of society began to gossip about Zulaykha's affection for Joseph. She, in turn, prepared a banquet in these women's honor. At this banquet when Joseph appeared, the women were so enamored by his beauty that they had accidentally cut their hands from the knives they were using. The story continues with Zulaykha promising that if Joseph did not accept her advances, she would have him imprisoned. Upon hearing this, Joseph prayed to God that he would rather go to prison than stay in Al-Aziz's house. Sure enough, Joseph was sent to jail. Many year later, when the King inquires the women and Zulaykha of their role, they respond:

"The king said (to the ladies): "What was your affair when ye did seek to seduce Joseph from his (true) self?" The ladies said: "God preserve us! No evil know we against him!" Said the 'Aziz's wife: "Now is the truth manifest (to all): it was I who sought to seduce him from his (true) self: He is indeed of those who are (ever) true (and virtuous)."

— Quran, Sura 12 (Yusuf), ayat 51 (Note: Quran, 12:51)

Renditions of this story outside the Quran have focused historically on and sought to establish the natural duplicitous and cunning nature of women. Especially in the works of early interpreters, Zulaykha and the ladies are not portrayed as the multi-faceted characters the Quran suggests but rather are considered only for "their unbridled sexuality and guile." This depiction is used as yet another conservative example of the inherent threat the female sex poses to men and their piety. Al-Baydawi's interpretation specifically highlights the inherent contrast between a prophet's devotion to God and the sly nature of women. Recently, however, the critical explanation surrounding Zulaykha has expanded to present different possible interpretations. In many instances this story is now used as an allegory depicting the ability of pious people, in this case, a prophet, to overcome the temptations of the world and adversity. In these cases, interpreters argue Zulaykha's presence in the Quran is not meant to imply the evil nature of all women, but rather the different possible distractions that society in general can present and the need to rebuff them.

== Mother and sister of Moses ==
Moses's mother is the only woman in the Quran to receive divine inspiration. God inspired her to suckle the child until she feared for his life and then to cast him into the river without sadness or fear because God would eventually restore him to her and make him one of the messengers.

"God sent an inspiration to Moses's mother that she should put Moses in a chest and throw the chest into the river, which would ultimately wash up on the shore of God's enemy and he would be taken in."

— Quran 28:7 (Note: Quran, 28:7)

When the Pharaoh's wife discovered Moses on the shore, God had to strengthen Moses's mother's heart to make her a firm believer.

"And the heart of Musa's mother was empty she would have almost disclosed it had We not strengthened her heart so that she might be of the believers."

— Quran 28:10 (Note: Quran, 28:10)

Then, after Moses's sister sees that he refuses to nurse with his new nurse, she suggests that Moses's mother become his nursemaid. In a sense, they were reunited.

"And We had before forbidden foster-mothers for him, so she said: Shall I show you a household who will rear him for you and take care of him? So We restored him to his mother that she might be comforted and not grieve, and that she might know that the promise of Allah is true. But most of them know not."

— Quran 28:12–13 (Note: Quran, 28:12–13)

== Wife of Moses ==
Moses's wife called Safura was the daughter of a Midianite flockherder whom Moses met before he became a prophet. The Madyanite flockherder allowed Moses and his daughter to wed in exchange for Moses performing eight to ten years of work.

"Said one of the (damsels): "O my (dear) father! engage him on wages: truly the best of men for thee to employ is the (man) who is strong and trusty. He said: "I intend to wed one of these my daughters to thee, on condition that thou serve me for eight years; but if thou complete ten years, it will be (grace) from thee. But I intend not to place thee under a difficulty: thou wilt find me, indeed, if God wills, one of the righteous."

— Quran, Sura 28 (Al-Qasas), ayat 26–27 (Note: Quran, 28:26–27)

She is not mentioned by name in the Quran, but some qisas al-anbiya' identify her as Zipporah. Many of the details surrounding Moses's wife have been filled in throughout history. Contemporary Muslims see her as a righteous Muslim female because of her respect for the different gender spheres. When she first met Moses, she was getting water in public, but was afraid because it is typically a male domain.

"And when he arrived at the watering (place) in Madyan, he found there a group of men watering (their flocks), and besides them, he found two women who were keeping back (their flocks). He said: "What is the matter with you?" They said: "We cannot water (our flocks) until the shepherds take back (their flocks): And our father is a very old man."

— Quran, Sura 28 (Al-Qasas), ayat 23 (Note: Quran, 28:23)

== Asiyah, Wife of the Pharaoh ==
The wife of the Pharaoh, known in some traditions as Asiyah, played a large role in Moses's life because she became his foster mother. She saved his life when she took him in and raised Moses from infancy in a household of non-believers while God watched over him.

Of all the women in Moses's life, Pharaoh's wife is the subject of the greatest amount of interpretive literature. There is a large amount of emphasis on her as an example for the believers. Many think of her as a righteous woman because of her role in keeping Moses alive, as shown in Q 28:9.

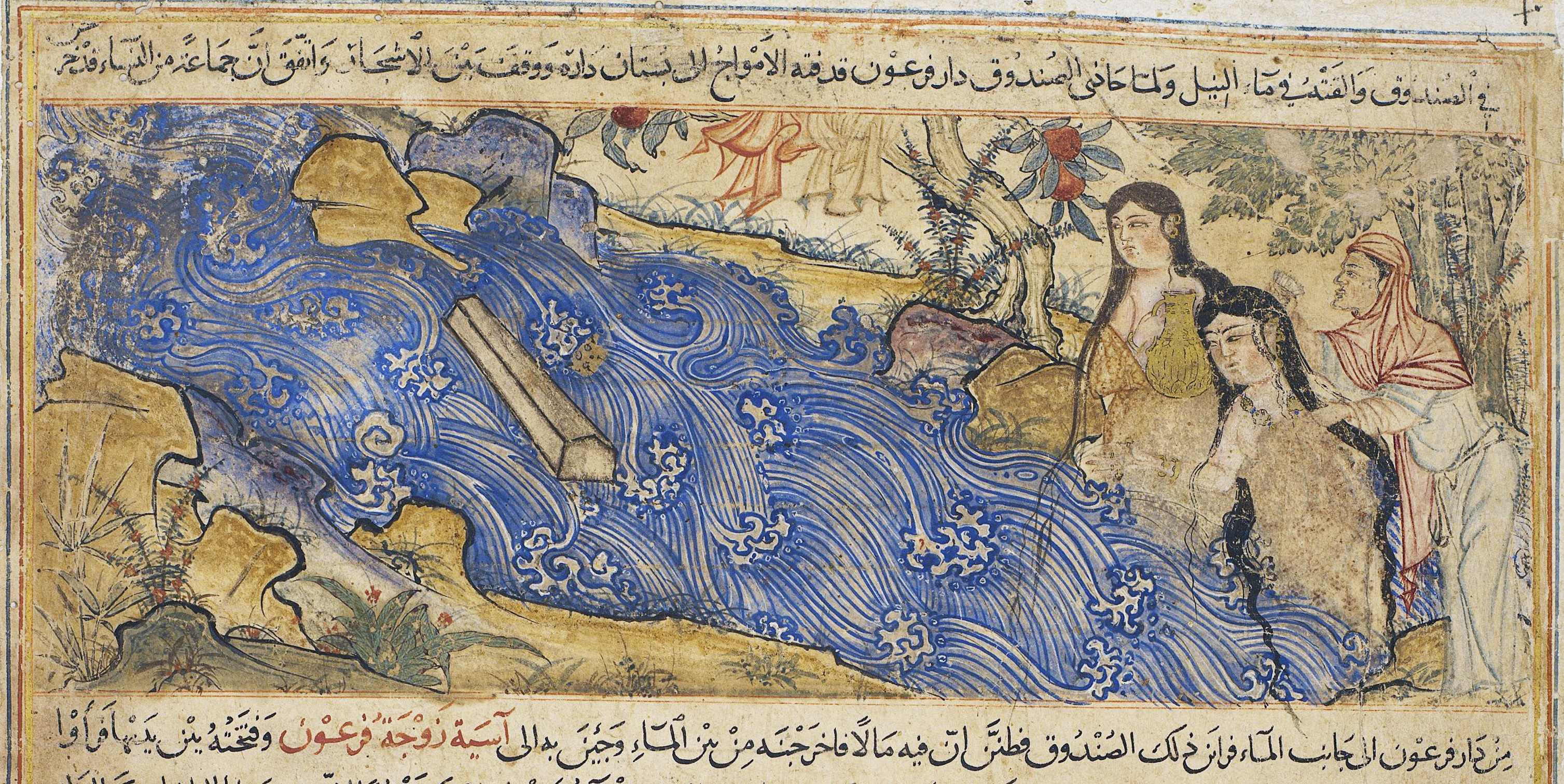
Asiya and her servants finding baby Moses in the Nile, Jami' al-tawarikh; possibly pious fiction that follows the footsteps of Sargon of Akkad's (Note: My mother, the high priestess, conceived; in secret she bore me, She set me in a basket of rushes, with bitumen she sealed my lid, She cast me into the river which rose over me.) accounts. It is a part of the founding myths of the Israelites, which were widely covered in the Quran.

"And the wife of Pharaoh said, "[He will be] a comfort of the eye for me and for you. Do not kill him; perhaps he may benefit us, or we may adopt him as a son." And they perceived not."

— Quran, Sura 28 (Al-Qasas), ayat 9 (Note: Quran, 28:9)

Additionally, Asiyah is praised because in Q 66: 11, which is dated into the late Medinan period, she prayed to God to build her a house in paradise and save her from her wicked husband, Pharaoh.

"And Allâh has set forth an example for those who believe; the wife of Fir'aun (Pharaoh), when she said: "My Lord! Build for me a home with You in Paradise, and save me from Fir'aun (Pharaoh) and his work, and save me from the people who are Zâlimûn (polytheists, wrong-doers and disbelievers in Allâh)."

— Quran, Sura 66 (At-Tahrim), ayat 11 (Note: Quran, 66:11)

Asiyah represents the ideal of virtue as one of the four most outstanding women of the world and one of the four "ladies of heaven" that include: Mary, the mother of Jesus; Khadija, Muhammad's wife; and Fatima, Muhammad's daughter. Asiyah married Pharaoh as a sacrifice for her people, but never consummated it. She died a martyr's death after the tyrannical Pharaoh had killed many of the believers in the palace and she tried to avenge their deaths.

Ibn Kathir, part of the medieval tradition speaks of Pharaoh's wife as one of the prophet's "celestial wives". This is a supreme honor shared with the prophet's earthly wives and Mary. Asiyah is celebrated in the Islamic faith because she remained faithful to God even though her own husband, Pharaoh, thought of himself as God. She demonstrates a woman has the ability to exercise faith and believe in God, even against the wishes of a harsh husband.

== The Queen of Sheba (Bilqis) ==
The Quran speaks of the Queen of Sheba, also known as Bilqis. She was a sovereign ruler over her people who engaged in political negotiations set in the jahiliyya period. Her story takes place in Quran, surah 27 (Al-Naml): 22–44.

The hoopoe reported to Solomon of a Queen from Sheba who led her people in pagan rituals worshipping a Sun God instead of Allah.

"I found (there) a woman ruling over them and provided with every requisite; and she has a magnificent throne. (Note: Quran, 27:23) "I found her and her people worshipping the sun besides God: Satan has made their deeds seem pleasing in their eyes, and has kept them away from the Path,- so they receive no guidance,- (Note: Quran, 27:24)

Solomon wrote a letter to the Queen. The hoopoe delivered it to her palace leaving it on her chest while she was sleeping. Then Bilqis prepared presents for Solomon to test whether he was a "pious" or "worldly" prophet using a series of riddles. The queen set out to visit Solomon. Some say that Solomon magically moved her throne while others say that he wished for the throne and knew he had to acquire it before the Queen and her followers submitted to Allah.

She said: "Kings, when they enter a country, despoil it, and make the noblest of its people its meanest thus do they behave. (Note: Quran, 27:33)

"But I am going to send him a present, and (wait) to see with what (answer) return (my) ambassadors." (Note: Quran, 27:35)

So when she arrived, she was asked, "Is this thy throne?" She said, "It was just like this, and knowledge was bestowed on us in advance of this, and we have submitted to God (in Islam)." (Note: Quran, 27:2)

The Queen of Sheba submits to God with Solomon.

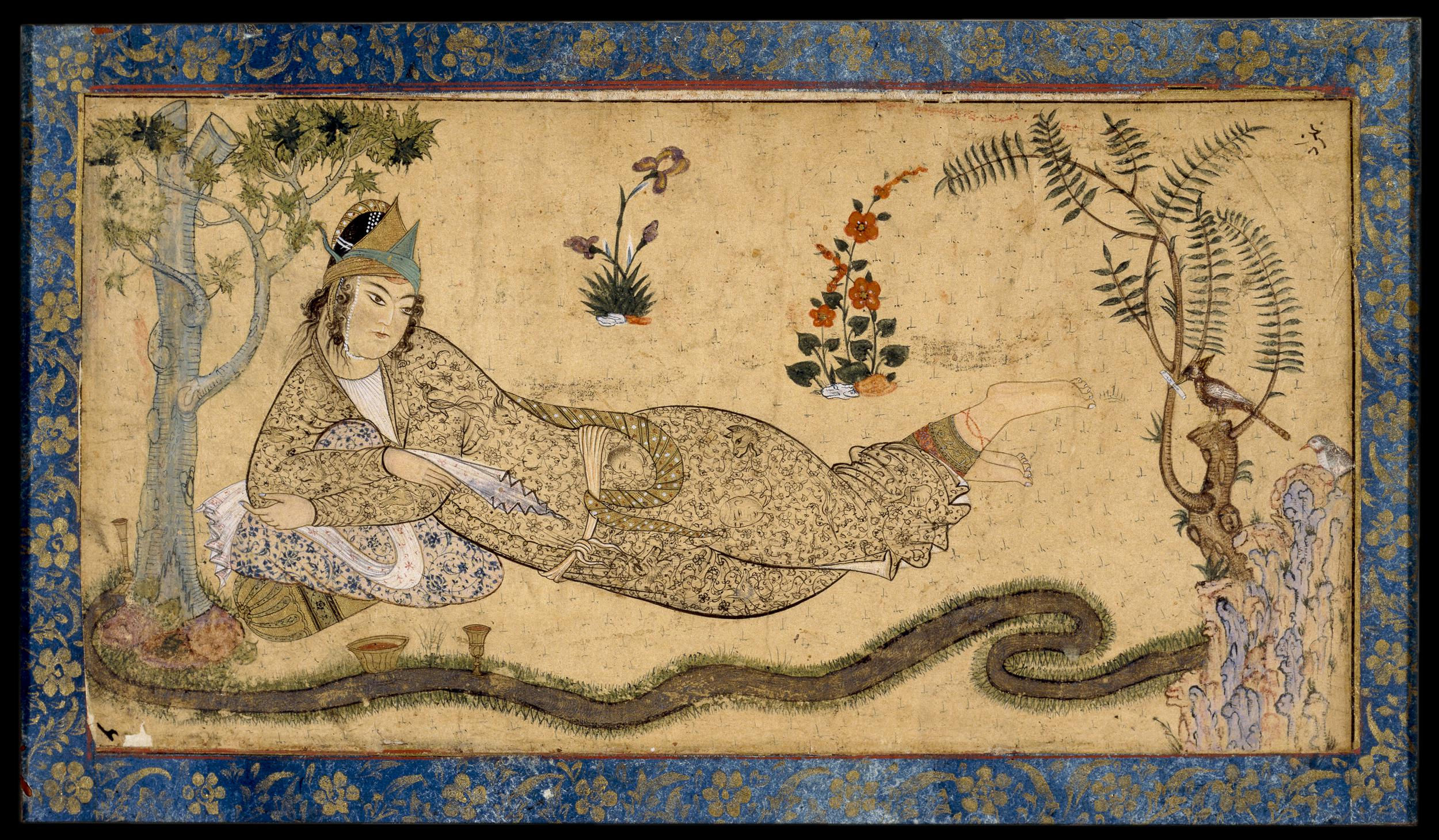
Belqeys, Queen of Sheba, one of the legendary figures in the Bible whose story is told without naming in the Quran, lying in a garden, facing a hoopoe, Solomon's messenger. Persian miniature (c. 1595).

Legend says that Solomon married Bilqis who then bore him a son. Some say she returned to Yemen as a queen and Solomon would visit her there for three days a month; others say that Solomon married her off to the king of Hamadan.

Many historians have attempted to humiliate or downplay the Queen of Sheba. Historian Mas'udi (10th Century) was convinced Bilqis could not have been fully human because she had a throne and led people. He said she had a human father but a jinn mother because he felt the need to attack Bilqis and question her humanity as a way to cope with the fact that she was a woman in political power. Additionally, to traditional Islamic interpreters, the story of the Queen of Sheba is difficult to grasp because of the way that a woman in political power falls outside of the traditional gender role of women in society. Classical Islamic authors shy away from addressing the question concerning the Queen of Sheba and the potential implications that it could have on female rulers.

Bilqis remains one of the more mysterious women in the world of scholarly interpretation. Some of the main issues that arise are how she became ruler, her competence in the role and how this can impact Islamic society. The beautiful Sheba married a tyrannical Himyarite king, got him drunk, cut off his head and convinced his ministers to declare their loyalty to her. She gained her position through proximity to a male ruler and deceived him using her female characteristics. Against Solomon, the Queen of Sheba demonstrates the ability to hold her own and validates her intelligence and good judgment, qualities typically reserved for men. However, her big fault is mistaking the glass for a pool and revealing her (hairy) legs, an act that she cannot redeem.

In contemporary terms, the story of the Queen of Sheba represents the righteousness of incorruptibility, exemplified when Solomon refused to be bribed by her elaborate gifts. The lesson that contemporaries draw is the ultimate submission to no one but God. Only God sees all the true believers equally and the ultimate submission should be to Him and not to anyone else, whether He is a leader or a prophet.

== Wife of Imran ==
In the Quran, the mother of the Virgin Mary (and thus Isa's grandmother) is not named in the Quran, but referred to in two passages of the narratives section as the wife of Imran, Imran being Joachim in Christianity. In the Christian tradition she is identified as Hannah. According to the Quran she invoked God for a child:

"Behold! a wife of Imran said: "O my Lord! I do dedicate into Thee what is in my womb for Thy special service: So accept this of me: For Thou hearest and knowest all things." "When she was delivered, she said: "O my Lord! Behold! I am delivered of a female child!"- and God knew best what she brought forth- "And whatever no wise is the male like the female. I have named her Mary, and I commend her and her offspring to Thy protection from Satan, the Rejected."

— Quran, Sura 3 (Al Imran), ayat 35–36 (Note: Quran, 3:35–36)

While the name Imran is attributed to both the father of Mary and the father of Moses and Aaron, interpreters explain that these two people are not to be confused. They are separated by a long time period—1,800 years according to some sources—and are called different names. The father of Mary is called Imran b. Mathhan/Matan while the father of Moses and Aaron is called Imran B. Yashar or Imran b. Qadith.

== Maryam (Mary) ==
Mary, the mother of Jesus and the sister of Aaron, is amongst the most important women in the Quran. Moreover, she is the only woman named in the Quran. She is described as one of the greatest women of all time in the Quran as well. Her name not only appears far more in the Quran than in the New Testament, but it is also the title of Sura 19, which discusses the annunciation, Jesus's birth and Jesus's first words, spoken before birth and in the cradle—"most other personal names used as titles of Quranic chapters are those of prophets." A hadith claims that Mary was consecrated to God, thus "escaping the pricking of the devil" at birth; this is said "to have played a role in the formation of the later Islamic doctrine of prophetic 'isma" (innate quality of 'impeccability', 'immunity from sin and error' of prophets).

As a young girl and a virgin, Mary stayed in the Mihrab, where she received "glad tidings of a word (kalima) from God" about her giving birth to a "pure son". In Sura 19, the angel Gabriel, sent by God, says to Mary, "I am only your Lord's messenger, to give you a pure boy." (Note: Quran, 19:20) The Quran also states the conception of Jesus by Mary was miraculous:

"Mary the daughter of Imran, who guarded her chastity; and We breathed into (her body) of Our spirit; and she testified to the truth of the words of her Lord and of His Revelations, and was one of the devout (servants)." (Note: Quran, 66:12)

Islamic scholars have long debated this happening, specifically the meaning of "spirit" (ruh) and the "word" (kalima) that Mary received from God. If she were informed of things to come by God's word, even through his angel, and infused with God's spirit, was Mary, then, a Quranic prophet? Scholars who focus on the literal meaning of the text have found proof of her prophethood, for "she differs from other Quranic women in nature and life experiences". Yet, perhaps because of her sex, Mary's prophethood is not widely accepted.

Nevertheless, Mary is still revered by all Muslims throughout the Islamic world. She is praised in the Quran: "Behold! the angels said: 'O Mary! God hath chosen thee and purified thee – chosen thee above the women of all nations.'" (Note: Quran, 3:42)

In Sura 21:91 Mary is revealed as a sign (ayah) from God: "And she who guarded her chastity. Then We breathed into her of Our spirit, and We made her and her son a sign for the worlds." (Note: Quran, 19:21) Sura 66 establishes Mary as the "example for believers" because of her chastity, obedience, and faith; however, "religious authorities have attempted to define the social applicability of Mary's qualities, that is, the facets of her model status suited for emulation." When Gabriel informs her of God's plan, Mary wonders: “How can I have a son when no man has ever touched me, nor am I unchaste?” (Note: Quran, 19:20) Later, "the pains of childbirth drove her to the trunk of a palm-tree. She said:“Alas! I wish I had died before this, and was a thing long forgotten!". (Note: Quran, 19:23) But she was comforted by God. (Note: Quran, 19:24-26)

Mary also appears in Quran 3, where she and her story are closely connected to that of her guardian, the prophet Zakariyya. The angel's words about the birth of John to Zakariyya (Sura 3:39) are almost identical to those on Jesus's (Sura 3:45). Similarly, both respond by questioning the message (Sura 3:40;47) and receive the same answer.

== Wives of Muhammad ==
The wives of Muhammad are known to Muslims as the "Mother of the believers", or in Arabic, umm'ul mu'mineen', coming from a Sura 33:6:

"The Prophet is closer to the Believers than their own selves, and his wives are their mothers." (Note: Quran, 33:6)

While Sura 4:3 limits Muslim men to having four wives, hadith maintain "that the prophet's right to unrestricted polygamy was a prerogative that God's sunna had extended to all prophets: a 'natural right' of His spokesmen on earth." They are mentioned in several places in the Quran, but never by name, making the hadith as scripturalist interpretation most important, yet they "are not like any [other] women." Muhammad's wives play a prominent role in Islam and Muslim practices; "their reception of specific divine guidances, occasioned by their proximity to Muhammad, endows them with special dignity." They form the basis for the status of women in Islam and are thus important for gender debates and study.

Only a few "are consistently presented as key figures in the hadith accounts of contexts of specific revelations ('occasions of revelation', Asbab al-nuzul)". Stowasser states: "The Quranic legislation directed at the Prophet's wives, then, is entirely of Medinan provence and belongs into the last six or seven years of the prophet's life." Sura 33:50 outlines the lawful "categories of females" that are able to marry Muhammad: "wives with whom the Prophet contracted marriage involving a dower; female prisoners of war (slaves) who fell to him as part of his share of spoils; both paternal and also maternal cousins who had migrated with him to Medina; and "a believing woman, if she gives herself to the Prophet and [He] also wishes to marry her(Al-Quran 33:50)."

Except Aisha, Muhammad only married widows and divorced women. Aisha bint Abi Bakr is often thought of as the prophet's favorite wife. She is linked to the Quran's injunctions against slander in Sura 24:11–26, for her involvement in "the affair of the lie [or, slander]" (al-ifk), in which she was falsely accused of "being with" another man, Safwan ibn al-Mu'attal al-Sulami. She is considered to be the first woman to choose "God and His Prophet" over "the world and its adornment". In Sura 33:28–29, God ordered Muhammad's wives to make a decision as to their preference, after Muhammad was annoyed by the wives' growing desire for material possessions. Aisha is also important in mainstream Sunni Islam.

Muhammad's wives were the first women to follow the practice of veiling with a Hijab. Sura 33:53, commonly called the "hijab verse," states that if "believers" want something from Muhammad's wives, they must ask "from behind a hijab"; it also forbids "believers" from marrying Muhammad's wives after him. (Note: Quran, 33:53)

Sura 33:32–34 declare that women of Muhammad are not like other women and so specifies special etiquette for them.

"O women of prophet! You are not like other women; if you remain pious then do not be so much polite in speaking so that he who has disease in his heart make a hope and speak in recognized manner. And stay in your homes, do not show of your adornments like those in beginning Jahiliyya, offer Salat and zakah."

== Daughters of Muhammad ==
Muhammad, had four daughters with his wife, Khadija bint Khuwaylid: Zainab, Umm Kulthum, Ruqayyah, and Fatimah.

The Quran speaks of Muhammad's daughters in Sura 33:59.

"O Prophet! tell thy wives and daughters, and the believing women, that they should draw over themselves some of their outer garments (when in public): that is most convenient, that they should be known (as decent women) and not annoyed. And God is Oft-Forgiving, Most Merciful." (Note: Quran, 33:59)

The Quran refers to the daughters as a whole, banatika, never identifying them by name.

== The woman who complained to God about her husband ==
The Quran speaks of The woman who complained to God about her husband in Sura 58 (Al-Mujadila), but not by name. Hadith provides her name, Khawlah bint Tha'labah.

"God has indeed heard (and accepted) the statement of the woman who pleads with thee concerning her husband and carries her complaint (in prayer) to God: and God (always) hears the arguments between both of you: for God hears and sees (all things)." (Note: Quran, 58:1)

The verses that follow are to restore her rights (as well as those of any other woman in her position), when a husband mistreats his wife. Muslims refer to this woman and her story to express the mercy of God.

== The woman who untwisted her spun thread after it was strong ==
The Quran mentions the woman who untwisted her spun thread after it was strong in Sura 16 (an-Nahl), but not by name.

"And do not be like she who untwisted her spun thread after it was strong [by] taking your oaths as [means of] deceit between you because one community is more plentiful [in number or wealth] than another community. Allah only tries you thereby. And He will surely make clear to you on the Day of Resurrection that over which you used to differ."

— Quran, Sura 16 (An-Nahl), ayat 92 (Note: Quran, 16:92)

Untying a thread that has been tightly twisted, in the context of the Qur'an (Surah An-Nahl verse 92), is a parable for someone who breaks a promise or oath that has been made, like a woman unraveling a strong thread.

Tafsir al-Jalalayn claims she was "an imbecile Meccan woman who used to spin all day and then undo it".

== Wife of Abu Lahab ==
The Quran mentions the wife of Abu Lahab in Sura 111 Al-Masad, but not by name. Hadith claims that her name is Umm Jamil bint Harb and the sister of Abu Sufyan. It is said that she insulted and ridiculed Muhammad, would set up thorns in his path to bleed and once placed the stomach of a camel on his back as he was prostrating while he and Abu Bakr praying in the Ka'ba and, unaware that Muhammad was present, spoke badly of him and his religion. Therefore, the Quran describes how she will be punished, alongside her husband, in Hell for hurting Muhammad.

"His wife shall carry The (crackling) wood as fuel. A twisted rope of palm-leaf fibre Round her (own) neck."

(Note: Quran, 111:4–5)

== See also ==
- Women in Islam
- Mary in Islam
- Houri
- List of characters and names mentioned in the Quran
- Sahaba in the Quran
- Women as theological figures
- Women in the Bible
