= Al-Waqi'a =

56th chapter of the Qur'an

Surah 56 of the Quran
الواقعة Al-Wāqiʻah The Event
- Qira'ah; English text
- Classification: Meccan
- Position: Juzʼ 27
- Hizb no.: 54
- No. of verses: 96
- No. of words: 428
- No. of letters: 1723

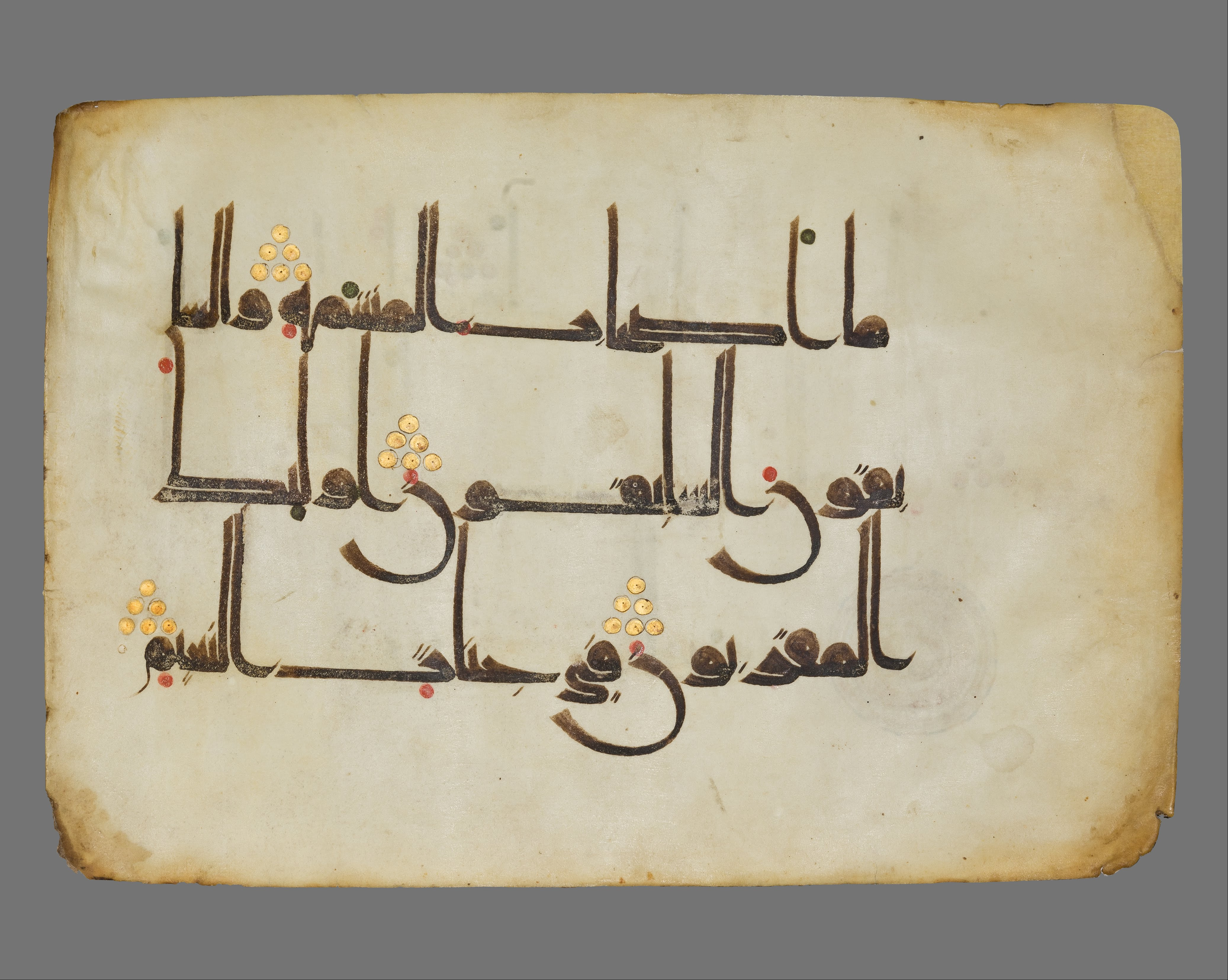
Page from the Qur'an manuscript with the fragment of the surah Al-Waqi'a. Kufic script, North Africa, 10th century. Museum of Islamic Art, Doha

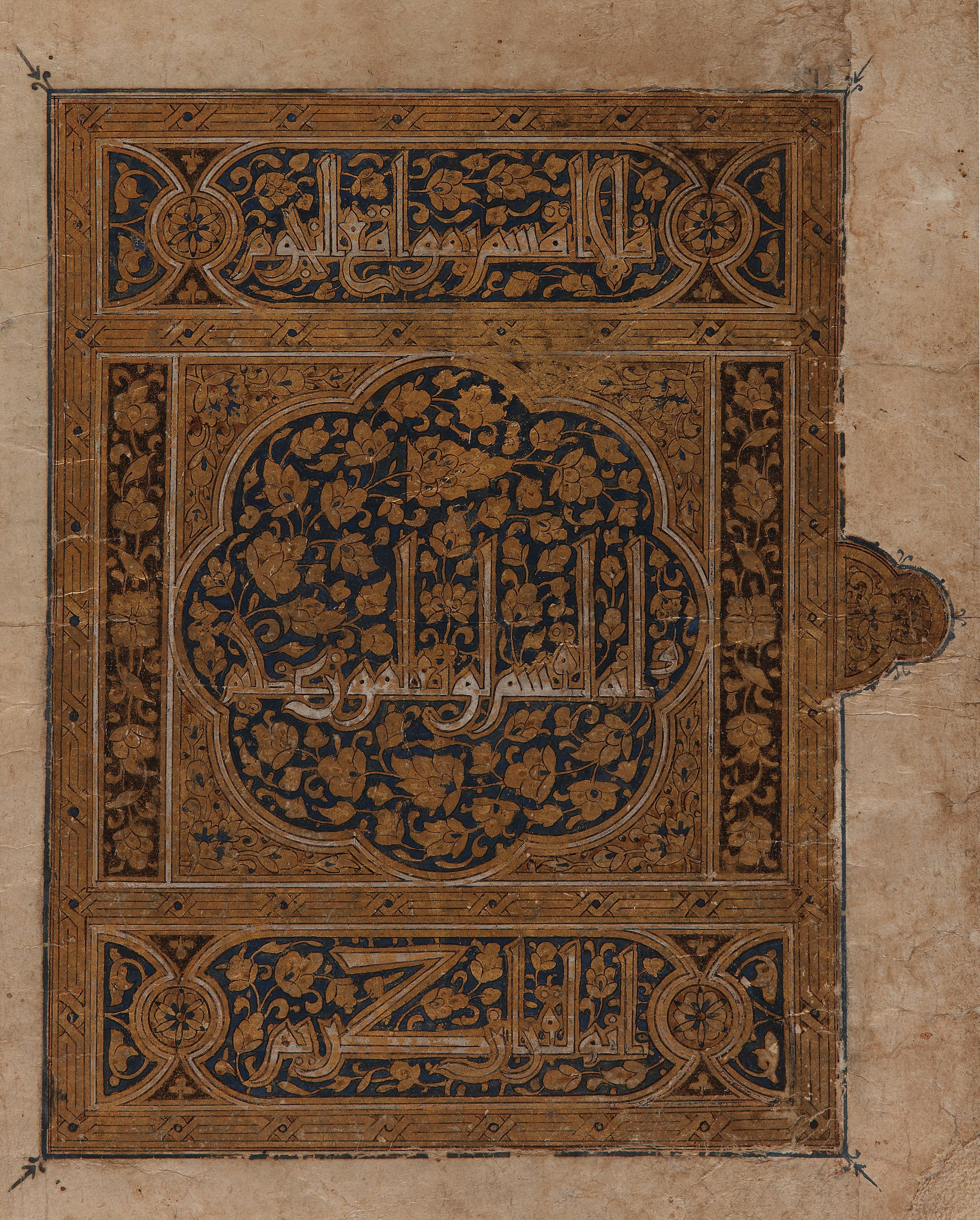
Right-hand half of a double-page frontispiece of the Mamluk Qur'an with verses 75-77 of the surah Al-Waqi'a in kufic script. This frontispiece marks the beginning of the 3rd section of the surah. Egypt, late 14th century. Freer Gallery of Art

Al-Wāqiʻa (Arabic: الواقعة; "The Inevitable" or "The Event") is the 56th surah (chapter) of the Quran. Muslims believe it was revealed in Mecca (see Meccan surah), specifically around 7 years before the Hijrah (622), the migration of Muhammad to Medina. The total number of verses in this surah is 96. It mainly discusses the afterlife according to Islam, and the different fates people will face in it.

== Summary ==
The afterlife (akhirah) is the main topic discussed in the chapter. Picking up from the preceding chapter, Ar-Rahman, which discusses the rewards of Paradise (jannah), this chapter also mentions them and then contrasts them with the punishment of hell. The chapter also distinguishes the three classes of people in the afterlife, "the foremost", "the companions of the right" and "the companions of the left": the first two groups will enter paradise while the companions of the left will go to hell. Here, "the right" is associated with goodness, the righteous will be seated to the right of God's throne and receive their records of deeds in their right hand. The "foremost" refers to a special group of people who will have an even better fate than the companions of the right in the afterlife. Quranic commentators differ on understanding who the foremost is. They variously identify the foremost with the prophets, the saints, the truthful, the martyrs, the first to accept Islam, and others.

== Ayat (verses) ==
- 1-2 The coming of the Judgment Day inevitable
- 3-7 Its terrors described
- 8-11 Its coming shall separate men into three classes
- 12-39 Joys of the Muslim heaven described
- 40-56 The punishment of the wicked in hell depicted
- 57-73 Arguments for the resurrection of the dead drawn from God’s work in creation and providence
- 74-81 Oath by the stars that the Qurán is divinely-inspired
- 82-96 Men should believe in God since they cannot save the dying from death

== Revelation history ==
According to Quranic commentators, the chapter is a Meccan sura, that is, it was revealed during the Meccan period of Muhammad's prophethood. Some commentators, although not in the majority, argue that part of it was revealed during the Medinan period. Some of such commentators maintain that verses 39–40 are the verses that was from the Medinan period, while some say 81–82, and others say 83.

The traditional Egyptian chronology puts the chapter as the 41st chapter by the order of revelation (after At-Tur), while the Nöldeke Chronology (by the orientalist Theodor Nöldeke) puts it as the 46th. The chapter's position in the Quran, which is not determined by the revelation order, is as the 56th chapter, right after Ar-Rahman which discusses partly related topic.

== Exegesis ==
=== Q56:22 Houri ===
56:22 And (there will be) Houri with wide lovely eyes.

According to Ibn Kathir, in paradise there will be,

"Houri (fair females) with wide lovely eyes, like preserved pearls. Therefore, God's statement, (Verily, We have created them), meaning, in the other life, after they became old in this life, they were brought back while virgin, youthful, being delightfully passionate with their husbands, beautiful, kind and cheerful".

In The Message of The Qur'an, Muhammad Asad asserts that the "noun hur - rendered as 'companions pure' - is a plural of both ahwar (masculine) and hawra' (female), either of which describes a person distinguished by hawar', which latter term primarily denotes 'intense whiteness of the eyeballs and lustrous black of the iris'. Asad as well as Yusuf Ali and Marmaduke Pickthall translate this verse as:

And [with them will be their] companions pure, most beautiful of eye, like unto pearls [still] hidden in their shells. [And this will be] a reward for what they did [in life].

The Enlightening Commentary into the Light of the Holy Qur'an says, "the people of Paradise shall have spouses from amongst houri with fair complexions and wide black eyes who are preserved like pearls in shells".

=== Virtues ===
According to a narration attributed to Ja'far al-Sadiq, whoever recites Surah Al-Waqi'a every Thursday night will be loved by God and become beloved among all people. He will also never experience hardship, poverty, or any of the world's disasters, and will be among the companions of Ali ibn Abi Talib. This Surah is specifically dedicated to the Commander of the Faithful, and no one shares this virtue with him.

According to another narration from Ja’far al-Sadiq: whoever desires Paradise and its description should read Surah Al-Waqiah, and whoever wants to see the description of the Fire of Hell should recite Surahs Al-Sajdah and Luqman.

== Bibliography ==
- Seyyed Hossein Nasr; Caner K. Dagli; Maria Massi Dakake; Joseph E.B. Lumbard; Mohammed Rustom, eds. (2015). The Study Quran: A New Translation and Commentary. New York, NY: HarperCollins. ISBN 978-0-06-112586-7.
