= Q66 =

Q66 may refer to:

- Q66 (New York City bus)
- At-Tahrim, a surah of the Quran
- French submarine Berthelot
