= Jannah =

Islamic concept of Paradise

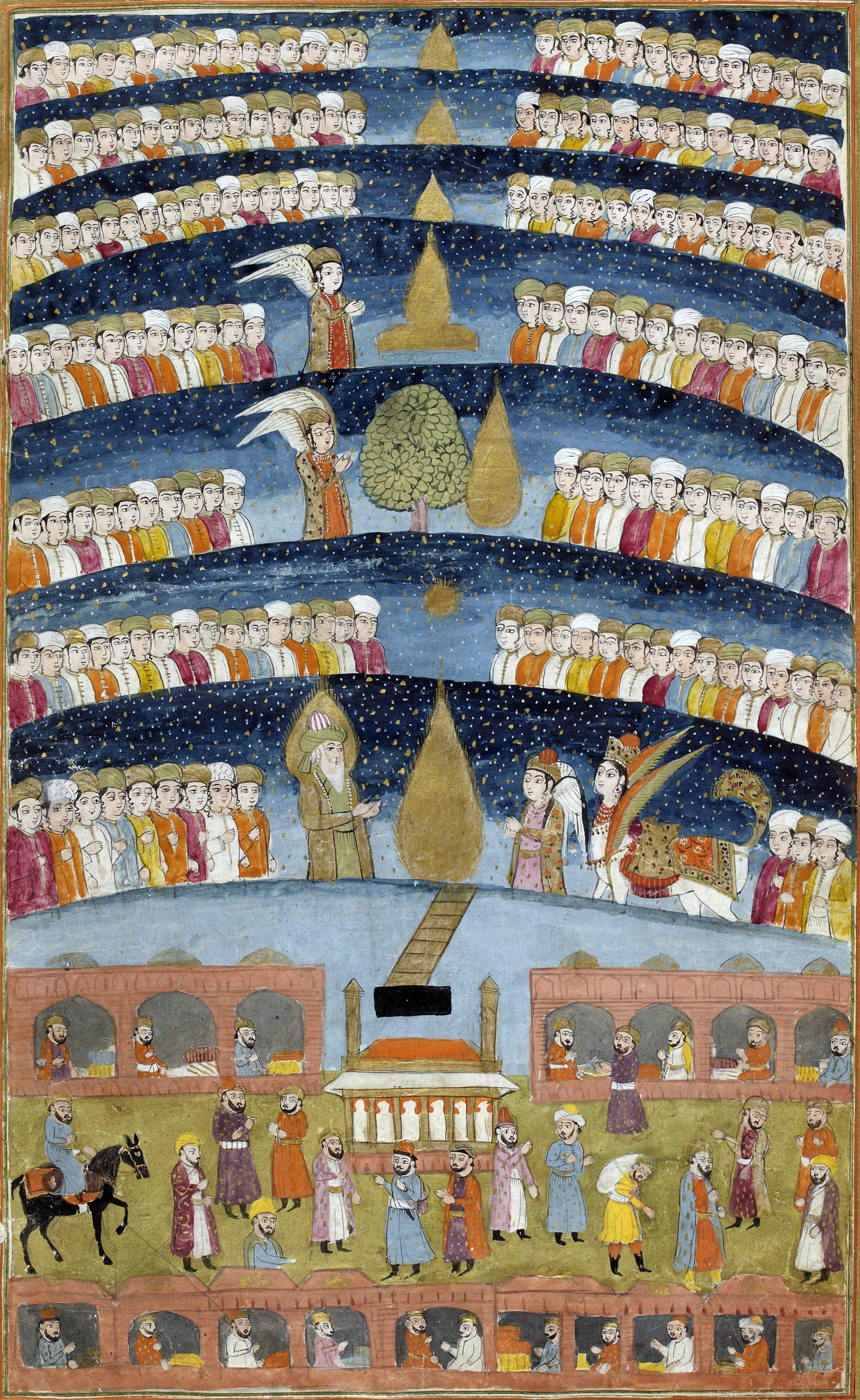
A Kashmiri depiction of Jannah, 1808

In Islam, Jannah (Arabic: جَنَّةٍ, romanized: janna, IPA: [d͡ʒan.na], pl. جَنات jannāt, lit. 'garden') is the place of the righteous in the afterworld, their final and permanent abode. According to one count, the word appears 147 times in the Qur'an. Belief in the afterlife is one of the six articles of faith in Islam and is a place in which the righteous will enjoy pleasure. Jannah is believed to have several levels, the higher the more desirable and higher in prestige and pleasure. The afterlife experiences are described as physical, psychic, and spiritual.

Jannah is described with physical pleasures such as gardens, beautiful houris, wine that has no aftereffects, and "divine pleasure". Their reward of pleasure will vary according to the righteousness of the person. The characteristics of jannah often have direct parallels with those of jahannam. The pleasure and delights of jannah described in the Qu'ran, are matched by the pain and horror of jahannam.

Jannah is also referred to as the abode of Adam and Eve before their expulsion. Muslims believe jannah co-exists with the temporal world, rather than being created after Judgement Day. Humans may not pass the boundaries to the afterlife, but the afterworld may interact with the temporal world of humans.

== Terminology ==
Jannah is found frequently in the Qur'an (2:30, 78:12) and often translated as "heaven" in the sense of an abode in which believers are rewarded in afterlife. Another word, سماء samāʾ (usually pl. samāwāt) also found frequently in the Quran and translated as "heaven", has the meaning of sky above or the celestial sphere. (It is often used in the phrase as-samawat wal-ard ٱلسَّمَٰوَٰتِ وَٱلۡأَرۡضِ "the heavens and the earth", an example being Qu'ran 38:10.) The Qu'ran describes both samāʾ and jannah as being above this world.

Jannah is also frequently translated as "paradise", but another term with a more direct connection to that term is also found, Firdaus (Arabic: فردوس), the literal term meaning paradise, Firdaus is used in Qu'ran 18:107 and 23:11 and also designates the highest level of heaven. In Persian the word Pardis (Persian: پردیس), is the source of the English word "paradise".

In contrast to jannah, the words jahannam, an-Nār, jaheem, saqar, and other terms are used to refer to the concept of hell. There are many Arabic words for both heaven and hell that also appear in the Qu'ran and in the hadith. Most of them have become part of Islamic beliefs.

Jannah is also used as the name of the Garden of Eden in which Adam and Hawa (Eve) dwelt.

== Salvation/inhabitants ==
Diagram of "Plain of Assembly" (Ard al-Hashr) on the Day of Judgment, from an autograph manuscript of Futuhat al-Makkiyya by Sufi mystic and Muslim philosopher Ibn Arabi, ca. 1238. Shown are the 'Arsh (Throne of God), pulpits for the righteous (al-Aminun), seven rows of angels, Gabriel (al-Ruh), A'raf (the Barrier), the Pond of Abundance, al-Maqam al-Mahmud (the Praiseworthy Station; where Muhammad will stand to intercede for the faithful), Mizan (the Scale), As-Sirāt (the Bridge), Jahannam (Hell), and Marj al-Jannat (Meadow of Paradise).

Scholars do not all agree on who will end up in jannah, and the criteria for whether or not they will. Issues include whether all Muslims, even those who've committed major sins, will end up in jannah; and whether any non-Muslims will go there.

=== Inhabitants according to Quran ===
The Quran specifies the qualities for those allowed to inhabit jannah (according to Smith and Haddad) as: "those who refrain from doing evil, keep their duty, have faith in God's revelations, do good works, are truthful, penitent, heedful, and contrite of heart, those who feed the needy and orphans and who are prisoners for God's sake." Another source (Sebastian Günther and Todd Lawson) gives as the basic criterion for salvation in the afterlife more detail on articles of faith: the belief in the oneness of God (tawḥīd), angels, revealed books, messengers, as well as repentance to God, and doing good deeds (amal salih). All these qualities are qualified by the doctrine that ultimately salvation can only be attained through God's judgment.

==== Angels, devils, and jinns ====
The idea that jinn as well as humans could find salvation was widely accepted, based on the Quran (Q.55:74) where the saved are promised maidens "untouched before by either men or jinn" – suggesting to classical scholars al-Suyūṭī and al-Majlisī that jinn also are provided their own kind of houri maidens in paradise. Like humans, their destiny in the hereafter depends on whether they accept God's guidance. Angels, on the other hand, because they are not subject to desire and so are not subject to temptation, work in paradise serving the "blessed" (humans and jinn) guiding them, officiating marriages, conveying messages, praising them, etc. The devils cannot return to paradise, because Islamic scripture states that their father, the fallen angel Iblis, was banished, but never suggests that he or his offspring were forgiven or promised to return.

The eschatological destiny of these creatures is summarized in the prophetic tradition: "One kind of beings will dwell in Paradise, and they are the angels; one kind will dwell in Hell, and they are the demons; and another kind will dwell some in Paradise and some in Hell, and those are the jinn and the humans."

==== Salvation of non-Muslims ====
Muslim scholars disagree about exact criteria for salvation of Muslim and non-Muslim. Although most agree that Muslims will be finally saved – shahids (martyrs) who die in battle, are expected to enter paradise immediately after death – non-Muslims are another matter.

Muslim scholars arguing in favor of non-Muslims' being able to enter paradise cite the verse:

"Indeed, the believers, Jews, Christians, and Sabians—whoever ˹truly˺ believes in Allah and the Last Day and does good will have their reward with their Lord. And there will be no fear for them, nor will they grieve."

— Surah Al-Baqara 2:62

Those arguing against non-Muslim salvation regard this verse to have applied only until the arrival of Muhammad, after which it was abrogated by another verse:

"Whoever seeks a way other than Islam, it will never be accepted from them, and in the Hereafter they will be among the losers."

— Surah Al Imran 3:85

Historically, the Ash'ari school of theology was known for having an optimistic perspective on salvation for Muslims, but a very pessimistic view of those who heard about Muhammad and his character, yet rejected him. The Maturidi school also generally agreed that even sinners among Muslims would eventually enter paradise, but its unclear whether they thought only Muslim would go to jannah, or if non-Muslims who understood and obeyed "God's universal law" would be saved also. The Muʿtazila school held that free will and individual accountability was necessary for divine justice, thus rejecting the idea of intercession (shafa'a) by Muhammad on behalf of sinners. Unlike other schools it believed Jannah would be created only after Judgement Day. Like most Sunni, Shia Islam hold that all Muslims will eventually go to jannah, and like the Ash'ari school, believe heedless and stubborn unbelievers will go to hell, while those ignorant of the truth of Islam but "truthful to their own religion", will not. Modernist scholars Muhammad Abduh and Rashid Rida rejected the notion that the People of the Book are excluded from jannah, referring to another verse.

- ˹Divine grace is˺ neither by your wishes nor those of the People of the Book! Whoever commits evil will be rewarded accordingly, and they will find no protector or helper besides Allah. But those who do good—whether male or female—and have faith will enter Paradise and will never be wronged ˹even as much as˺ the speck on a date stone. (Q.4:123–124)

== Descriptions, details, and organization ==
=== Sources ===
Sources on jannah include the Quran, Islamic traditions, creeds, Quranic commentaries (tafsir) and "other theological writing". "Third Islamic century traditionalists amplified the eschatological material enormously particularly in areas on where "the Quran is relatively silent" about the nature of Jannah. Some of the more popular Sunni manuals of eschatology are Kitāb al-rūḥ of Ibn Qayyim al-Jawzīya and al-Durra al-fākhira ft kashf 'ulūm al-ākhira of Abǖ Ḥāmid al-Ghazālī.

=== Delights ===
Inside jannah, the Quran says its inhabitants "will have whatever they wish for, forever"; (Q.25:16). Other verses give more specific descriptions of the delights of paradise:

'And whoever is in awe of standing before their Lord will have two Gardens
... ˹Both will be˺ with lush branches.
... In each ˹Garden˺ will be two flowing springs.
... In each will be two types of every fruit.
... Those ˹believers˺ will recline on furnishings lined with rich brocade. And the fruit of both Gardens will hang within reach.
... In both ˹Gardens˺ will be maidens of modest gaze, who no human or jinn has ever touched before.
... Those ˹maidens˺ will be ˹as elegant˺ as rubies and coral.
... Is there any reward for goodness except goodness?
... And below these two ˹Gardens˺ will be two others.
... Both will be dark green.
... In each will be two gushing springs.
... In them are fruits, palm trees, and pomegranates.
... In all Gardens will be noble, pleasant mates
...˹They will be˺ maidens [houris] with gorgeous eyes, reserved in pavilions.
.... No human or jinn has ever touched these ˹maidens˺ before.
... All ˹believers˺ will be reclining on green cushions and splendid carpets.
Then which of your Lord's favours will you both deny? (Q.55:46–76, Mustafa Khattab, the Clear Quran)

Smith and Haddad summarize some of the Quranic pleasures:

Choirs of angels will sing in Arabic (the only language used in paradise), the streets will be as familiar as those of the dwellers' own countries, inhabitants will eat and drink 100 times more than earthly bodies could hold and will enjoy it 100 times more, their rooms will have thick carpets and brocade sofas, on Fridays they will go to a market to receive new clothing to enhance their beauty, they will not suffer bodily ailments or be subject to functions such as sleeping, spitting, or excreting; they will be forever young.

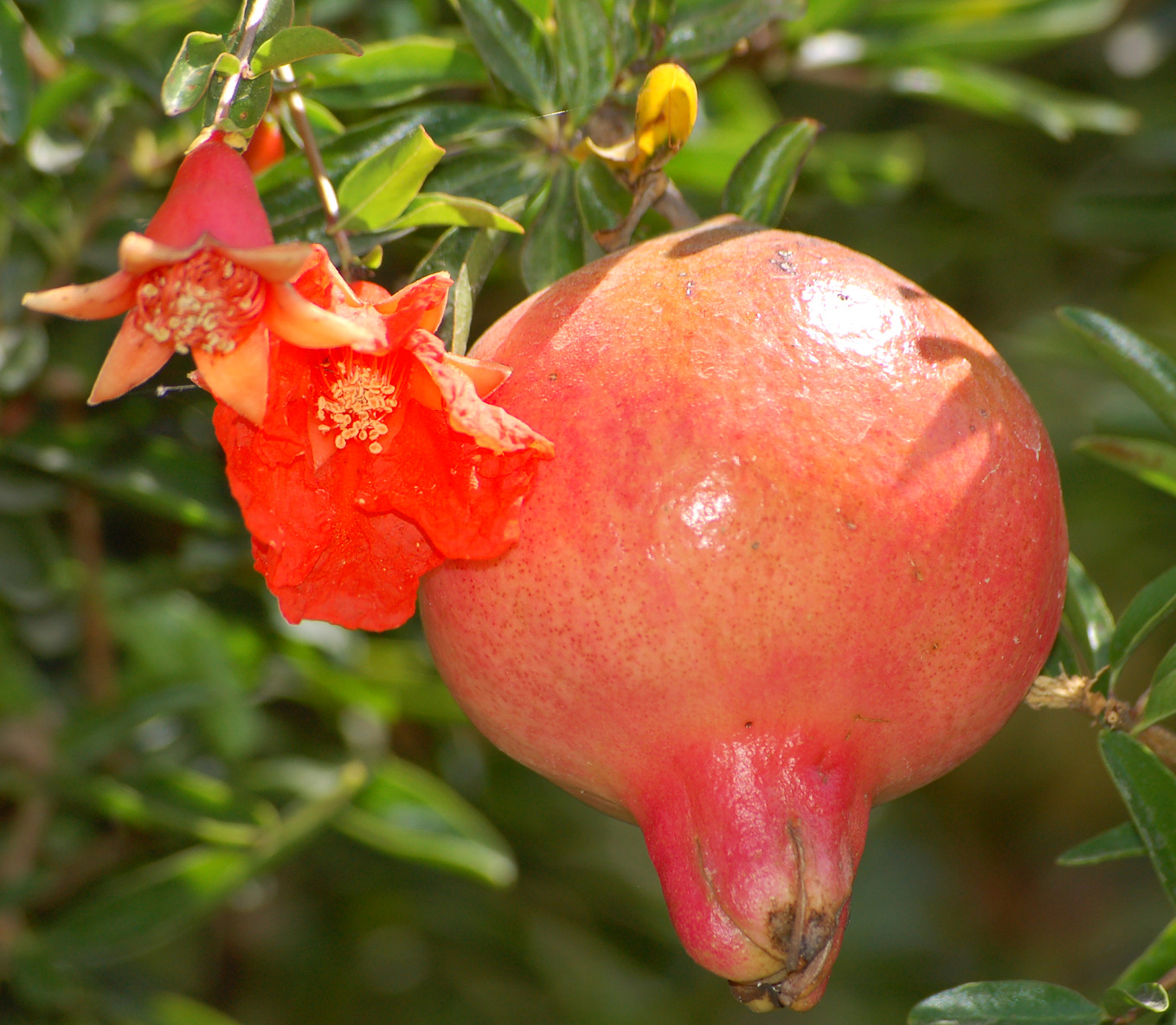
Pomegranate flower and fruit, mentioned as a fruit in paradise in the Quran (55:68). Therefore, it is used as an ingredient in a dessert (Ashure) used to commemorate prophetic events.

As the gates of jannah are opened for the arrival of the saved into jannah they will be greeted (Q.39:73) by angels announcing, "Peace be upon you, because ye have endured with patience; how excellent a reward is paradise!" (Q13:24).

Inside there will be neither too much heat nor bitter cold; there will be fountains (Q.88:10), abundant shade from spreading tree branches green with foliage (Q.53:14–16, also Q.36:56–57). They will be passed a cup (Q.88:10–16) full of wine "wherefrom they will get [no] aching of the head” (hangovers) [Q.56:19], and "which leads to no idle talk or sinfulness" (Q.52:23), (Note: The Quran says in reference to heavenly wine drinking: "Round them will be passed a cup of pure wine ... Neither will they have Ghoul (any kind of hurt, abdominal pain, headache, a sin) from that nor will they suffer intoxication therefrom” ([al-Saaffaat 37:45–47). Smith & Haddad say "While the Qur'an insists that no aftereffects will occur from imbibing the wines of the Garden's rivers, the possibilities of heavenly intoxication have afforded the type of fanciful description found in Abū Layth al-Samarqandī, reportedly from Muhammad: On Saturday God Most High will provide drink [from the water of the Garden]. On Sunday they will drink its honey, on Monday they will drink its milk, on Tuesday they will drink its wine. When they have drunk, they will become intoxicated; when they become intoxicated, they will fly for a thousand years till they reach a great mountain of fine musk from beneath which emanates Salsabil. They will drink [of it] and that will be Wednesday. Then they will fly for a thousand years till they reach a place overtopping a mountain ...) and every meat (Q.52:22) and trees from which an unceasing supply of fruits grow (Q.36:56–57), "that looks similar ˹but tastes different˺"; (Q.2:25) adornment with golden and pearl bracelets (Q.35:33) and green garments of fine silk and brocade (Q.18:31); attended upon by [ghulman] (Q.52:24), servant-boys (eternal youths (56:17, 76:19)) like spotless pearls (Q.52:24).

While the Quran never mentions God being in the Garden, the faithful are promised the opportunity to gaze upon His face, something the inhabitants of the Fire will be deprived of. (Note: Some early Muslims, such as Muʿtazila and Jahmiyah, opposed to anthropomorphism, denied this possibility. "The majority opinion, however, rejected ... opposition to the possibility of the ru'ya Allah, following the conclusions of the school of al Ash'ari" and argued that "the precise means" of that vision of God "as well as its content must for now be unexplainable ...")

Inhabitants will rejoice in the company of any parents, spouses, and children who were admitted to paradise (Q52:21) —conversing and recalling the past.

One day in paradise is considered equal to a thousand years on earth. Palaces are made from bricks of gold, silver, pearls, among other things. Traditions also note the presence of horses and camels of "dazzling whiteness", along with other creatures. Large trees whose shades are ever deepening, mountains made of musk, between which rivers flow in valleys of pearl and ruby.

Non-physical pleasures

While the Quran is full of "graphic" descriptions of the "physical pleasures" for the inhabitants of the Garden, it also states that the "acceptance [riḍwān] from God" felt by the inhabitants "is greater" than the pleasure of the Gardens (Q.9:72), the true beauty of paradise, the greatest of all rewards, surpassing all other joys. On the day on which God brings the elect near to his throne (‘arsh), "some faces shall be shining in contemplating their Lord".

The visit is described as Muhammad leading the men and Fatimah leading the women to approach the Throne, "which is described as a huge esplanade of musk". As "the veil of light before the Throne lifts, God appears with the radiance of the full moon, and His voice can be heard saying, 'Peace be upon you.'"

Hadith include stories of the saved being served an enormous feast where "God Himself is present to offer to His faithful ones delicacies kneaded into a kind of pancake". In another series of narratives, God personally invites the inhabitants of Jannah "to visit with Him every Friday".

Houri

"Perhaps no aspect of Islamic eschatology has so captured the imagination" of both "Muslims and non-Muslims" as houri (ḥūr). Men will get untouched Houri in paradise (Q55:56), virgin companions of equal age (56:35–38) and have large, beautiful eyes (37:48). Houri have occasioned "spectacular elaborations" by later Islamic eschatological writers, but also "some derision by insensitive Western observers and critics of Islam".

The Quran also states the saved "will have pure spouses," (without indicating gender) (Q2:25, Q4:57), accompanied by any children that did not go to Jahannam (Q52:21), and attended to by servant-boys with the spotless appearance similar to a protected pearls (Q52:24).

Despite the Quranic description above, Houris have been described as women who will accompany faithful Muslims in Paradise. Muslim scholars differ as to whether they refer to the believing women of this world or a separate creation, with the majority opting for the latter. (Note: Lange argues that "purified spouses" cannot refer to houris as they are heavenly creatures not in need of ritual cleansing.)

=== Size, geography and structure ===
Layers of Jannah according to different scholars (in descending order)
| al-Suyuti | Kitāb aḥwāl al-qiyāma |
|---|---|
| al-firdaws (Paradise) | jannāt ʿadn ("garden of Eden") white pearl |
| jannat al-na'im ("garden of bliss") | jannat al-firdaws red gold |
| jannat al-ma'wa ("garden of refuge") | Jannat al na'īm ("garden of bliss") white silver |
| jannat 'adn ("garden of Eden") | jannat al-khuld ("garden of eternity") yellow coral |
| dar al-khuld ("abode of eternity") | jannat al-ma'wan ("garden of refuge") green chrysolite |
| dar al-salam ("abode of peace") | dar al-salam ("abode of peace") red sapphire |
| dar al-jalal ("abode of glory") | dar al-jinān ("abode of the garden") white pearl |
| Source: al-Suyuti; | Source: Kitāb aḥwāl al-qiyāma |

The Qur'an describes paradise as a "great kingdom" (Q.76:20) stretching out over and above the entire world, and "lofty" (Q.69:22).

Paradise is "as vast as the heavens and the earth" (Q.3:133). There are four rivers: one each of water, milk, honey, and wine (47:15). (They were later identified as Kawthar, Kafur, Tasnim, and Salsabil.) (Note: The names given the rivers come from the Quran, where they are identified as sources of water with religious significance, but not as rivers of honey, wine, etc. in paradise.: Q.76:5 on the water of Kafur, of which the righteous shall drink; Q.83:27–28 on the waters of Tasnim drunk by those brought near to God; Q.76:18 on the water of a spring named Salsabil; and; Q.108:1, which speaks only of abundance [kawthar]. The last is sometimes applied to a river running through the Garden and sometimes to the hawq of Muhammad.)

Despite the details given in the Quran about jannah/garden, "nowhere" is there found "an ordered picture of the structure" of the abode. "For the most part Islamic theology has not concerned itself with questions about the location and structure of the Garden and the Fire on the understanding that only God knows these particulars."

==== Layers/levels ====
On the basis of "several scriptural suggestions", scholars have created "a very detailed structure" of paradise, but there is more than one, and not all of the traditions on location of paradise "are easily pictured or indeed mutually reconcilable".

For example, Qu'ran 23:17 states "We created above you seven paths [Ṭarā'iq]" from which is drawn a heaven of seven tiers (which is also "a structure familiar to Middle Eastern cosmogony since the early Babylonian days"). Another school of thought insists Jannah actually has "eight layers or realms" as the Quran gives "eight different names ... for the abode of the blessed". (Note: "Five descriptions are used" in the Quran "in conjunction with Janna, singular or plural: the garden of eternity [al-khuld] (Qu'ran 25:15), the gardens of Firdaws (Q 18: 107), the gardens of refuge [al-ma'wan] (Qu'ran 32:19), the gardens of bliss [al-na'im] (Qu'ran 5:65), and the gardens of Eden (Qu'ran 9:72). Two are in conjunction with dlir, abode: abode of peace [sallim] (Qu'ran 6:127) and abode of repose [qarlir] (Qu'ran 40:39); the last is 'iliytn (Qu'ran 83:18).)

Some descriptions of jannah/the garden indicate that the most spacious and highest part of the Garden firdaws, which is directly under the throne and the place from which the four rivers of paradise flow. Others say the uppermost portion is either the garden of Eden or 'Iliyi and that is the second level from the top.

Another possibility is that there are four separate realms of the blessed, of which either Firdaws or Eden is the uppermost. This is based on Surah 55, which talks about two gardens: ("As for him who fears standing before his Lord there are two gardens [jannatan]") [S 55:46). All descriptions following this verse are of things in pairs, (i.e. in the Arabic dual form) – two fountains flowing, fruit of every kind in pairs, beside these two other gardens with two springs (Q.55:62,66).

Still others have proposed that the seven levels suggested by the Qur'an are the seven heavens, above which is the Garden or final abode of felicity, while many see paradise as only one entity with many names.

One version of the layered garden conceptualization describes the highest level of heaven (al-firdaws) as being said to be so close that its inhabitants could hear the sound of God's throne above. This exclusive location is where the messengers, prophets, Imams, and martyrs (shahids) dwell. Al-Suyuti and Kitāb aḥwāl al-qiyāma each gives names to the levels that do not always coincide (see table to right).

Gates of Jannah according to different sources
| Soubhi El-Saleh | Huda Omam Khalid |
|---|---|
| salat (prayer) | Bāb al-Ṣalāh: For those who were punctual in prayer |
| jihad (struggle in the cause of islam) | Bāb al-Jihād: For those who took part in jihad |
| almsgiving | Bāb al-Ṣadaqah: For those who gave charity more often |
| sawm (fasting) | Bāb al-Rayyān: For those who fasted (siyam) |
| repentance | Bāb al-Ḥajj: For those who participated in the annual pilgrimage |
| self-control | Bāb al-Kāẓimīn al-Ghayẓ wa-al-‘Āfīn ‘an al-Nās: For those who withheld their anger and forgave others |
| submission | Bāb al-Imān: For those who by virtue of their faith are saved from reckoning and chastisement |
| the door reserved for those whose entry to Paradise will be without preliminary judgment | Bāb al-Dhikr: For those who showed zeal in remembering Allah |
| Source: Soubhi El-Saleh, based on numerous traditions | Sources: Doors of Jannah Islam KaZir |

==== Gates/doors ====
Two verses of the Quran (Qu'ran 7:40, 39:73) mention "gates" or "doors" (using the plural form) as the entrance of paradise, but say nothing about their number, names or any other characteristics. As in the case of the levels of Jannah, later sources elaborate, giving names and functions but don't agree on all details (see table to right). (Note: See Soubhi El-Saleh (La Vie Future, chapter 1, pt. 3), who cites numerous traditions describing the gates and gives their categorizes (see table to right). Al-Samarqandi (Macdonald, "Paradise." Islamic Studies, 5 (1966), p. 343) gives a similar classification, although the order and some of the particulars differ; cf. Kitāb aḥwāl al-qiyāma, pp. 105–106, which presents the same description.)

In traditions, each level of the eight principal gates of Paradise is described as generally being divided into a hundred degrees guarded by angels (in some traditions Ridwan). The highest level is known as firdaws (sometimes called Eden) or Illiyin. Entrants will be greeted by angels with salutations of peace or As-Salamu Alaykum.

Jannah is accessible vertically through its gates (Qu'ran 7:40), by ladders (ma'arij) (Qu'ran 70:3), or sky-ropes (asbab). However, only select beings such as angels and prophets can enter. Iblis (Satan) and devils are kept at bay by angels who throw stars at them, whenever they try to climb back to heaven (Q.37:6–10). Notably and contrary to many Christian ideas on heaven, God (Allah) does not reside in paradise. (Note: "...Muslim literature on the otherworld often stresses that God does not reside in Paradise, but above it.")

==== Rivers ====
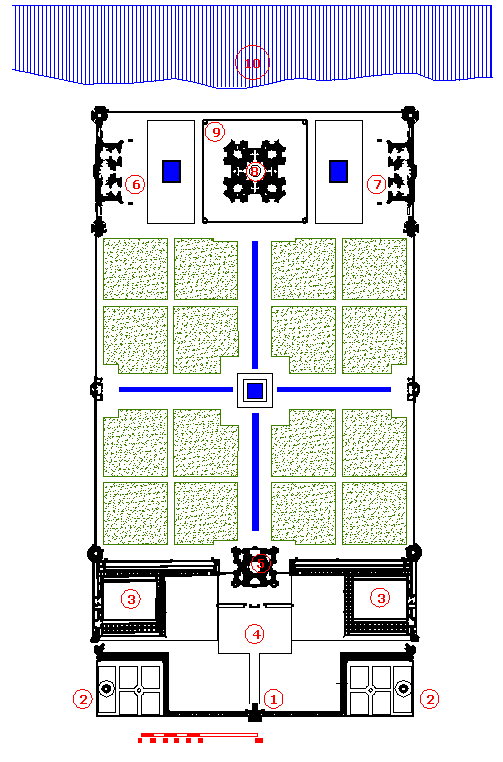
The Jannah is one of the inspirations for Islamic gardens. The Persian paradise garden evolved to the chahārbāgh (Persian for "four gardens"). It appears in palaces and also in monumental tombs, where it reminds of the promised afterlife. The depicted plan is of the Taj Mahal mausoleum.

A few hadith name four rivers in paradise, or coming from paradise, as: Saihan (Syr Darya), Jaihan (Amu Darya), Furat (Euphrates) and Nil (Nile). (Note: According to the website Questions on Islam, "The number of the rivers coming from Paradise is mentioned as three in some narrations and four and five in others.": Three rivers:"For instance, while explaining the sentence “For among rocks there are some from which rivers gush forth” in verse 74 of the chapter of al-Baqara in his book called Sözler (Words), Badiuzzaman Said Nursi attracts attention to the rivers like the Nile, Tigris and Euphrates and quotes the hadith 'The source of each of those three rivers is in Paradise.'"; Four rivers: "In most of the hadith books including Muslim, four rivers that come from Paradise are mentioned."; For those who think that geography and hydrology have proven that the source of the rivers is in mountains and that its water comes from snow melt and rain, a Badiuzzaman Said Nursi explains that this is untrue: “It is certainly not possible that the mountains could be the actual source of such mighty rivers. For let us suppose the water was cut completely and the mountains each became a conical reservoir, they would only persist a few months before losing the balance to the swift and abundant flow of those large rivers. And the rain, which penetrates only about a meter into the earth, would not be sufficient income for that high expenditure. This means that the springs of these rivers are not something ordinary and natural arising from chance, but that the All-Glorious Creator makes them flow forth from an unseen treasury in truly marvelous fashion. Thus, alluding to this mystery and stating this meaning, it is narrated in a Hadith: 'Each of those three rivers is a drop from Paradise which continuously issues forth from Paradise, as a result of which they are sources of abundance.'”) Salsabil is the name of a spring that is the source of the rivers of Rahma (mercy) and Al-Kawthar (abundance). Sidrat al-Muntaha is a Lote tree that marks the end of the seventh heaven, the boundary where no angel or human can pass. Muhammad is supposed to have taken a pomegranate from jannah, and shared it with Ali, as recorded by Nasir al-Din al-Tusi. However, some scholars, like Ghazali, reject that Muhammad took the fruit, argued he had only a vision instead.

=== Literal or allegorical ===
According to scholars Jane I. Smith, Yvonne Y. Haddad, while there are Muslims of a "philosophical or mystical" bent who interpret descriptions of heaven "metaphorically", "the vast majority of believers", understand verses of the Quran on Jannah "to be real and specific, anticipating them" with joy, although this view "has generally not insisted that the realities of the next world will be identical with those of this world". Besides the material notion of the paradise, descriptions of it are also interpreted as allegories, whose meaning is the state of joy believers will experience in the afterlife. For some theologians, seeing God is not a question of sight, but of awareness of God's presence. Although early Sufis, such as Hallaj, took the descriptions of Paradise literally, later Sufi traditions usually stressed the allegorical meaning.

=== Eternal, not temporal ===
Eternality is assured in verses about paradise such as Qu'ran 3:198, 4:57, and 57:12, which say that the righteous will be khālidūn fīhā (eternally in it), and Qu'ran 35:35, which describes the reward of dār al-maqāma [the abode of everlastingness]. Consequently, neither "theologians nor the traditionalists" have had any doubts about the eternal nature of paradise or the residence of the righteous in it.

=== Other characteristics ===
To classical scholars on the afterlife al-Suyūṭī and al-Majlisī, one of the characteristics of Jannah is that events are not "frozen in one eternal moment", but form cycles of "endless repetition" and "unceasing self renewing clockwork". For example, when a fruit is plucked from a tree, a new fruit immediately appears to takes its place; when a hungry inhabitant sees a bird whose meat they would like to eat, it falls already roasted into their hands, and after they are done eating, the bird "regains its form shape and flies away"; houri regain their virginity after being deflowered by one of the saved, but they also grow like fruit on trees or plants on the land and "whenever one of them is taken" by one of the saved in paradise one for his pleasure, "a new one springs forth in her place".

== Garden of Eden and Paradise ==
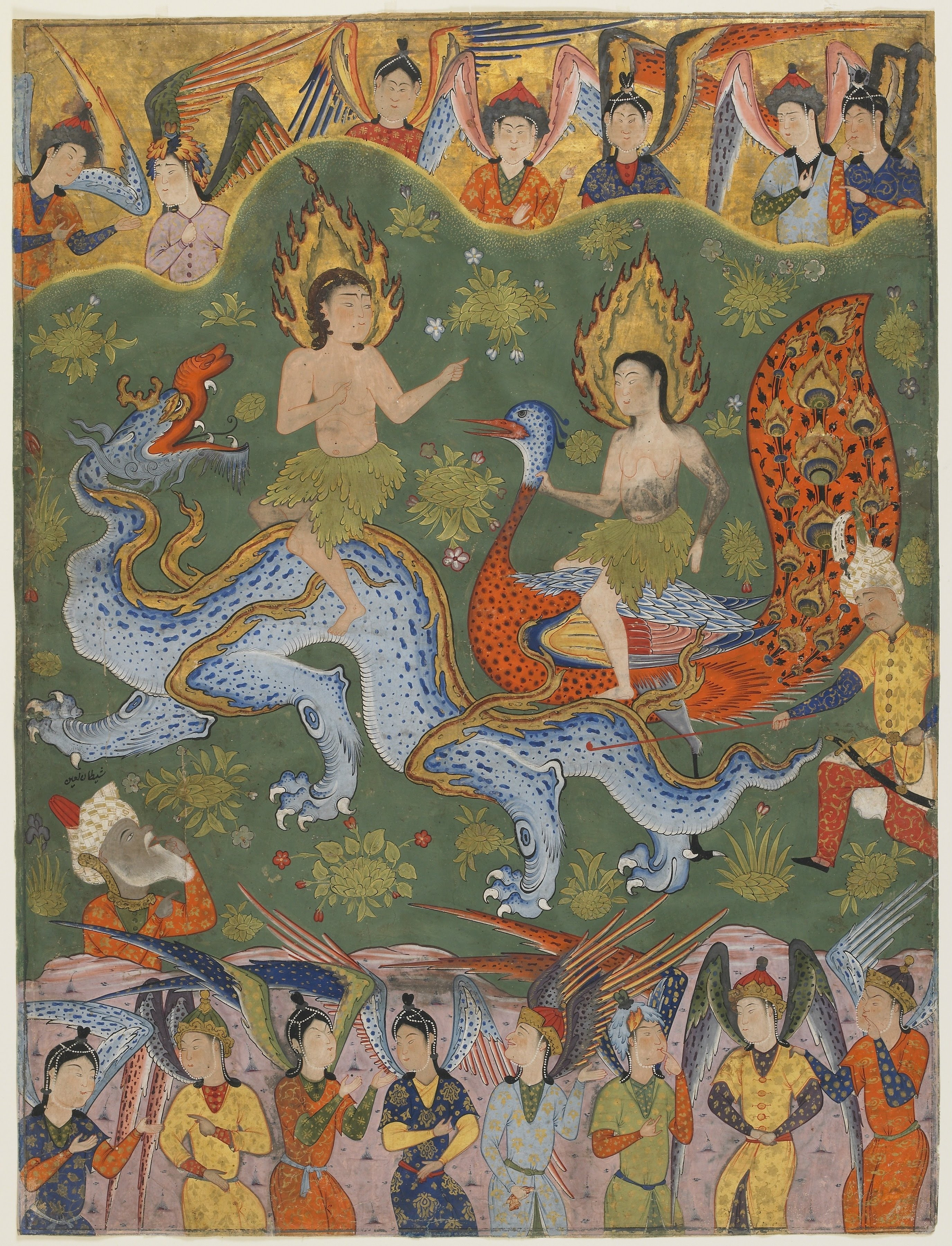
Adam and Eve, cast out from the Garden, along them the serpent and the peacock, who gave aid to Satan. Painting from a copy of the Fālnāmeh (Book of Omens) ascribed to Ja´far al-Sādiq.

Muslim scholars differ on whether the Garden of Eden (jannāt ʿadni), in which Adam and Eve (Adam and Hawwa) dwelled before being expelled by God, is the same as the afterlife abode of the righteous believers: paradise. Most scholars in the early centuries of Islamic theology and the centuries onwards thought it was and that indicated that paradise was located on earth. It was argued that when God commanded Adam to "go down" (ihbit) from the garden, that did not indicate a vertical movement (such as "falling" from a heaven above to earth), but instead was used in the same sense as Moses telling Israelites to "go down to Egypt".

However, as paradise came over the centuries to be thought of more and more as "a transcendent, otherworldy realm", the idea of it being located somewhere on earth fell out of favor. The Garden of Eden, on the other hand lacked many transcendent, otherworldy characteristics. Al-Balluti (887–966) reasoned that the Garden of Eden lacked the perfection and eternal character of a final paradise: Adam and Eve lost the primordial paradise, while the paradisical afterlife lasts forever; if Adam and Eve were in the otherworldly paradise, the devil (Shaiṭān) could not have entered and deceive them since there is no evil or idle talk in paradise; Adam slept in his garden, but there is no sleep in paradise.

Many adherences of the Muʿtazila, also refused to identify Adam's abode with paradise, because they argued that paradise would not be created until after Day of Judgement, an idea proposed by Dirar b. Amr. Most Muslim scholars, however, assert that paradise has been created already and coexists with the contemporary world, taking evidence from the Quran, Muhammad's heavenly journey, and the life in the graves.

Islamic exegesis regards Adam and Eve's expulsion from paradise not as punishment for disobedience or a result from abused free will on their part, but as part of Allah's wisdom (ḥikma) and plan for humanity to experience the full range of his attributes, his love, forgiveness, and his creation's power. By experiencing hardship, they better appreciate paradise and its delights. Khwaja Abdullah Ansari (1006–1088) describes Adam and Eve's expulsion as ultimately caused by God, since man has no choice but to comply to God's will. However, that does not mean that complying is not a "sin" and that humans should not blame themselves for it. That is exemplified by Adam and Eve in the Quran (Qu'ran 7:23 "Our Lord! We have wronged ourselves. If You do not forgive us and have mercy on us, we will certainly be losers".)

== See also ==
- Elysium
- Rawdah ash-Sharifah
