= Asiya =

Pharaoh's wife according to Islam

Asiya bint Muzahim
- آسِيَة
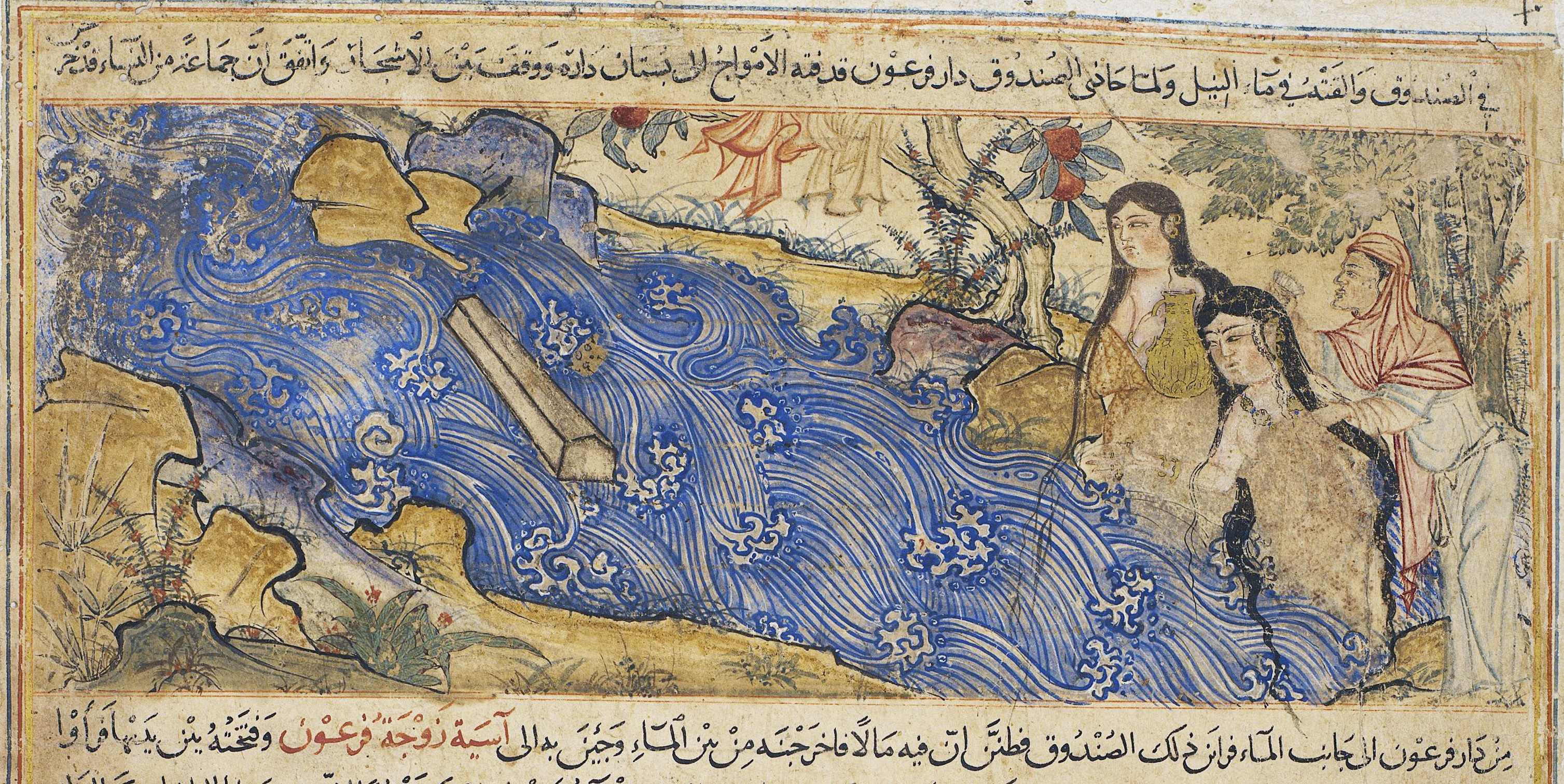
- Asiya (depicted with long black tresses) and her servants, having finished bathing, finds baby Moses in the Nile, Jami' al-tawarikh, c. 1310

Personal life
- Spouse: Pharaoh
- Children: Mūsā (Adopted)
- Parent: Muzāḥim (father)
- Known for: Wife of the Pharaoh; Among the four best of women from the people of Paradise

Asiya bint Muzahim (Arabic: آسِيَة بِنْت مُزَاحِم, romanized: Āsiya bint Muzāḥim) was, according to the Qur'an and Islamic tradition, the wife of the Pharaoh of the Exodus and adoptive mother of Moses.

Asiya is first mentioned in Surah Al-Qasas in the Quran, identified as Bithiah in the Jewish tradition. She is considered by Muslims as one of the four greatest women of all time, and according to Muhammad's narration in Sahih al-Bukhari, the second greatest ever after Mary.

She is believed to have secretly accepted monotheism after witnessing the miracle of Moses. The tradition holds that Asiya worshipped God in secret and hid her religion from her husband. However, later her faith was revealed and the Pharaoh ordered her execution.

Al-Tha'labi believed that the continent of Asia was named after her.

== Narrative ==
And Allah sets forth an example for the believers: the wife of Pharaoh, who prayed, “My Lord! Build me a house in Paradise near You, deliver me from Pharaoh and his ˹evil˺ doing, and save me from the wrongdoing people.”

— Quran 66:11

In Sahih Bukhari, Muhammad said "Many men were completed [in faith], and only Asiya, the wife of Pharaoh, and Maryam bint Imran were completed among the women".

Asiya's marriage to the Pharaoh was arranged. Unlike her husband, she was humble and accepted the faith that Moses and Aaron were preaching. Although she had exceeding wealth, she was not arrogant like the Pharaoh. She realized that faith was far more important and was thus exalted by God amongst the women of her generation, and of all time. According to a few hadiths, Muhammad will marry Asiya in Paradise. (Note: The narration states that Muhammad mentioned: "Allaah married me to Maryam, mother of Jesus, and Kulthum [Miriam], sister of Moses, and Asiyah, the wife of Pharaoh, in Jannah. Al-Hakim al-Nishapuri classified the hadith to be authentic, while Ibn Kathir as weak.)

Maurice Bucaille commented that the wife of Pharaoh who contended with Moses is the one in Surah At-Tahrim, while another early wife of another Pharaoh is the one who adopted him in Surah Al-Qasas. However, as there are no mentions of there being different wives or Pharaohs, the majority of Muslims and scholars believe Asiya and Pharaoh to be a singular person.

Asiya and her maids found a crate floating in the Nile river. Asiya ordered that the crate be drawn ashore. The maids thought there was a treasure inside, but instead found a baby boy, Moses. Unable to conceive herself, Asiya instantly felt a motherly love towards him. She told the Pharaoh about the baby. The incident has been described in the Qur'an:

And Pharaoh's wife said: A refreshment of the eye to me and to thee – slay him not; maybe he will be useful to us, or we may take him for a son. And they perceived not.

— Quran, Surat Al-Qasas, verse 9

According to Islamic belief, Asiya searched for a wet nurse for the baby Moses, but he rejected every woman who attempted to breastfeed him. Moses' sister, who had been ordered by their mother to watch him from afar, approached Asiya and suggested her mother, although concealing their relationship and guising her as any other wet nurse. Miraculously, Moses began to breastfeed from his biological mother and the two were reconnected. Asiya offered her to live in their household and paid her for her services, unaware of their true relationship.

When she witnessed the death of a believing woman under her husband's torture, Asiya declared her faith before the Pharaoh. He tried to turn her away from Islam, but Asiya refused to reject God and the teachings of Moses. On Pharaoh's orders, she was tortured to death.

== Veneration ==
Asiya is one of the four most respected women of all time, and is highly honored by Muslims. It is said that Asiya was a sincere believer and that she fully submitted herself to God, despite being the wife of Pharaoh. According to Hadith, she will be among the first women to enter Paradise because she accepted Moses's monotheism over Pharaoh's beliefs. The Qur'an mentions Asiya as an example to all Muslims. Her supplication is mentioned in the Qur'an:

And Allah citeth an example for those who believe: the wife of Pharaoh when she said: "My Lord! Build for me a home with thee in the Garden, and deliver me from Pharaoh and his work, and deliver me from evil-doing folk."

— Quran: Sura At-Tahrim, verse 11

Abu Musa Ashaari narrated that once Muhammad stated:

There are many persons amongst men who are quite perfect but there are none perfect amongst women except Mary, daughter of Imran, Asiya wife of Pharaoh, and the excellence of Aisha as compared to women is that of Tharid over all other foods.

— Sahih Muslim Hadith 2431

== See also ==
- Tuya (queen)
- Fatimah az-Zahra
- Khadija bint Khuwaylid
- Pharaoh's daughter (Exodus)
