= Houri =

Beautiful woman in Paradise in Islamic belief

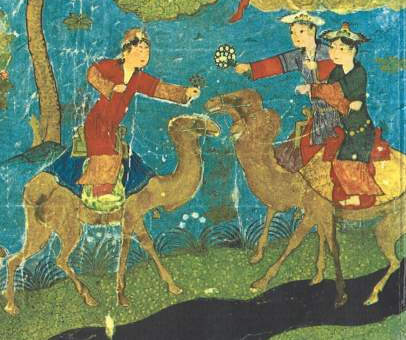
Houris in paradise, riding camels. From a 15th-century Persian manuscript.

In Islam, a houri (/ˈhʊəri, ˈhaʊəri/; Arabic: حُـورِيَّـة ,حُورِيّ, حَورَاء, romanized: ḥūriyy, ḥūrīya, hawraa', lit. 'Companion'), (Note: حورية is also transliterated as ḥūriyyah or ḥūriyya, Arabic: [ħuːˈrijja]. adjectival and feminine singular formation from حُـور, plural of masculine singular aḥwar أحور and feminine singular ḥawrā' حوراء the complete name, ḥur ʿayn Arabic: حور عين "literally means having eyes with marked contrast of black and white") or houris or hoor ayn in plural form, is a heavenly being with beautiful eyes who lives alongside the Muslim faithful in paradise.

The term "houris" is used four times in the Quran, although the houris are mentioned indirectly several other times, (sometimes as azwāj, lit. companions), and hadith provide a "great deal of later elaboration". Muslim scholars differ as to whether they refer to the believing being of this world or a separate creation, with the majority opting for the latter.

Houris have been said to have "captured the imagination of Muslims and non-Muslims alike". According to hadith, faithful being of the Dunya will be superior to houris in paradise. Despite obvious parallels, houris are not perfectly analogous to Western Angels, as those are named separately in Quranic texts.

== Etymology ==
In classical Arabic usage, the word ḥūr (Arabic: حُور) is the plural of both ʾaḥwar (Arabic: أحْوَر) (masculine) and ḥawrāʾ (Arabic: حَوْراء) (feminine) which can be translated as "having eyes with an intense contrast of white and black".

The word "houri" entered several European languages in the 17th and 18th centuries.

Arthur Jeffery and other scholars suggest an Iranian origin for the term, proposing the origins of the word to be the Middle Persian hū̆rust 'well grown'.

== Descriptions in scripture and commentaries ==
The houris are mentioned in several passages of the Quran, always in plural form, but only mentioned directly four times. No specific number is ever given in the Quran for the number of houris accompanying each believer.

=== Quranic description ===
In the Quran, Houris are described as:

- 37:48 "maidens of modest gaze and gorgeous eyes"
- 38:52 "(of) modest gaze and equal age."
- 44:54 "maidens with gorgeous eyes",
- 52:20 "beautiful houris of wide and beautiful eyes",
- 55:56 "untouched beforehand by man or jinn",
- 55:58 "as elegant as rubies and coral",
- 55:72 "bright-eyed damsels sheltered in pavilions",
- 55:74 "untouched by any man", "reclining on green cushions and beautiful carpets",
- 56:8 "the people of the right, how ˹blessed˺ will they be" 56:22 and they will have "houris, maidens with intensely black eyes set against the whiteness of their irises",
- 56:35 "created without the process of birth",
- 78:31–33 full-bosomed maidens of equal age,"
- 44:54 "Thus. And We will marry them to fair women with large, [beautiful] eyes".

It is thought that the four verses specifically mentioning Houri were all "probably" 'revealed' at "the end of the first Meccan period".

=== Hadith description ===
Details of descriptions of houri (or ḥūr), in hadith collections differ, but one summary (by Smith & Haddad) states:

they are generally said to be composed of saffron from the feet to the knees, musk from the knees to the breast, amber from the breast to the neck, and camphor from the neck to the head. Working often with multiples of seven, the traditionalists have described them as wearing seventy to 70,000 gowns, through which even the marrow of their bones can be seen because of the fineness of their flesh, reclining on seventy couches of red hyacinth encrusted with rubies and jewels, and the like. The ḥūr do not sleep, do not get pregnant, do not menstruate, spit, or blow their noses, and are never sick.

In hadith, Houris have been described as "transparent to the marrow of their bones", "eternally young", "hairless except the eyebrows and the head", "pure" and "beautiful". Sunni hadith scholars also relate a number of sayings of the Islamic Prophet Muhammad in which the houris are mentioned.

- A narration related by Bukhari states that
  Everyone will have two wives from the houris, (who will be so beautiful, pure and transparent that) the marrow of the bones of their legs will be seen through the bones and the flesh.
- Another, reported by Muslim ibn al-Hajjaj Nishapuri, relates that
  The (members) of the first group to get into Paradise would have their faces as bright as full moon during the night, and the next to this group would have their faces as bright as the shining stars in the sky, and every person would have two wives and the marrow of their shanks would glimmer beneath the flesh and there would be none without a wife in Paradise.
- Al-Tirmidhi reports
  Al-Hasan Al-Basri says that an old woman came to the messenger of God and asked, O Messenger of God make dua that God grants me entrance into Jannah. The Messenger of God replied, "O Mother, an old woman cannot enter Jannah." That woman started crying and began to leave. The Messenger of God said, "Say to the woman that one will not enter in a state of old age, but God will make all the women of Jannah young virgins. God Most High says, 'Lo! We have created them a (new) creation and made them virgins, lovers, equal in age.'"
- According to a report transmitted by Ibn Majah in his Sunan:
  A woman does not annoy her husband but his spouse from amongst the maidens with wide eyes intensely white and deeply black will say: "Do not annoy him, may Allah ruin you. He is with you as a passing guest. Very soon, he will part with you and come to us".

=== Quranic commentators ===
Sunni sources mention that like all men and women of Paradise, the houris do not experience urination, defecation or menstruation.

Ibn Kathir states that jinns will have female jinn companions in Paradise.

==== Contemporary ====
According to Smith and Haddad, if there is any generalization that can be made of "contemporary attitudes" toward the nature of the hereafter, including Houri, it is that it is "beyond human comprehension ... beyond time", that the Quran only "alluded to analogously".

==== Imam Reza ====
According to 8th Shia Imam, Imam Reza, the heavenly spouses are created of dirt (Creation of life from clay) and saffron.

=== Symbolism ===
Muhammad Asad believes that the references to houris and other depictions of paradise should be understood as allegorical rather than literal, citing the "impossibility of man's really 'imagining' paradise". In support of this view he quotes Quran verse 32:17 and a hadith found in Bukhari and Muslim.

Shia philosopher Muhammad Husayn Tabatabai mentions that the most important fact of the description of the houris is that good deeds performed by believers are re-compensated by the houris, who are the physical manifestations of ideal forms that will not fade away over time and who will serve as faithful companions to those whom they accompany.

=== Similarities to Zoroastrianism ===
The houri has been said to resemble afterlife figures in Zoroastrianism narratives:

The Zoroastrian text, Hadhoxt Nask, describes the fate of a soul after death. The soul of the righteous spends three nights near the corpse, and at the end of the third night, the soul sees its own religion (daena) in the form of a beautiful damsel, a lovely fifteen year-old virgin; thanks to good actions she has grown beautiful; they then ascend heaven together. The orientalist Arthur Jeffery argues in his book Foreign 'Vocabulary of the Qur'an' that the two concepts closely correspond to each other. Possibly the word "houri" also has an Iranian origin, but this is heavily debated among scholars. Jeffery believes it might have been borrowed from the Pahlavi word 'hurūst'. Although the word itself might have been borrow by the Arabs from Aramaic, the relation to the 'maidens of paradise' likely came under influence of this Pahlavi word,

== Gender and identity ==
It has traditionally been believed that the houris are beautiful women who are promised as a reward to believing men, with numerous hadith and Quranic exegetes describing them as such. In recent years, however, some have argued that the term ḥūr refers both to pure men and pure women (it being the plural term for both the masculine and feminine forms which refer to whiteness) and the belief that the term houris only refers to females who are in paradise is a misconception.

The Quran uses feminine as well as gender-neutral adjectives to describe houris, by describing them with the indefinite adjective عِينٌ, which some have taken to imply that certain passages are referring to both male and female companions. In addition, the use of masculine pronouns for the houris' companions does not imply that this companionship is restricted to men, as the masculine form encompasses the female in classical and Quranic Arabic—thus functioning as an all-gender including default form—and is used in the Quran to address all humanity and all the believers in general. (Note: In these verses, God addresses the believers, male and female alike, and orders them to speak وَقُولُوا (masculine form) and listen وَاسْمَعُوا (masculine form), using the grammatical masculine form although the addressed group includes females.)

In The Message of The Qur'an, Muhammad Asad describes the usage of the term ḥūr in the verses 44:54 and 56:22, arguing that "the noun ḥūr—rendered by me as 'companions pure'—is a plural of both aḥwār (masc.) and ḥawrā (fem.)... hence, the compound expression ḥūr ʿīn signifies, approximately, 'pure beings, most beautiful of eye'."

Annemarie Schimmel says that the Quranic description of the houris should be viewed in a context of love: "every pious man who lives according to God's order will enter Paradise where rivers of milk and honey flow in cool, fragrant gardens and virgin beloveds await home".

=== Relation to earthly women ===
Regarding the eschatological status of this-worldly women vis-à-vis the houris, scholars have maintained that righteous human women of this life are of a higher station than houris. Sunni theologian Aḥmad al-Ṣāwī (d. 1825), in his commentary on Ahmad al-Dardir's work, states, "The sound position is that the women of this world will be seventy thousand times better than the dark-eyed Fair Ones (ḥūr ʿīn)." Muḥammad ibn ʿUmar Baḥraq (d.1524) mentions in his didactic primer for children that "Adamic women are better than the dark-eyed Damsels due to their prayer, fasting, and devotions".

Other authorities appear to indicate that houris themselves are the women of this world resurrected in new form, with Razi commenting that among the houris mentioned in the Quran will also be "[even] those toothless old women of yours whom God will resurrect as new beings". Muhammad ibn Jarir al-Tabari mentions that all righteous women, however old and decayed they may have been on earth, will be resurrected as virginal maidens and will, like their male counterparts, remain eternally young in paradise. Modernist scholar Muḥammad ʿAbduh states "the women of the Garden are the good believers [al-mu'mināt al-ṣalihāt] known in the Qur'an as al-ḥūr al-ʿayn, (although he also makes a distinction between earthly women and houri).

Verses that are thought to refer to women from earth in paradise (Q.2:25, 3:15, and 4:57) talk of "purified companions" [azwāj muṭahhara], which distinguishes them from ḥūr, who are by definition "pure rather than purified".

== Disputed sexualised descriptions ==
=== Sexual intercourse in Paradise ===
In the Quran, there is no overt mention of sexual intercourse in Paradise. However, it is alluded to in hadiths, tafsirs and Islamic commentaries.

=== Reference to "72 virgins" ===
The Sunni hadith scholar Al-Tirmidhi quotes Muhammad as having said:

The smallest reward for the people of Heaven is an abode where there are eighty thousand servants and seventy-two houri, over which stands a dome decorated with pearls, aquamarine, and ruby, as wide as the distance from al-Jabiyyah to Sanaa.

However, others object that the narration granting all men seventy-two wives has a weak chain of narrators.

Another hadith, also in Jamiʽ at-Tirmidhi and deemed "good and sound" (hasan sahih) gives this reward specifically for the martyr:

There are six things with Allah for the martyr. He is forgiven with the first flow of blood (he suffers), he is shown his place in Paradise, he is protected from punishment in the grave, secured from the greatest terror, the crown of dignity is placed upon his head—and its gems are better than the world and what is in it—he is married to seventy-two wives among the wide-eyed houris (Ar. اثْنَتَيْنِ وَسَبْعِينَ زَوْجَةً مِنَ الْحُورِ الْعِينِ) of Paradise, and he may intercede for seventy of his close relatives.

This hadith is sometimes erroneously attributed to the Quran.

=== Outsider translations of the Qur'an ===
==== N. J. Dawood ====
The translation of the "Koran" (Qur'an) by N. J. Dawood, published as a Penguin paperback, describes houris as "chaste" and "virgins". Dawood was a native speaker of Arabic but not a Muslim or a religious scholar. His expertise was poetry and his translation treated the text as a work of artistic literature. His 1956 edition re-ordered the Surahs to match the Bible, to make it easier for Western readers to understand. Ziauddin Sardar, criticized Dawood' translation as containing "distortions that give the Qur'an violent and sexist overtones", in an article published by The Guardian comparing to a modern translation by Tarif Khalidi. Sardar described the very popular Dawood translation as "largely responsible for the current misconception that Muslim paradise is full of "virgins" - despite the fact that the Qur'an explicitly denies any carnal pleasures in paradise". Dawood's knowledge of the Arabic language is extensive and respected, and he also translated government documents, but him not being Muslim has made his translation controversial. Many Muslims believe that fully capturing the meaning of the Quran in any other language is impossible and it should only be attempted by a Muslim who understands the religion.

==== Marmaduke Pickthall ====
Houris are also described as virgins in the translation by Marmaduke Pickthall.

==== Christoph Luxenberg's Syriac raisins ====
Christoph Luxenberg, in his German language book "The Syro-Aramaic Reading of the Koran" (German: Die Syro-Aramaische Lesart des Koran), claimed that the word for Houris meant white raisins, based on its machining in Syriac Aramaic.

=== Fully grown adults ===
The virgins of paradise "they will be of one age, thirty-three years old", according to Ibn Kathir (as reported by Ad-Dahhak aka Ibn Abi Asim), based on his interpretation of the word Atrab (Arabic: أَتْرَابًا) in Q.56:37).

However, another interpretation of Atrab (in Q.56:37 and also Q.78:33) by Muhammad Haleen describes Houri "as being of similar age to their companions". An Islamic Books pamphlet also states Houri will "have the same age as their husbands so that they can relate to each other better", but also adds that they will "never become old"; (Translations of Q.56:37 and Q.78:33—for example by Mustafa Khattab's the Clear Quran and by Pickthall—often include the phrase "equal age" but do not specify what the houris are of equal age to.)

On the other hand, the houris were created "without the process of birth", according to a classical Sunni interpretation of Q.56:35 in Tafsir al-Jalalayn, (Note: "Indeed, We will have perfectly created their mates" (Q.56:35); can be interpreted as "Verily We have created them with an unmediated creation namely the wide-eyed houris We created them without the process of birth", according to a classical Sunni interpretation of the Quran, Tafsir al-Jalalayn, (translated by Feras Hamza)) so that the heavenly virgins have no birthday or age in the earthly sense.

Other sources, including a tafsir of Ibn Kathir (see above), emphasize the purpose of the use of kawa'ib in verse Q.78:33 "is to highlight the woman's youthfulness", though she is an adult, she "has reached the age when she begins to menstruate"; and that she is of the age of "young girls when their breasts are beginning to appear". At least one person (M Faroof Malik) translates Arabic: قَـٰصِرَٰتُ ٱلطَّرْفِ in verse Q.55:56 as "bashful virgins".

==== Meaning of the term kawa'ib ====
Verse Q.78:33 describes Houri with the noun ka'ib, translated as "with swelling breasts" by several translators—like Arberry, Palmer, Rodwell and Sale (it is also translated as "buxom" or "full bosomed"). At least two Islamic Fatwa sites (islamweb.net and islamqa.info) have attacked the use of these translations by those who "criticize the Quran", or who "seek to make Islam appear to be a religion of sex and desire".

Ibn Kathir, in his tafsir, writes that kawa'ib has been interpreted to refer to "fully developed" or "round breasts ... they meant by this that the breasts of these girls will be fully rounded and not sagging, because they will be virgins." Similarly, the authoritative Arabic–English Lexicon of Edward William Lane defines the word ka'ib as "A girl whose breasts are beginning to swell, or become prominent, or protuberant or having swelling, prominent, or protuberant, breasts". (Note: islamweb.net states: "{Kawaa'ib} means round-breasted"; and islamqa.info translates Q.78:33 as "And young full-breasted (mature) maidens of equal age")

However, M. A. S. Abdel Haleem and others point out that the description here refers in classical usage to the young age rather than emphasizing the women's physical features. Others, such as Abdullah Yusuf Ali, translate ka'ib as "companions", with Muhammad Asad interpreting the term as being allegorical.

== See also ==
- Islamophobic trope § 72 virgins
- Apsara – Type of female spirit of the clouds and waters in Hindu and Buddhist culture
- Garden of Eden – Biblical garden of God
- Jannah – Islamic concept of Paradise
- Maid of Heaven – Dungeon in Tehran, Iran (Bahá'í faith)
- Peri – Fairy-like spirit in West and Central Asian folklore of Persian origin
- Women in Islam
