= At-Tahrim =

66th chapter of the Qur'an

Surah 66 of the Quran
التحريم At-Taḥrīm The Banning
- Qira'ah; English text
- Classification: Medinan
- Other names: The Prohibition, The Forbidding
- Position: Juzʼ 28
- No. of verses: 12
- No. of Rukus: 2

At-Taḥrīm (Arabic: التحريم, 'Banning, Prohibition') is the 66th Surah or chapter of the Quran and contains 12 verses (ayah). This Surah deals with questions regarding Muhammad's wives.

The Surah's name is derived from the words lima tuharrimu of the first verse. This is not a title of its subject matter, but the name implies that it is the Surah in which the incident of tahrim (prohibition, forbiddance) has been mentioned.

== Summary ==
- 1 Muhammad reproved for making a vow to please his wives
- 2 He is relieved from his vow
- 3-5 Muhammad's wives (Aisha & Hafsa) admonished for their jealousy in the affair of Zaynab bint Jahsh, Muhammad's another wife.
- 6-8 Exhortation to believers to exercise faith, repentance etc.
- 9 Muhammad commanded to treat infidels and hypocrites with severity
- 10-12 The wives of Noah, Lot, Pharaoh, and the daughter of Imran examples to Muslim women

== Probable date of revelation ==
In connection with the incident of Tahrim referred to in this Surah, the traditions of the Hadith mentions the affair regarding the three ladies who were among the wives of Muhammad at that time; Safiyya bint Huyayy, Zainab Bint Jahsh and Maria al-Qibtiyya. The former (i. e. Safiyyah) was taken to wife by Muhammad after the conquest of Khaiber, and Khaiber was conquered, as has been unanimously reported, in A. H. 7. The other lady, Mariyah, had been presented to Muhammad by Al-Muqawqis, the ruler of Egypt, in A. H. 7, whom Muhammed had known to freed and married her according to Ibn Kathir and had borne him his son, Ibrahim ibn Muhammad, in Dhu al-Hijjah, A. H. 8. Another Hadith tradition mentions about the honey incident which have been known to take place in A. H. 8. These historical events almost precisely determine that this Surah was sent down some time during A. H. 7 or A. H .8.

== Asbab al-nuzul ==
Asbāb al-nuzūl, an Arabic term meaning "occasions/circumstances of revelation", is a secondary genre of Qur'anic exegesis (tafsir) directed at establishing the context in which specific verses of the Qur'an were revealed. Though of some use in reconstructing the Qur'an's historicity, asbāb is by nature an exegetical rather than a historiographical genre, and as such usually associates the verses it explicates with general situations rather than specific events. According to Sale, the occasion of this chapter was as follows: "There are some who suppose this passage to have been occasioned by Muhammad’s protesting never to eat honey any more, because, having once eaten some in the apartment of Hafsa bint Umar or of Zaynab bint Jahsh, three other of his wives, namely, Aisha, Sawda bint Zamʿa, and Safiyya bint Huyayy, all told him they smelt he had been eating of the juice which distils from certain shrubs in those parts, and resembles honey in taste and consistency, but is of a very strong savour, and which the Prophet had a great aversion to." Muhammad al-Bukhari recorded that Aisha narrated:

The Prophet (ﷺ) used to stay (for a period) in the house of Zaynab bint Jahsh (one of the wives of the Prophet ) and he used to drink honey in her house. Hafsa bint Umar and I decided that when the Prophet (ﷺ) entered upon either of us, she would say, "I smell in you the bad smell of Maghafir (a bad smelling raisin). Have you eaten Maghafir?" When he entered upon one of us, she said that to him. He replied (to her), "No, but I have drunk honey in the house of Zaynab bint Jahsh, and I will never drink it again." Then the following verse was revealed: 'O Prophet ! Why do you ban (for you) that which Allah has made lawful for you?. ..(up to) If you two (wives of the Prophet (ﷺ) turn in repentance to Allah.' (66.1-4) The two were `Aisha and Hafsa And also the Statement of Allah: 'And (Remember) when the Prophet (ﷺ) disclosed a matter in confidence to one of his wives!' (66.3) i.e., his saying, "But I have drunk honey."...

== Hadith ==
- Sa'id ibn Jubayr narrated that Ibn 'Abbas said: "A man came to him and said: 'I have made my wife forbidden to myself.' He said: 'You are lying, she is not forbidden to you.' Then he recited this Verse: 'O Prophet! Why do you forbid (for yourself) that which Allah has allowed to you.'(At-Tahrim) (And he said): 'You have to offer the severest form of expiation: Freeing a slave.'"
- 'Ubaid bin 'Umair narrated from 'Aishah, the wife of the Prophet: "The Prophet used to stay with Zainab bint Jahsh and drink honey at her house. Hafsah and I agreed that if the Prophet came to either of us, she would say: 'I detect the smell of Maghafir (a nasty-smelling gum) on you; have you eaten Maghafir?' He came to one of them and she said that to him. Then the following was revealed: 'O Prophet! Why do you forbid (for yourself) that which Allah has allowed to you.' 'If you two turn in repentance to Allah, (it will be better for you).' Addressing 'Aishah and Hafsah; 'And (remember) when the Prophet disclosed a matter in confidence to one of his wives.' refers to him saying: "No, rather I drank honey." Another authentic hadith mentioned in Sunan an-Nasa'i.Sunan an-Nasa'i 3421 — Amrayn
- Narrated `Aisha: Allah's Messenger used to love sweet edible things and honey.Hadith 5431 of the book of foods (meals) by sahih al bukhari

== Placement and coherence with other surahs ==
The idea of textual relation between the verses of a chapter has been discussed under various titles such as nazm and munasabah in non-English literature and coherence, text relations, intertextuality, and unity in English literature. Hamiduddin Farahi, an Islamic scholar of the Indian subcontinent, is known for his work on the concept of nazm, or coherence, in the Quran. Fakhruddin al-Razi (died 1209 CE), Zarkashi (died 1392) and several other classical as well as contemporary Quranic scholars have contributed to the studies.

This surah is the last surah of 6th group of surahs which starts from surah Qaf (50) and runs till At-Tahrim(66) and the recurring theme of this section of Quran is Arguments on afterlife and the requirements of faith in it. With regards to the subject-matter, this surah forms a pair with the previous one (At-Talaq). Tadabbur-i-Quran is a tafsir (exegeses) of the Qur'an by Amin Ahsan Islahi based on the concept of thematic and structural coherence, which was originally inspired by Allama Hamiduddin Farahi. The tafsir is extended over nine volumes of six thousand pages. It describes At-Tahrim as a supplement to the previous surah with respect to the central theme. According to Javed Ahmad Ghamidi

Surah al-Talaq (65) and Surah al-Tahrim (66) both these surahs form a pair with regard to their subject-matter. In the first surah, the limits which should be observed by a believer while parting from wives are explained while in the second surah, the limits he should observe at instances of expressing love to them are described. Both surahs are addressed to the Muslims, and it is evident from their subject-matter that they were revealed in Madinah in the tazkiyah wa tathir phase of Muhammad’s preaching mission.
