= Sebastian Günther =

German academic

Sebastian Günther is a German scholar specializing in Arabic and Islamic Studies.

== Biography ==
He pursued Arabic and Islamic studies at Martin Luther University, Halle-Wittenberg, Germany (1981-1986), where he earned his M.A. in 1986 and his Ph.D. in 1989.

After receiving his doctorate, Sebastian Günther began his academic career at Martin Luther University, engaging in research and teaching at the Institute of Oriental Studies. During his early career, he visited several institutions of higher learning in the Middle East, including al-Azhar University in Cairo, the National UAE University in Al-Ain, the German Orient Institute in Beirut, and the American University of Beirut.

From 1998 to 2008, Günther was a faculty member of the University of Toronto's Department of Near and Middle Eastern Civilizations as an Assistant and Associate Professor. Since 2008, Sebastian Günther has been a University Professor and Chair of Arabic and Islamic Studies at Georg August University, Göttingen.

== Achievements ==
Günther has received several academic recognitions throughout his career, including an Award for Outstanding Academic Contributions from the President of the International Islamic University in Islamabad, Pakistan, and in 2018, a Certificate and Medal of Appreciation for his work fostering dialogue between East and West, from the Grand Imam of Al-Azhar in Cairo.

He has also been an Associate Member of the Lichtenberg Institute for Advanced Studies in Göttingen (2011- 2012), and was awarded a Willis F. Doney Fellowship at the Institute for Advanced Study in Princeton (2017-2018) and a Hans Robert Roemer Research Fellowship at the German Orient Institute of Beirut in 2022.

From 2010 to 2015, he served as President of the Union Européenne des Arabisants et Islamisants (UEAI).

In April 2025, Sebastian Günther was elected an International Honorary Member of the American Academy of Arts and Sciences, Class IV: Humanities and Arts.

== Publications (selection) ==
Sebastian Günther's research focuses on Islamic thought and Arabic literature. His works often reflect interdisciplinary approaches in history, philosophy, and literature to provide insights into Islam’s intellectual traditions with particular attention to the history of Islamic education.

Some of his publications also deal with the dialogues between the Abrahamic religious traditions, highlighting the interconnections and shared narratives that have shaped religious thought in the Mediterranean across centuries.

=== Books ===
- Building Bridges: Ignaz Goldziher and His Correspondents, Islamic and Jewish Studies around the Turn of the Twentieth Century, ed. by Hans-Jürgen Becker, Kinga Dévényi, Sebastian Günther and Sabine Schmidtke, Brill: Leiden 2024
- Rabbinī wa-ʿallimnī: Dirāsāt fī l-khitāb al-tarbawī wa-l-akhlāqī fī l-Islām (Raise and Educate Me: Studies in the Educational and Ethical Discourses of Islam), Beirut: Dār al-Mashriq 2023, 478 pp. - ISBN 978-2-7214-8181-8.
- Islamic Ethics as Educational Discourse: Thought and Impact of the Classical Muslim Thinker Miskawayh (d. 1030), ed. by Sebastian Günther and Yassir El-Jamouhi, Tübingen: Mohr Siebeck 2021.
- Lesen, Deuten und Verstehen?! Debatten über heilige Texte in Orient und Okzident, hrsg. von Sebastian Günther und Florian Wilk, Tübingen: Mohr Siebeck 2021.
- Knowledge and Education in Classical Islam: Religious Learning between Continuity and Change, 2 vols., Leiden: Brill 2020. – (Islamic History and Civilization 172).
- Doctrinal Instruction in Early Islam: The Book of the Explanation of Sunna by Ghulām Khalīl (d. 275/888). Edition, Translation and Study, by Maher Jarrar, in collaboration with Sebastian Günther, Leiden: Brill 2020. – (Islamic History and Civilization 174).
- Die Geheimnisse der oberen und der unteren Welt: Magie im Islam zwischen Glaube und Wissenschaft, hrsg. von Sebastian Günther and Dorothee Pielow, Leiden: Brill 2018. – (Islamic History and Civilization 158).
- Roads to Paradise: Eschatology and Concepts of the Hereafter in Islam. I. Foundations and the Formation of a Tradition: Reflections on the Hereafter in the Quran and Islamic Religious Thought. II. Continuity and Change: The Plurality of Eschatological Representations in the Islamicate World, ed. by Sebastian Günther and Todd Lawson, with the assistance of Christian Mauder, Leiden: Brill 2016. – (Islamic History and Civilization 136).
- Representations and Visions of Homeland in Modern Arabic Literature, ed. by Sebastian Günther and Stefan Milich, Hildesheim: Olms 2016. – (Arabistische und Islamwissenschaftliche Texte und Studien 20).
- Von Rom nach Bagdad: Bildung und Religion von der römischen Kaiserzeit bis zum klassischen Islam. Tübingen: Mohr Siebeck. 2013. ISBN 978-3-16-151679-5.
- Ideas, Images, and Methods of Portrayal: Insights into Classical Arabic Literature and Islam, ed. by Sebastian Günther, Leiden: Brill 2005. – (Islamic History and Civilization 58).
- Aspects of Literary Hermeneutics in Arabic Culture: Myths, Historical Archetypes and Symbolic Figures in Arabic Literature, ed. by Angelika Neuwirth, Brigit Embaló, Sebastian Günther and Maher Jarrar, Wiesbaden, Beirut: Franz Steiner [et al.] 1999. – (Beiruter Texte und Studien 64).
- Johann W. Fück: Vorträge über den Islam. Aus dem Nachlaß herausgegeben und um einen Anmerkungsteil ergänzt von Sebastian Günther, Halle/Saale: Institute für Orientalistik, Martin-Luther-Univ. Halle-Wittenberg 1999. – (Hallesche Beiträge zur Orientwissenschaft 27).
- Erlesenes. Sonderheft anläßlich des 19. Kongresses der Union Européenne d’Arabisants et Islamisants, ed. by Walter Beltz and Sebastian Günther, Halle (Saale): Universitätsdruckerei, 1998. – (Hallesche Beiträge zur Orientwissenschaft 25).
- Quellenuntersuchungen zu den Maqātil aṭ-Ṭālibiyyīn des Abū ’l-Faraǧ al-Iṣfahānī (gest. 356/967), Hildesheim: Olms 1991. – (Arabistische Texte und Studien 4).
