= Ar-Rahman =

55th chapter of the Qur'an

Surah 55 of the Quran
ٱلرَّحْمَٰنِ Ar-Rahman The Merciful
- Qira'ah; English text
- Classification: Medinan
- Other names: Most Gracious
- Position: Juzʼ 27
- Hizb no.: 54
- No. of verses: 78
- No. of Rukus: 3
- No. of words: 352
- No. of letters: 1585

Ar-Rahman
Recitation of Ar-Rahman in mujawwad.

Ar-Rahman (Arabic: ٱلرَّحْمَٰنِ, romanized: ar-raḥmān; meaning: the Merciful; Most Gracious; Most Merciful) is the 55th Chapter (Surah) of the Qur'an, with 78 verses; (āyāt). The Surah was revealed in Madinan and emphasizes themes of mercy, creation, and the relationship between Allah and humanity, making it a significant chapter in Islamic teachings.

The title of the surah, Ar-Rahman, appears in verse 1 and means "The Most Beneficent". The divine appellation "ar-Rahman" also appears in the opening formula which precedes every surah except Sura 9 ("In the Name of God, the Lord of Mercy, the Giver of Mercy"). English translations of the surah's title include "The Most Gracious", "The All Merciful", "The Lord of Mercy", "The Beneficent", and "The Mercy-Giving". In the fourth century CE south Arabian pagan inscriptions started to be replaced by monotheistic expressions, using the term rahmān.

There is disagreement over whether Ar-Rahman ought to be categorized as a surah of the Meccan or Medinan period. Theodor Nöldeke and Carl Ernst have categorized it among the surahs of the early Meccan period (in accordance with its short ayah length), but Abdel Haleem has categorized it in his translation as Medinan, although most Muslim scholars place Sūrat ar-Rahman in the Meccan period. According to traditional Egyptian chronology, Ar-Rahman was the 97th surah revealed. Nöldeke places it earlier, at 43, while Ernst suggests that it was the fifth surah revealed.

- ۞ 1-4 God taught the Quran to the human.
- 5-16 God the creator of all things.
- 17-25 God controlled the seas and all that is therein
- 26-30 God ever liveth, though all else decay and die
- 31-40 God will certainly judge both men and jinn
- 41-45 God will consign the wicked to hell-fire
- 46-78 The joys of Paradise described
Ar-Rahman 1-15

(55:1) The Most Compassionate... (55:3-4) created humanity, (and) taught them speech. (55:5, 7, 10) The sun and the moon (travel) with precision... As for the sky, He raised it (high), and set the balance (of justice), He laid out the earth for all beings.

(55:16) Then which of your Lord’s favours will you (humans and jinn) both deny?

— Al-Qur'an, Juz 27

== Structure ==
Ar-Rahman is composed entirely in saj’, the rhymed, accent-based prose characteristic of early Arabic poetry.

The most notable structural feature of Ar-Rahman is the refrain "Which, then, of your Lord’s blessings do you both deny?" (or, in Arberry’s rendering, "O which of your Lord's bounties will you and you deny?"), which is repeated 31 times in the 78 verses.

Chapter 55 (Surah Rahman) is composed of 26 couplets, 4 tercets, and an introductory stanza of 13 verses all ending with this refrain. The final couplet is followed by a blessing of God's name.

Thematically, Ar-Rahman can be divided into roughly three units.

- Verses 1-30 expound upon natural displays of Allah's creative power and mercy in showering those who inhabit the earth with blessings.
- Verses 31-45 describe the final judgment and the terrible punishment that will be inflicted upon sinners.
- Verses 46–78, by contrast, detail the delights that await the pious in paradise.

== Ayat (Verses) ==
=== Q55:70-77 Houri ===
55:70-77 Therein (Gardens) will be Khayrat Hisan (good); Then which of the blessings of your Lord will you both deny! Houri (beautiful, fair females) guarded in pavilions; Then which of the blessings of your Lord will you both deny! Whom never deflowered a human before nor Jinn. Then which of the blessings of your Lord will you both deny! Reclining on green Rafraf (cushions) and rich beautiful `Abqariy. (rich carpets). Then which of the blessings of your Lord will you both deny!

Muhammad Asad asserts that the "noun hur – rendered as 'companions pure' – is a plural of both ahwar (masculine) and hawra’ (feminine), each describing a person distinguished by hawar, a term that denotes 'intense whiteness of the eyeballs and lustrous black of the iris.' Asad, along with Yusuf Ali and Marmaduke Pickthall, translates this verse as:

In these [gardens] will be [all] things most excellent and beautiful. Which, then, of your Sustainer's powers can you disavow? [There the blest will live with their] companions pure and modest, in pavillions [splendid] -which, then, of your Sustainer's powers can you disavow? -[companions] whom neither man nor invisible being will have touched ere then. Which, then, of your Sustainer's powers can you disavow?[In such a paradise will they dwell,] reclining upon meadows green and carpets rich in beauty. Which, then, of your Sustainer's powers can you disavow? Hallowed be thy Sustainer's name, full of majesty and glory!

According to Ibn Kathir, the believer will be given a tent 60 miles wide, made of pearl, such that his wives will not see each other. The believer will visit them all. The Enlightening Commentary into the Light of the Holy Qur'an says that they (the Houri) are good and righteous virgins and are intended to have intercourse only with their husbands.

== Hadith ==
Owing to the sura’s poetic beauty, it is often regarded as the 'beauty of the Quran', in accordance with a hadith: Abdullah ibn Mas'ud reported that Muhammad said, "Everything has an adornment, and the adornment of the Qur'an is Surah Ar-Rahman"

Imam Jafar Sadiq says: Whoever recites Surah “Ar-Rahman” and, after each verse, says: "Then which of the favors of your Lord will you deny?" He will say: "My Lord! I do not deny any of Your favors." So if he recites it at night and passes away, he has passed away as a martyr, and if he recites it during the day and passes away, he has also passed away as a martyr.
