= At-Tur =

52nd chapter of the Qur'an

Surah 52 of the Quran
الطور Aṭ-Ṭūr The Mount
- Qira'ah; English text
- Classification: Meccan
- Position: Juzʼ 27
- No. of verses: 49
- No. of Rukus: 2
- No. of words: 312
- No. of letters: 1324

At-Tur (Arabic: الطور, aṭ-ṭūr; meaning: The Mount) is the 52nd chapter (sūrah) of the Quran with 49 verses (ayat). The surah opens with the oath of Allah swearing by the Mount, which some believe is Mount Sinai, where the Tawrat was revealed to Musa. The chapter takes its name from "the mount" (ṭūr) mentioned in verse 1.

The surah addresses many of the arguments put to the Prophet by the disbelievers of Mecca (verse 29 ff.). The bliss that will be enjoyed by the believers is contrasted with the torments of Hell, and the Prophet is urged to bide his time, to continue to deliver his message, and to wait with confidence for God's judgement. God swears by, among other things, Mount Sinai, that the Day of Judgement is inevitable.

== Summary ==
- 1-8 Oaths by various objects that the judgment-day will come
- 9-16 The terrors of the unbelievers in that day
- 17-28 The bliss of Paradise described
- 29-34 Muhammad not a soothsayer, madman, poet, or impostor
- 35-47 Unbelievers reproved for their ignorance and idolatry
- 42-43 Plots of the enemies of Muhammad exposed
- 44-47 Muhammad to leave the idolaters to their fate
- 48-49 Muhammad exhorted to praise and trust the Lord
