= Jesus in Islam =

Penultimate prophet in Islam

Prophet ʿĪsā Alayhi as-Salam
- عيسى; Jesus
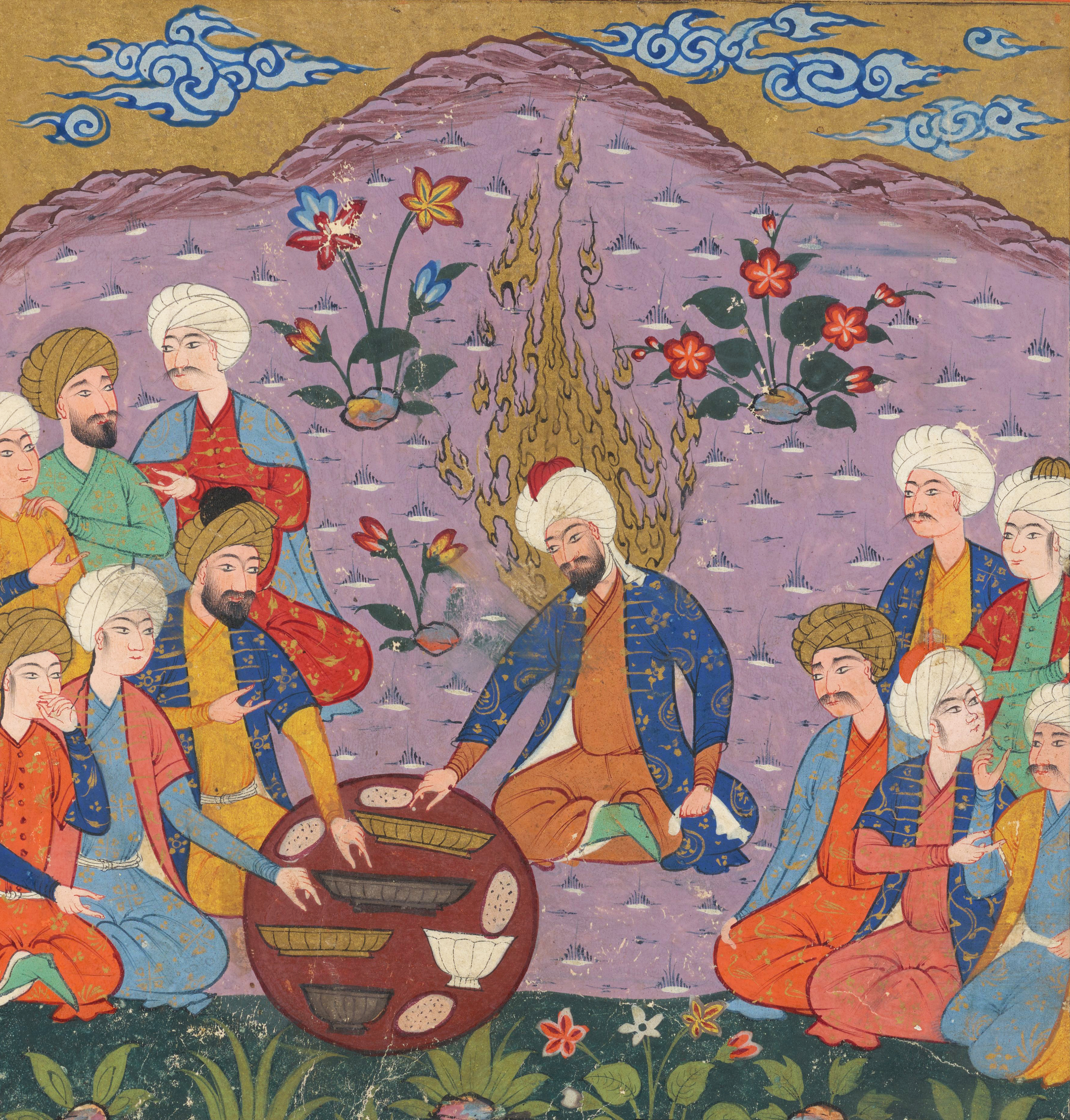
- Isa feeding his disciples with food from heaven, 1580 Persian manuscript.

Prophet of Islam
- Preceded by: Yahya
- Succeeded by: Muhammad

Personal life
- Born: c. 4 BCE Herodian Kingdom, Roman Empire
- Parent: Maryam bint Imran (mother)
- Known for: Born from a virgin; Receiving the Injīl; Being the Messiah and Word of God; Performing miracles; Ascended to heaven after escaping crucifixion, death, and resurrection c. 33 CE, Gethsemane, Jerusalem, Judea, Palestine; Arrive for a second time to kill the Dajjal
- Other name: See Names and titles of Jesus in the Quran
- Relatives: Zakariyyā (adoptive maternal grandfather); Yaḥyā ibn Zakariyyā (maternal cousin)

Religious life
- Religion: Islam

In Islam, Jesus (Arabic: عيسى بن مريم, romanized: ʿĪsā ibn Maryam, lit. 'Jesus, son of Mary'), referred to by the Arabic rendering of his name Isa, is believed to be the penultimate prophet and messenger of God (Allāh) and the messiah. He was the last messenger sent to the Israelites (Banī Isrāʾīl) and received a revelation known as the Injīl (Gospel). The Quran describes Jesus as the Messiah, Messenger of Allah, and His Word, born of a virgin, performing miracles, accompanied by disciples, and rejected by the Israelites. In contrast to Christian belief, Islamic tradition holds that Jesus was neither crucified nor killed, but was instead raised to Heaven by God. The Qurʾan places Jesus among the greatest prophets and refers to him by various titles. His prophethood was preceded by that of Yahya (John the Baptist), who acted as a verifier of the mission of Jesus and followed by Muhammad, whom Jesus is understood to have foretold in the Qurʾan under the name Ahmad.

Christians consider Jesus the incarnation of God the Son and the awaited Messiah, or Christ. The Qurʾan rejects the idea of Allah having a son - وَلَد (a "walad", which implies biological procreation/offspring and generation of another being), and states that Jesus said to worship Allah alone and that he truly (the word used isإِنِّى "inni", meaning "verily", showing that Isa really has the attributes mentioned) an 'abd (servant) and nabiyyan (someone who delivers a message on the behalf of somebody, a "prophet"), while simultaneously being called the Word of God and a spirit created by Allah. These several verses are understood as a rejection of the divinity of Jesus and his status as the Son of God, and states that Jesus did not claim to be God or the Son of God. Islam teaches that Jesus' original message was altered (taḥrīf) after his disciples claimed that he had risen from the dead. The monotheism (tawḥīd) of Jesus is emphasized in the Qurʾan. Like all prophets in Islam, Jesus is also described as a Muslim, meaning one who submits to God, as he preached that his followers should follow the 'straight path' (Ṣirāṭ al-Mustaqīm). Jesus is attributed with numerous miracles in Islamic tradition.

In Islamic eschatology, Jesus and the Mahdi are believed to appear together during the events of the End Times. Jesus will kill al-Masih ad-Dajjal (the False Messiah), after which the ancient tribe of Gog and Magog (Yaʾjūj and Maʾjūj) will emerge and spread across the earth. After God destroys them, Jesus will rule the world, establish peace and justice, and eventually die a natural death. He will be buried alongside Muhammad in the fourth reserved tomb at the Prophet's Mosque in Medina. The Umayyad Mosque in Damascus, associated with Jesus' return in the Second Coming, is highly revered by both Muslims and Christians. Jesus is also widely venerated in Sufism, with numerous ascetic and mystical works written and recited about him, in which he is often portrayed as a model of asceticism, divine love, and inner purity.

== Quran ==
Jesus is referred to in the Quran throughout 15 surahs. The Quran emphasizes Jesus as a prophet, unique in creation, born out of a virgin, and messenger from God. He is usually referred to as Īsā ibn Maryam (Jesus son of Mary), al-Masih ibn Maryam (The Christ son of Mary), al-Masīḥ – and a few times in 23:50 and 43:57 as Ibn Maryam (Son of Mary). Jesus is described as God's word (kalima), which appears to be the equivalent of the Greek logos, imparted to Mary and to be his spirit.

Yet, the Quran rejects associating partners with Allah (Surah 5:73 - rejects saying Allah is the third of three, 116 rejects associating deities aside Allah) in order to protect God's absolute unity (tawhid). Jesus is understood to have preached salvation through submission to God's will and worshipping God alone. Quran 5:116 states that Jesus will deny teaching people to consider him and his mother deities aside Allah, potentially (although disputed) matching the teachings of the Collyridians. Thus, he is considered to have been a Muslim by the religious definition of the term (i.e., one who submits to God's will).

== Birth ==
Islam's account of Jesus begins with a prologue narrated several times in the Quran which first describes the birth of his mother, Mary, and her service in the Jerusalem temple while under the care of the prophet Zechariah, who would become the father of Yahya (John the Baptist). The Quran's birth narrative of Jesus begins at Quran 19:16-34 and 3:45-53. This birth narrative has been recounted with certain variations and detailed additions by Islamic historians over the centuries. In the matter of the virgin birth of Jesus, while Islamic theology affirms Mary as a pure vessel, it does not follow the concept of Immaculate Conception as related to Mary's birth in some Christian traditions.

=== Annunciation ===
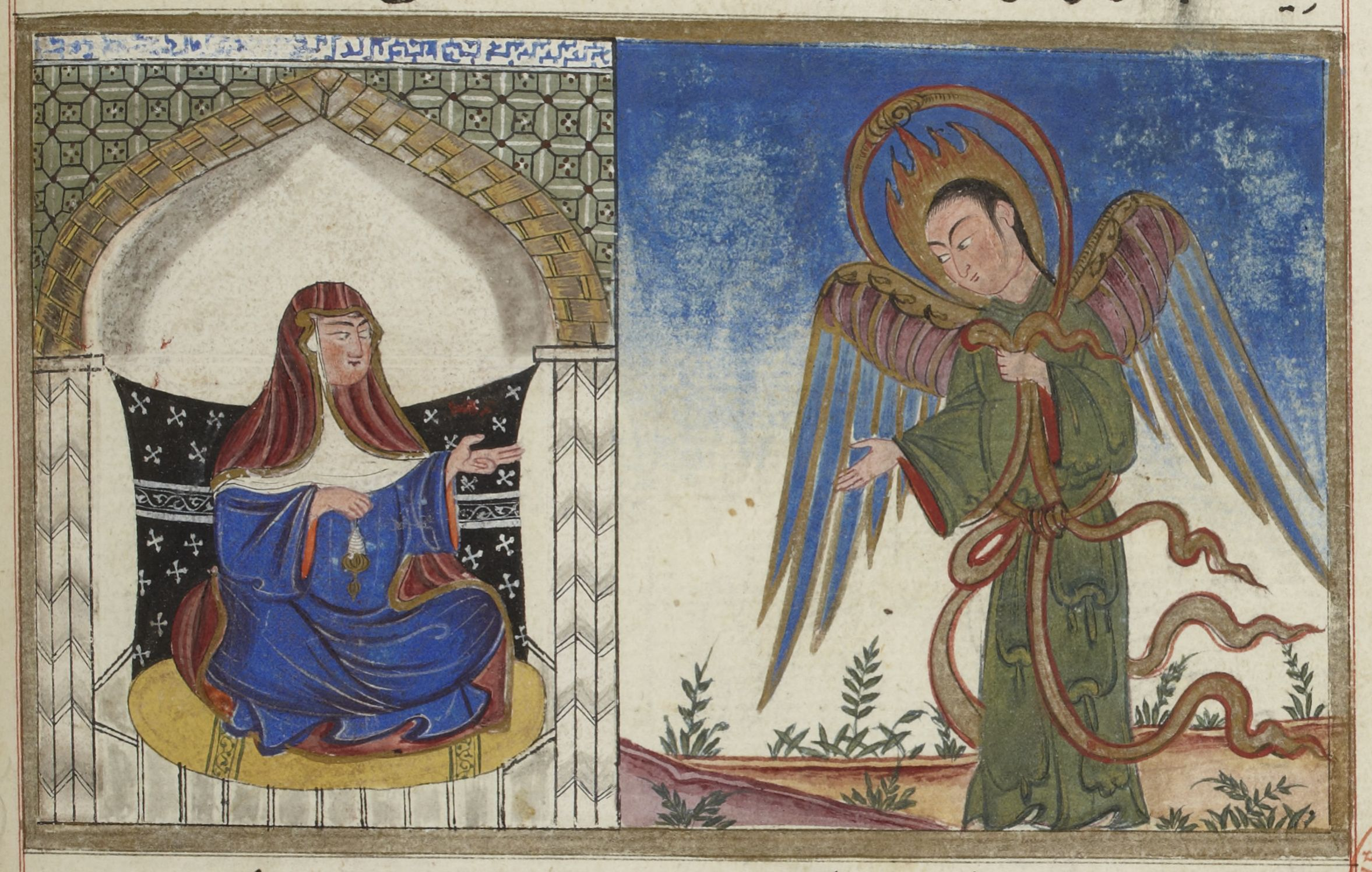
The Annunciation, from The Remaining Signs of Past Centuries, copied in 1307

Islamic exegesis affirms the virginal birth of Jesus – similarly to the Gospel account and occurring in Bethlehem. The narrative of the virgin birth opens with an announcement to Mary by the angel Gabriel while Mary is being raised in the Temple after having been pledged to God by her mother. Gabriel states she is honored over all women of all nations and has brought her glad tidings of a pure son.

Gabriel declares the son is to be named Jesus, the Messiah, proclaiming he will be called a great prophet. Mary, asking how she could conceive and have a child when no man had touched her, was answered by the angel that God can decree what he wills, and that it shall come to pass.

The narrative from the Quran continues with Mary, overcome by the pains of childbirth, being provided with a stream of water under her feet from which she could drink, and with a palm tree which she could shake so ripe dates would fall and she be enjoyed. After giving birth, Mary carries the baby Jesus back to the temple and is asked by the temple elders about the child. Having been commanded by Gabriel to a vow of silence, she points to the infant Jesus and the infant proclaims:

˹Jesus˺ declared, “I am truly a servant of Allah. He has destined me to be given the Scripture and to be a prophet.

He has made me a blessing wherever I go, and bid me to establish prayer and give alms-tax as long as I live,
and to be kind to my mother. He has not made me arrogant or defiant.

Peace be upon me the day I was born, the day I die, and the day I will be raised back to life!”

— Surah Maryam 19:30-33

Jesus speaking from the cradle is one of six miracles attributed to him in the Quran, an account which is also found in the Syriac Infancy Gospel, a sixth-century work. Referencing this tradition, an alcove-structure in the south-eastern corner of the Masjid Aqsa complex, is believed by some to be the cradle where Jesus was placed on his 40-day presentation. According to various hadiths, Jesus and Mary did not cry at birth.

=== Etymology of the name ===
The Arabic form ʿĪsā features the specific Semitic consonant ʿayin at the beginning of the word, whereas the original Hebrew and Aramaic form Yešūʿ has it at the end, aswell as another Arabic form Yašūʿ, which Arabic-speaking Christians use almost without exception. This is the result of the history of the name, which passed through East Syriac form Īšôʿ (ܝܫܘܥ) as well as Medieval Greek Iēsûs / Isus (Ἰησοῦς), and is likely to have reached the Hijaz via Eastern Arabian dialects in which word-initial glottal onsets were systematically replaced (sound shift) by an ʿayn through the so-called ʿanʿana rule. However, a historical phonological shift weakened the guttural phonemes, including the ʿayin, whose lenition widely led to its gradual loss in spoken language and also affected the pronunciation of the name.“ Furthermore, forms with an initial ʿayn (or its phonetic reflex) and an apocopated final ʿayn are attested in certain Eastern Aramaic varieties, such as Classical Mandaic, where the name for Jesus is rendered as ʿ-š-u (ࡏࡔࡅ ʿĪšū or ʿEshu), although the ʿayn there is pronounced like a regular long ī or ē.

=== Birth narratives ===
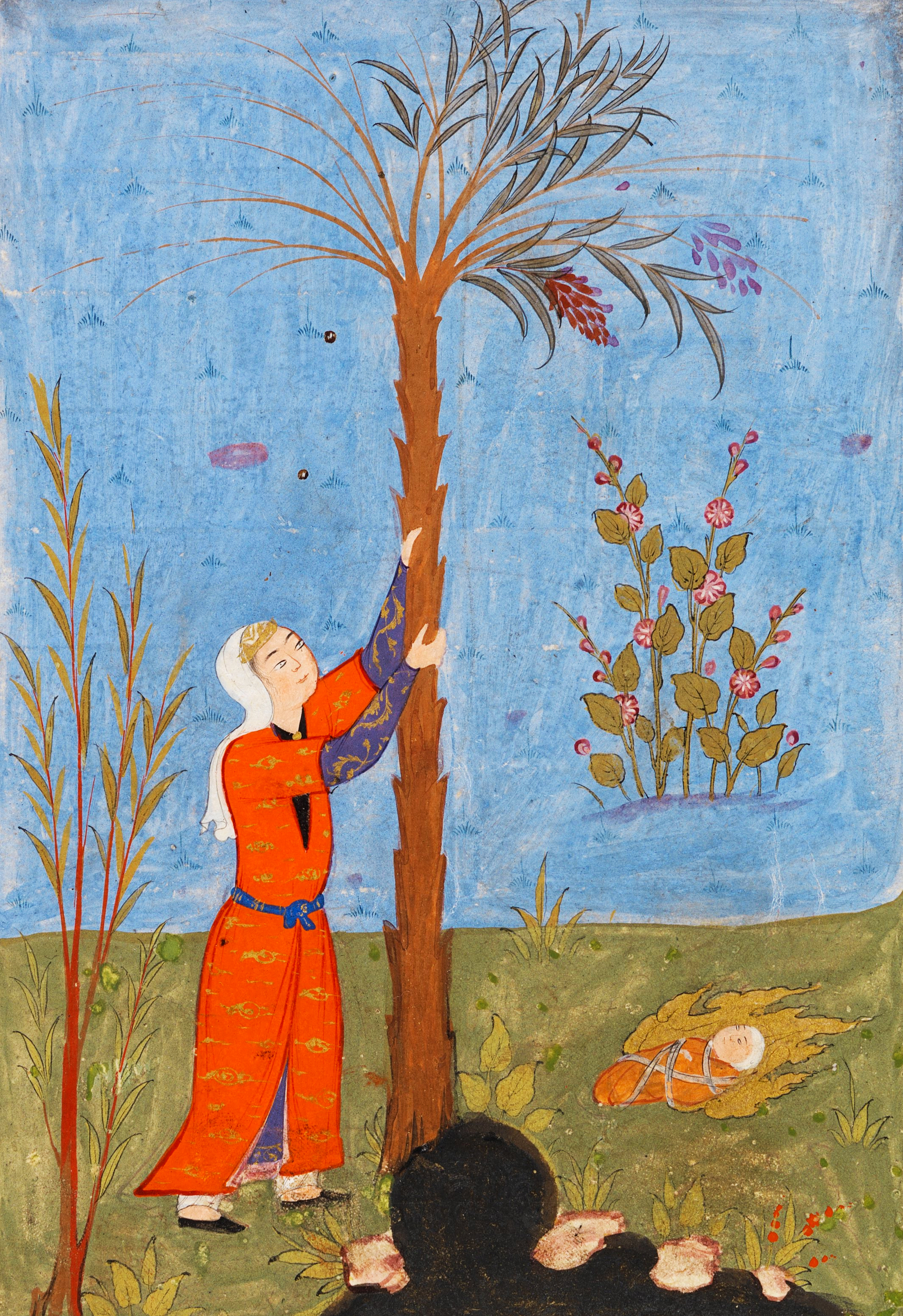
Maryam (left) shakes the palm tree under which the nativity occurred according to the Quran; baby Isa is on the right.

The Islamic faith echoed some strands within the Christian tradition that Mary (or Maryam) was a literal virgin when Jesus was conceived. The most detailed account of the annunciation and birth of Jesus is provided in Surah 3 (Al Imran) and 19 (Maryam) of the Quran, where the story is narrated that God (Allah) sent an angel to announce that Maryam could shortly expect to bear a son, despite being a virgin.

The Qurʾanic birth narrative closely resembles ones found in Christian apocryphal texts, which modern scholars consider the Qurʾanic account to be dependent on. The primary two accounts the Quʾran is thought to recount in some way are found in the Latin Gospel of Pseudo-Matthew which features a Maryam date-palm (and spring) miracle in Egypt and the Gospel of James (Note: Which is itself the primary source the Gospel of Pseudo-Matthew reworks.) which features a remote/cave birth narrative. Of additional importance are also the pictorial mosaics found in the Church of the Seat of Mary, which was converted into a mosque and served as the primary architectural inspiration for the Dome of the Rock. These mosaics already display the narrative conflation between the remote birth and the date-palm episode later found in the Quʾran. They thereby likely attest the Palestinian oral tradition recounted by the author of the Quʾran.

Despite common objections that the canonical Biblical accounts share little resemblance to the Qurʾanic account, some academics have argued that Surah 19 is particularly close to that in the canonical Christian Gospel of Luke. The Annunciation to Mary is mentioned twice in the Quran, and in both instances Mary/Maryam is told that she was chosen by God to deliver a son. In the first instance, the bearer of the news (who is believed by most Muslims to be the archangel Gabriel), delivered the news that Word from Allah with the name the Messiah, Jesus, Son of Mary is going to be born and to Allah everything is possible (3:42-47) as he (the archangel) takes the form of a man telling that the son will be a mercy from Allah to the people (19:16-22).

The details of the conception according to 66:12 (where Allah gives Mary along other righteous people) and 21:89 are that Mary conceives Jesus after Allah blown into her womb ('fanafakhna fihi') from His spirit ('min ruhina'). It appears to match the Gospel of Luke, verse 1:35, where the Archangel tells Mary that the Spirit of God "will come on you, and the power of the Most High will overshadow you", as noted by some critics. However, the understanding differs since the Islamic teaching of the Spirit of God (the Holy Spirit) is as being the same as Archangel Gabriel (although the Quran doesnt make a literal equation between them anywhere). Mary then asks how she can bear a son in view of her chastity and is told that God does as he wills, "He decrees to a matter:Be! and it Is". And that these things are easy for God.

More recently Suleiman Ali Mourad began to look at broader mythological traditions of antiquity, rather than only identifying well-established pre-Islamic Christian intertexts. He thereby identified divine birth narratives as general sources and particularly the birth of the Greek god, Apollo, as a prototype for the Quranic account.

The 8th-century Muslim historian Ibn Ishaq (704–767), wrote the account entitled Kitab al-Mubtada ('In the Beginning'), reporting that Zechariah is Mary's guardian briefly, and after being incapable of maintaining her, he entrusts her to a carpenter named George. Secluded in a church, she is joined by a young man named Joseph, and they help one another fetching water and other tasks. The account of the birth of Jesus follows the Quran's narrative, adding that the birth occurred in Bethlehem beside a palm tree with a manger.

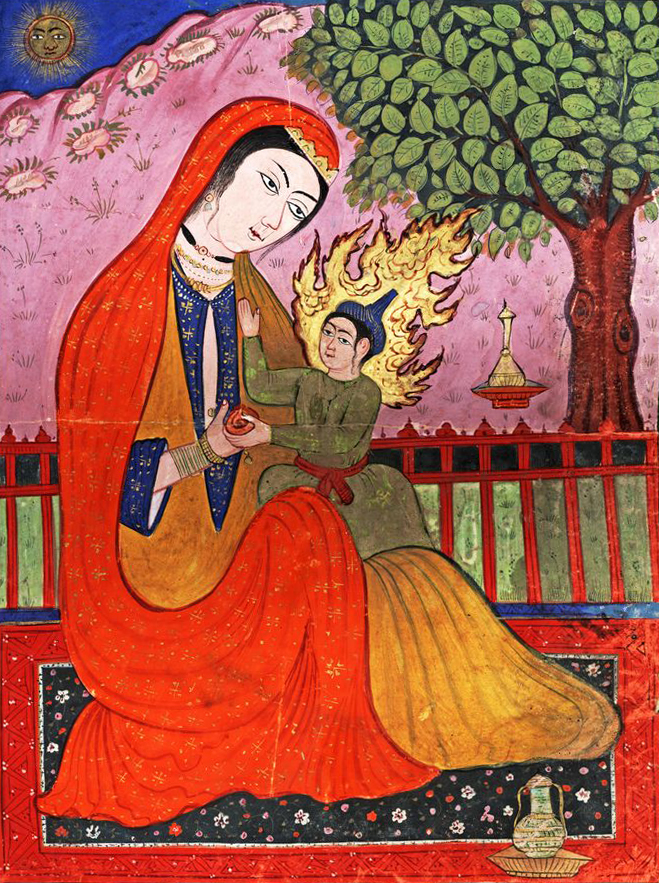
Maryam holding the baby Isa.

The 10th-century Persian scholar al-Tabari (839–923) mentions envoys arriving from the king of Persia with gifts (similar to the Magi from the east) for the Messiah; the command to a man called Joseph (not specifically Mary's husband) to take her and the child to Egypt and later return to Nazareth.

The Fatimid Ismaili jurist Qadi al-Nu'man also contributed to the narrative, explaining that the virgin birth of Jesus is meant to be interpreted symbolically. In his interpretation, Mary was the follower (lāḥiq), of the Imam Joachim (Imran). However, when Joachim realized that she was not suited for the Imamah, he passed it to Zechariah, who then passed it to John the Baptist. Meanwhile, Mary received spiritual inspiration (mādda) from God, revealing that he would invite a man (to the faith) who would become an exalted Speaker (nāṭiq) of a revealed religion (sharīʿa). According to al-Nu'man, the Quran verses "She said: Lord! How can I have a child when no man has touched me?" (3:47) and "neither have I been unchaste" (19:20) are symbolic of Mary's saying, "How can I conduct the invitation (daʿwa) when the Imam of the Time has not given me permission to do so?" and "Nor shall I be unfaithful by acting against his command", respectively. To this, a celestial hierarch replies "Such is God. He creates [i.e., causes to pass] what he wills" (Quran 3:47).

== Childhood ==
The Quran does not include the tradition of the Flight into Egypt, though sūrah 23:50 could conceivably allude to it: "And we made the son of Maryam and his mother a sign; and we made them abide in an elevated place, full of quiet and watered with springs." However, narratives similar to the narrative found in the Gospels and non-canonical sources circulated in later Islamic tradition, with some details and elaborations added over the centuries by Islamic writers and historians. Some narratives have Jesus and family staying in Egypt up to 12 years. Many moral stories and miraculous events of Jesus' youth are mentioned in Qisas al-anbiya ('Stories of the Prophets'), books composed over the centuries about pre-Islamic prophets and heroes.

Al-Masudi wrote that Jesus as a boy studied the Jewish religion reading from the Psalms and found "traced in characters of light":

You are my son and my beloved; I have chosen you for myself

with Jesus then claiming:

Today the word of God is fulfilled in the son of man.

=== In Egypt ===
Several narratives show some disparity and similarity in Islamic writings about Jesus' early childhood, specifically his time in Egypt with regard to duration and events. Most of the narratives are found in non-canonical Christian sources such as the pre-Islamic Gospel of Thomas. One such disparity is from al-Athir in his The Perfection of History which contains a birth narrative stating Jesus was born in Egypt instead of Bethlehem.

Some other narratives of Jesus' childhood are popular Middle Eastern lore as highlighted by professor of interfaith studies Mahmoud M. Ayoub. Many miracles are attributed to a young Jesus while in Egypt (see the sections Miracles and Other miracles).

== Adulthood ==
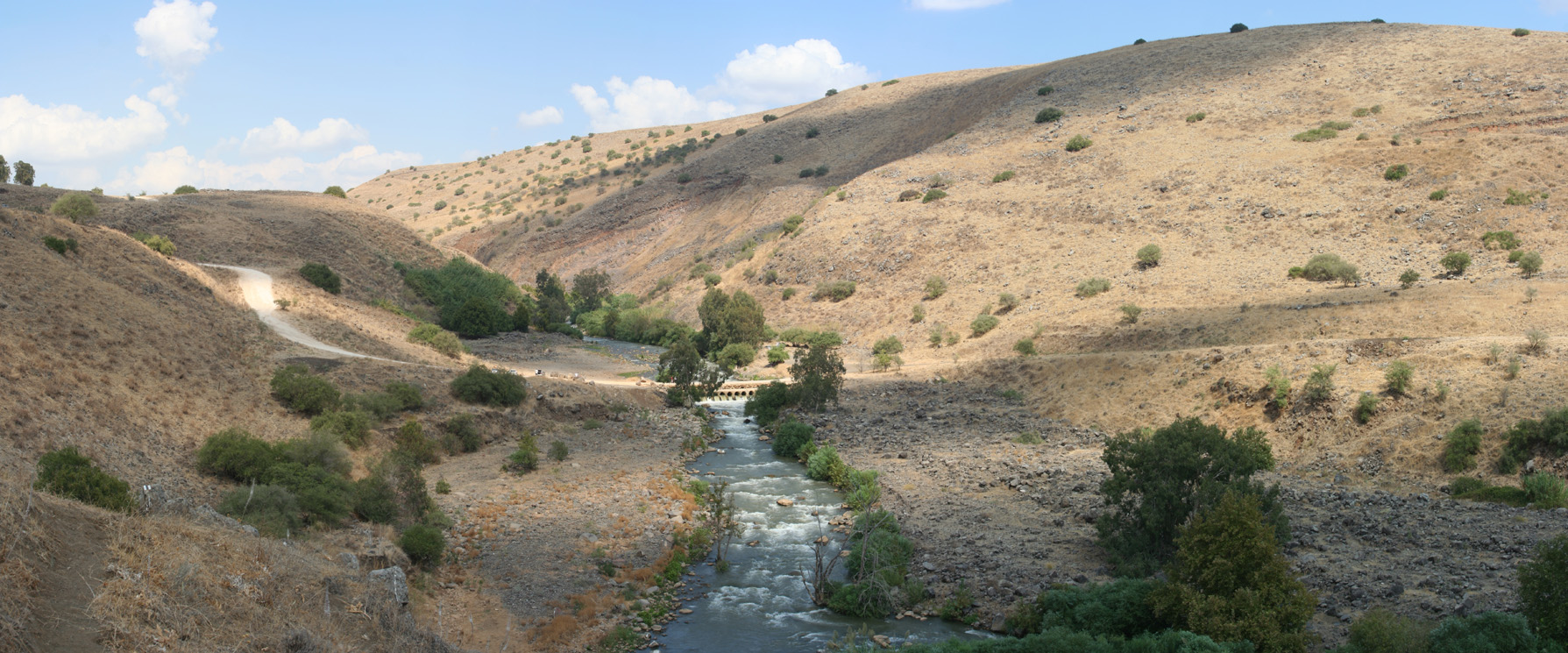
The Jordan River, where Jesus was baptized by Yahya ibn Zakariya (John the Baptist)

=== Mission ===
It is generally agreed that Jesus spoke Galilean Aramaic, a dialect of the common language of Judea in the first century and the region at-large.

The first and earliest view of Jesus formulated in Islamic thought is that of a prophet – a human being chosen by God to present both a judgment upon humanity and challenge to turn to the one true God. From this basis, reflected upon all previous prophets through the lens of Muslim identity, Jesus is considered no more than repeating a message of the ages. The miracles of Jesus and the Quranic titles attributed to him demonstrate the power of God rather than the divinity of Jesus – the same power behind the message of all prophets. Some Islamic traditions believe Jesus' mission was only to the children of Israel and his status as a prophet being confirmed by numerous miracles.

A second early high image of Jesus is an end-time figure. This concept arises mostly from the Hadith. Muslim tradition constructs a narrative similarly found in Christian theology, seeing Jesus arriving at the end of time and descending upon earth to fight the Antichrist. This narrative is understood to champion the cause of Islam, with some traditions narrating Jesus pointing to the primacy of Muhammad. Most traditions state Jesus will then die a natural death.

A third and distinctive image is of Jesus representing an ascetic figure – a prophet of the heart. Although the Quran refers to the 'gospel' of Jesus, those specific teachings of his are not mentioned in the Quran or later religious texts. They are largely absent. The Sufi tradition is where Jesus became revered, acknowledged as a spiritual teacher with a distinctive voice from other prophets, including Muhammad. Sufism tends to explore the dimensions of union with God through many approaches, including asceticism, poetry, philosophy, speculative suggestion, and mystical methods. Although Sufism to the Western mind may seem to share similar origins or elements of Neoplatonism, Gnosticism, and Buddhism, the ideology is distinctly Islamic since they adhere to the words of the Quran and pursue imitation of Muhammad as the perfect man.

=== Preaching ===
The Islamic concepts of Jesus' preaching is believed to have originated in Kufa, Iraq, under the Rashidun Caliphate where the earliest writers of Muslim tradition and scholarship was formulated. The concepts of Jesus and his preaching ministry developed in Kufa was adopted from the early ascetic Christians of Egypt who opposed official church bishopric appointments from Rome.

The earliest stories, numbering about 85, are found in two major collections of ascetic literature entitled Kitab al-Zuhd wa'l Raqa'iq ('The Book of the Asceticism and Tender Mercies') by Abd Allah ibn al-Mubarak (d. 797), and Kitab al-Zuhd ('The Book of Asceticism') by Ibn Hanbal (d. 855). These sayings fall into four basic groups:

1. eschatological sayings;
2. quasi-Gospel sayings;
3. ascetic sayings and stories;
4. sayings echoing intra-Muslim polemics.

The first group of sayings expands Jesus' archetype as portrayed in the Quran. The second group of stories, although containing a Gospel core, are expanded with a "distinctly Islamic stamp". The third group, being the largest of the four, portrays Jesus as a patron saint of Muslim asceticism. The last group builds upon the Islamic archetype and Muslim-centric definition of Jesus and his attributes, furthering esoteric ideas regarding terms such as "Spirit of God" and "Word of God" describing Jesus Christ, attributes given to the Islamic view of Jesus Christ as a holy angelic messenger divinely sent from heaven by God to his fleshly incarnation, like an Angel of the Lord in some other Messianic Christian traditions.

== Miracles ==
The Quran attributes at least six miracles to Jesus, with many more being added over the centuries by writers and historians. Miracles were attributed to Jesus as signs of his prophethood and his authority, according to educator and professor Musa Al-Husayni (d. 1990), an author most known for Mudhakkirat Dajaja ('Memoirs of a Hen') (Cairo: Dar al-Maarif, 1943; 2nd ed. 1967). In Christ in the Quran and Modern Arabic Literature (1960), Al-Husayni said it is noteworthy Muhammad attributes no miracles to himself.

These six miracles in the Quran are without detail unlike the Gospel and their non-canonical Gnostic sources, which include details and mention other attributed miracles. Over the centuries, these six miracle narratives have been elaborated through Hadith and poetry, with religious writings including some of the other miracles mentioned in the Gospel, non-canonical sources, and from lore.

=== Speaking from the cradle ===
Speaking from the cradle is mentioned in three places in the Quran: 3:46, 5:109-110 and 19:29-30. Part of the narrative has the infant Jesus defending his mother Mary from the accusation of having given birth without a known husband. Early Islam was unclear about Joseph and his role. Jesus speaks as the angel Gabriel had mentioned at the annunciation: Jesus proclaims he is a servant of God, has been given a book, is a prophet, is blessed wherever he will go, blesses the day he was born, the day he will die, and the day he is raised alive.

Although this particular narrative is not found in the Bible, the theme of speaking from the cradle is found in the non-canonical pre-Islamic Syriac Infancy Gospel. The Syriac Infancy Gospel has Jesus declaring himself the Son of God, the Word, and affirming what the angel Gabriel had previously announced to Mary as detailed in the Gospel.

=== Creating birds from clay ===
The miracle story of creating birds from clay and breathing life into them when a child is mentioned in 3:43-49, 5:109-110. Although this miracle is also not mentioned in the canonical Gospels, the same narrative is found in at least two pre-Islamic sources: the Infancy Gospel of Thomas and the Jewish Toledot Yeshu, with few variant details between the Quran and these two sources.

=== Healing the blind and the lepers ===
Similar to the New Testament, the Quran mentions Jesus healing the blind and the lepers in 3:49. Muslim scholar and judge Al-Baydawi (d. 1286) wrote how it was recorded that many thousands of people came to Jesus to be healed and that Jesus healed these diseases through prayer only. Medieval scholar Al-Tha'labi wrote about how these two particular diseases were beyond medical help, and Jesus' miracles were meant to be witnessed by others as clear signs of his message.

=== Raising the dead ===
Jesus is believed to have raised people from the dead, as mentioned in al-Imran 3:49. Although no detail is given as to who was raised or the circumstance, at least three people are mentioned in detail in the Christian Gospel (a daughter of Jairus, a widow's son at Nain, and Lazarus).

=== Prescience ===
Jesus was able to predict, or had foreknowledge, of what was hidden or unknown to others. One example is Jesus would answer correctly any and every question anyone asked him. Another example is Jesus knew what people had just eaten, as well as what they had stored in their homes.

=== Table of food from Heaven ===
In the fifth chapter of the Quran, Surah Al-Ma'idah 5:112-115, a narration mentions the disciples of Jesus requesting a table laden with food, and for it to be a special day of commemoration for them in the future. This may be a possible reference to the Eucharist according to professor of Islamic and Arabic studies W. Montgomery Watt (d. 2006). According to professor of comparative religions Geoffrey Parrinder (d. 2005), it is unclear if this story parallels the Gospel's Last Supper or the feeding the multitude, but may be tied to the Arabic word ʿīd (Muslim festival):

5:112 ˹Remember˺ when the disciples asked, “O Jesus, son of Mary! Would your Lord be willing to send down to us a table spread with food from heaven?” Jesus answered, “Fear Allah if you are ˹truly˺ believers.”
5:113 They said, “We ˹only˺ wish to eat from it to reassure our hearts, to verify you are indeed truthful to us, and to become its witnesses.”
5:114 Jesus, son of Mary, prayed, “O Allah, our Lord! Send us from heaven a table spread with food as a feast for us—the first and last of us—and as a sign from You. Provide for us! You are indeed the Best Provider.”
5:115 Allah answered, “I am sending it down to you. But whoever among you denies afterwards will be subjected to a torment I have never inflicted on anyone of My creation.”

— Surah Al-Ma'idah 5:112-115

In a record by the Sunni exegete Tabari, before the last supper, the threat of death made him anxious. Therefore, Jesus invited his disciples for the last supper. After the meal, he washed their hands and performed their ablutions to wipe their hands on his clothing. Afterwards Jesus replied to them: "As for that I have done to you tonight, in that I served you the meal and washed your hands in person, let it be an example for you. Since you indeed consider me to be better than you, do not be haughty in relation to each other but rather expand yourselves for each other as I have expanded myself for you." After instructing the disciples in his teachings, Jesus foretells that one of them would deny him and another betray him. However, in accordance with Islamic views on Jesus' death, just a corpse in semblance of Jesus was crucified and Jesus himself was raised to God.

=== Other miracles ===
Many stories and narratives have been developed over the years about Jesus, containing certain inherent lessons or providing meaning due to the lack of detail in the Quran regarding Jesus. Some of these narratives are similar in nature to the New Testament, while some portray Jesus in a very human manner.

Besides some detailed summaries of miracles of Jesus mentioned by Muslim writers over the centuries, from adulthood (like walking on water – also found in the Gospel – and causing loaves of bread to come from the ground), some other miracles from childhood include: explaining the Muslim creed fundamentals to a schoolmaster, revealing who the thieves were to a wealthy chief, filling empty jars of something to drink, providing food and wine for a tyrannical king while also proving to this king his power in raising a man from the dead, raising a child accidentally killed, and causing the garments from a single-colored vat to come out with various colors.

==== Healing a royal official's son ====
Al-Tabari (d. 923) reports a story of an adult Jesus' encounter with a certain king in the region and the healing of his son. The identity of the king is not mentioned while legend suggests Philip the Tetrarch. The corresponding Bible reference is "the royal official's son".

==== Greed and truth-telling ====
A legendary story of a miracle by a young Jesus, used as a hard-learned lesson popularly found in Middle Eastern lore according to professor Ayoub, has to do with a Jewish man and loaves of bread. Although carrying a polemic tone, the lesson centers on greed with truth-telling woven into the narration. It is a story found often in children's books.

==== Inherent wisdom ====
Another legendary miracle story is one regarding Jesus' childhood wisdom. This legend, reported through al-Tabari from ibn Ishaq, talks about Mary sending Jesus to a religious school and the teacher being astonished to find Jesus already knowing the information being taught / discussed.

==== Food in children's homes ====
Another story from al-Tabari tells of a young Jesus playing with the youths of his village and telling them what food their parents were preparing for them at home.

According to the details of the narrative, some parents became annoyed and forbade their children to play with Jesus, suspecting he was a magician. As a result, the parents kept their children away from Jesus and gathered their children into a single house. One day, feeling lonely, Jesus went out looking for his friends, and coming upon this house he asked the parents where their children were. The parents lied, responding that the children were not there. After Jesus asks who, then, is in the house, the parents replied that there were swine inside. Jesus then says "Let them be swine!", with the parents then discovering that all the children had turned into swine.

Over the centuries, Muslim writers have also referenced other miracles like casting out demons, having borrowed from some heretical pre-Islamic sources, and from canonical sources as legends about Jesus were expanded.

== Revelation ==
Muslims believe that God revealed a new scripture to Jesus, called the al-Injil (the Gospel), while also declaring the truth of the previous revelations: al-Tawrat (the Torah) and al-Zabur (the Psalms). The Quran speaks favorably of al-Injīl, which it describes as a scripture that fills the hearts of its followers with meekness and piety. Traditional Islamic exegesis claims the biblical message to have been distorted (tahrif), is termed ta'yin al-mubham ("resolution of ambiguity"). This polemic effort has its origins in the medieval period with Abd al-Jabbar ibn Ahmad's writings. Regarding the Law of Moses, the Quran indicates that Jesus never abolished Jewish laws but rather confirmed them, while making partial abrogations only.

Muslims have long believed that Paul purposefully corrupted the original teachings of Jesus. The 9th-century historian Sayf ibn Umar asserted that certain rabbis persuaded Paul to deliberately misguide early Christians by introducing what Ibn Hazm viewed as objectionable doctrines into Christianity.

According to Yusuf al-Qaradawi in his book The Lawful and the Prohibited in Islam, the legal restrictions Jesus abrogated for Jews were those initially legislated by God as a punishment. Classical commentaries such as Tafsir al-Jalalayn specify they pertained to the consumption of fish and bird meat without spikes, or in general.

== Disciples ==
The Quran states that Jesus was aided by a group of disciples (Ḥawāriyyūn) who believed in his message. While not naming the disciples, the Quran does give a few instances of Jesus preaching the message to them. Muslims view the disciples of Jesus as identical to the companions (Ṣaḥāba) of Muhammad. According to Christianity, the names of the twelve disciples were Peter, Andrew, James, John, Philip, Bartholomew, Thomas, Matthew, James, Jude, Simon, and Judas.

The Quran mentions in chapter 3, verses 52–53, that the disciples submitted to the faith of Islam:

When Jesus sensed disbelief from his people, he asked, “Who will stand up with me for Allah?” The disciples replied, “We will stand up for Allah. We believe in Allah, so bear witness that we have submitted.”
˹They prayed to Allah,˺ “Our Lord! We believe in Your revelations and follow the messenger, so count us among those who bear witness.”

— Surah Al Imran 3:52-53

The longest narrative involving Jesus' disciples is when Jesus performs the miracle of bringing a table of food from heaven at their request, for further proof that his preaching is the true message.

== Ascension ==
Surah An-Nisa 4:157 is the primary verse of the Quran to refer to the event of Jesus' crucifixion. It is part of a polemic where the Jews, who received the Scripture before, are accused of breaking the Sabbath, killed the prophets unjustly, of accusing Mary, and for boasting that "We killed the Messiah, Jesus, the son of Mary". It says that they (the "boasters") neither killed and neither crucified Jesus, but "it was made to appear so to them":

An-Nisa's verse 157

And because of their saying: We slew the Messiah, Jesus son of Mary, Allah's messenger - they slew him not nor crucified him, but it appeared so unto them; and lo! those who disagree concerning it are in doubt thereof; they have no knowledge thereof save pursuit of a conjecture; they slew him not for certain.

Most Islamic traditions categorically deny that Jesus physically died on the cross or otherwise. According to the Quran, they did not crucify him, but was rather raised by God. Noteworthy, some scholars say that it is not object to the text the Crucifixion itself, nor the death of Jesus, rather the polemic against the Jews (who took credit for the act done by the Romans). (Although the earliest Islamic traditions and exegesis quote somewhat conflicting reports regarding a death and its length, Muslims believe that Jesus did not die on the cross, but believe that he was saved by being raised alive to heaven.) A minority, especially among the falāsifa, and some Ismāʿīlī interpreted walākin s̲h̲ubbiha lahum as meaning that the Jews intended to annihilate Jesus completely; but in fact, they crucified only his nāsūt (form), yet his lāhūt remained alive. The view is also recalled by some Sufis.

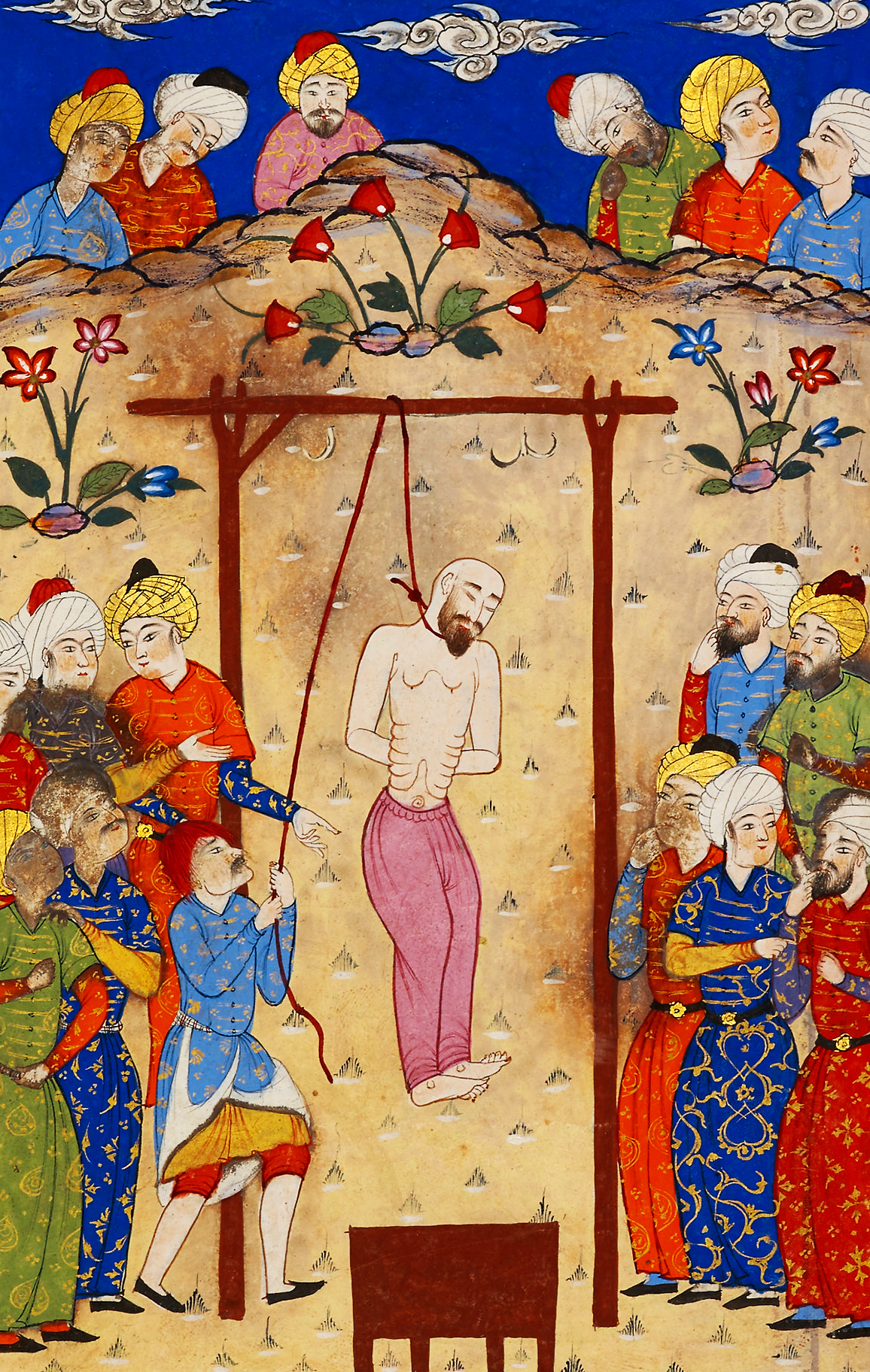
Islamic illustration of a man outwardly appearing as Isa to the Jews, being hanged by them.

=== Substitution ===
It is unclear exactly where the substitution interpretation originated, but some scholars consider the theory originating among certain Gnostic groups of the second century.

Some disagreement and discord can be seen beginning with Ibn Ishaq's (d. 761) report of a brief accounting of events leading up to the crucifixion, firstly stating that Jesus was replaced by someone named Sergius, while secondly reporting an account of Jesus' tomb being located at Medina, and thirdly citing the places in the Quran (3:55, 4:158) that God took Jesus up to himself.

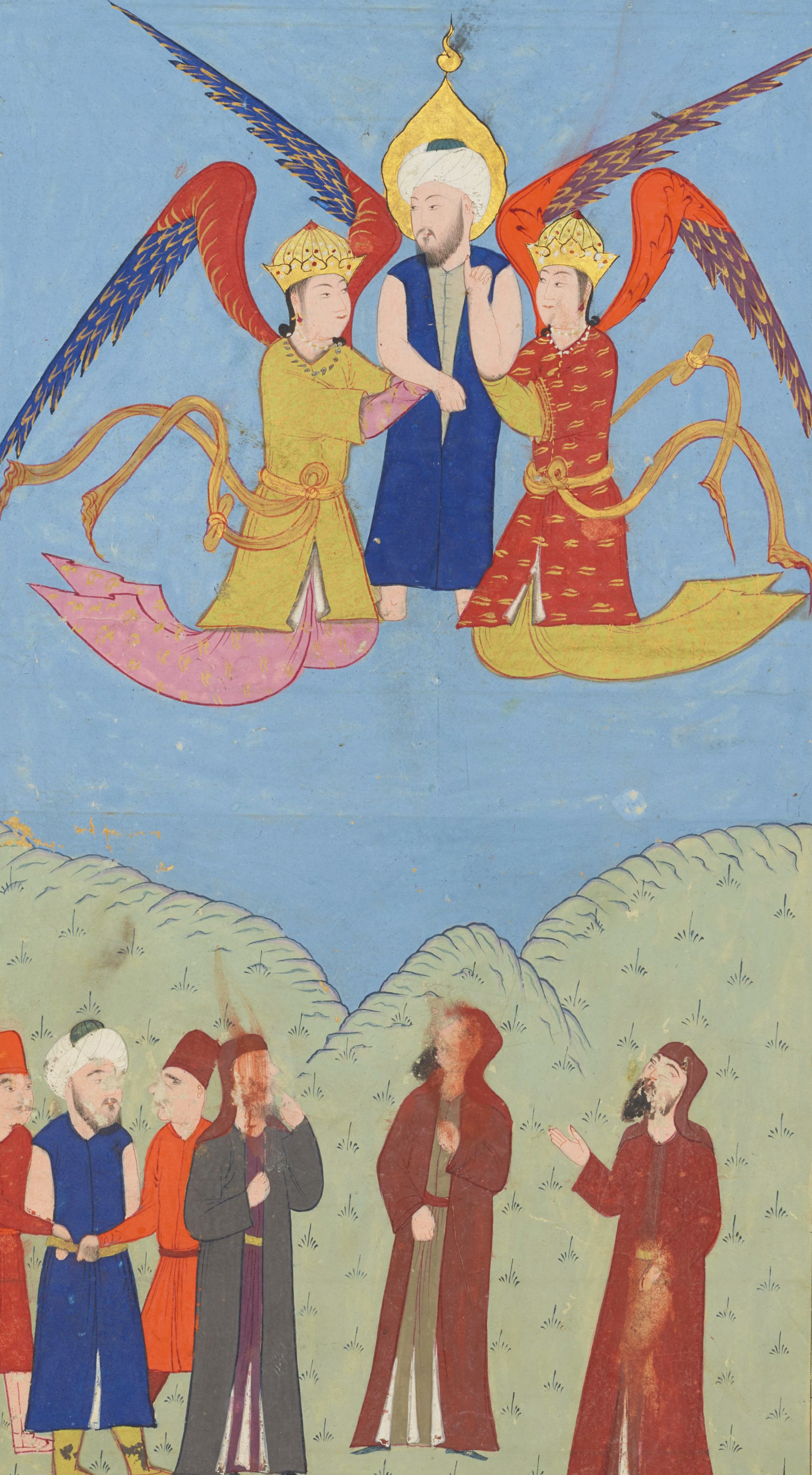
Islamic depiction of Isa's Ascension.

Michael Cook notes that denial that Jesus died follows the Christian heresy of docetism, who were "disturbed by that God should have died", but that this concern conflicts with another Islamic doctrine, that Jesus was a man, not God. According to Todd Lawson, Quranic commentators seem to have concluded the denial of the crucifixion of Jesus by following material interpreted in Tafsir that relied upon extra-biblical Judeo-Christian sources, with the earliest textual evidence having originated from a non-Muslim source – a misreading of the Christian writings of John of Damascus regarding the literal understandings of docetism (exegetical doctrine describing spiritual and physical realities of Jesus as understood by men in logical terms) as opposed to their figurative explanations. John of Damascus highlighted the Quran's assertion that the Jews did not crucify Jesus being very different from saying that Jesus was not crucified, explaining that it is the varied Quranic exegetes in Tafsir, and not the Quran itself, that denies the crucifixion, further stating that the message in the 4:157 verse simply affirms the historicity of the event.

=== Symbolic interpretations ===
Ja'far ibn Mansur al-Yaman (d. 958), Abu Hatim Ahmad ibn Hamdan al-Razi (d. 935), Abu Yaqub al-Sijistani (d. 971), Mu'ayyad fi'l-Din al-Shirazi (d. 1078) and the group Ikhwan al-Safa also affirm the historicity of the Crucifixion, reporting Jesus was crucified and not substituted by another man as maintained by many other popular Quranic commentators and Tafsir. More recently, Mahmoud M. Ayoub, a professor and scholar, provided a more symbolic interpretation for Surah 4 Verse 157:

The Quran, as we have already argued, does not deny the death of Christ. Rather, it challenges human beings who in their folly have deluded themselves into believing that they would vanquish the divine Word, Jesus Christ the Messenger of God. The death of Jesus is asserted several times and in various contexts. (3:55, 5:117, 19:33)

Ayoub, instead of interpreting the passage as a denial of the death of Jesus, instead believes the passage is about God denying men the power to vanquish and destroy God's message. The words "but they killed him not, nor crucified him" are meant to show that any power humans believe that they have against God is illusory.

Some Sunni Islamic exegesists, such as the Islamist polemicist Muhammad Rashid Rida, held an ambiguous stance on the matter, namely that the crucifixion and ascension of Jesus were allegorical, but with extreme precaution, in order to rebut Christian doctrines on crucifixion and salvation. Comprehensively denouncing Christian doctrines on salvation, atonement and crucifixion as irrational and kufr (disbelief) in his Tafsir al-Manar, Rida also denounced the Jews for their killings of the Prophets of God, writing:

The actual fact of the crucifixion is not itself a matter which the Book of God seeks to affirm or deny, except for the purpose of asserting the killing of prophets by the Jews unjustly, and reproaching them for that act;... that the Creator of the universe could be incarnated in the womb of a woman in this earth which, in comparison to the rest of His creation, is like an atom, and then be a human being eating and drinking, experiencing fatigue and suffering other hardships like the rest of mankind. Then His enemies would level at Him insults and pain, and finally crucify Him with thieves and declare Him cursed according to the Book He revealed to one of His apostles, exalted be He over all this! ... We say rather no one believes it because belief (iman) is the affirmation (tasdiq) by reason of something that it can apprehend;... The claim of the people of the Cross, therefore, that clemency and forgiveness are opposed to justice, is unacceptable.

— Imam Muhammad Rashid Rida, in Tafsir al-Manar Vol. VI pp. 23, 26-27,

As an early exegesis of verse 3:55, Al-Tabari (d. 923) records an interpretation attributed to Ibn 'Abbas, who used the literal "I will cause you to die" (mumayyitu-ka) in place of the metaphorical mutawaffi-ka ('Jesus died'), while Wahb ibn Munabbih, an early Jewish convert, is reported to have said "God caused Jesus, son of Mary, to die for three hours during the day, then took him up to himself." Tabari further transmits from Ibn Ishaq: "God caused Jesus to die for seven hours", while at another place reported that a person called Sergius was crucified in place of Jesus. Ibn-al-Athir forwarded the report that it was Judas, the betrayer, while also mentioning the possibility it was a man named Natlianus.

In reference to the Quranic quote "We have surely killed Jesus the Christ, son of Mary, the apostle of God" (4:157), Muslim scholar Mahmoud Ayoub asserts this boast not as the repeating of a historical lie or the perpetuating of a false report, but an example of human arrogance and folly with an attitude of contempt towards God and his messenger(s). Ayoub furthers what modern scholars of Islam interpret regarding the historical death of Jesus, the man, as man's inability to kill off God's Word and the Spirit of God, which the Quran testifies were embodied in Jesus Christ. Ayoub continues highlighting the denial of the killing of Jesus as God denying men such power to vanquish and destroy the divine Word. The words, "they did not kill him, nor did they crucify him" speaks to the profound events of ephemeral human history, exposing mankind's heart and conscience towards God's will. The claim of humanity to have this power against God is illusory. "They did not slay him ... but it seemed so to them" speaks to the imaginations of mankind, not the denial of the actual event of Jesus dying physically on the cross.

Another report from Ibn Kathir quotes Ishaq Ibn Bishr, on authority of Idris, on authority of Wahb ibn Munabbih, that "God caused him to die for three days, then resurrected him, then raised him."

Al-Masudi (d. 956) reported the death of Christ under Tiberius.

Ibn Kathir (d. 1373) follows traditions which suggest that a crucifixion did occur, but not with Jesus. After the event, Ibn Kathir reports the people were divided into three groups following three different narratives: the Jacobites believing "God remained with us as long as He willed and then He ascended to Heaven"; the Nestorians believing "The son of God was with us as long as he willed until God raised him to heaven"; and the Muslims believing "The servant and messenger of God, Jesus, remained with us as long as God willed until God raised him to Himself."

Islamic reformer Muhammad Rashid Rida agrees with contemporary commentators interpreting the physical killing of Christ's apostleship as a metaphorical interpretation.

Modern Islamic scholars like Sayyid Muhammad Husayn Tabataba'i interpret the ascension of Jesus as spiritual, not physical. This interpretation is in accord with Muʿtazila and Shia metaphorical explanations regarding anthropomorphic references to God in the Quran. Although not popular with traditional Sunni interpretations of the depiction of crucifixion, there has been much speculation and discussion in the effort of logically reconciling this topic.

In ascetic Shia writings, Jesus is depicted having "ascended to heaven wearing a woolen shirt, spun and sewed by Mary, his mother. As he reached the heavenly regions, he was addressed, 'O Jesus, cast away from you the adornment of the world.'" After his ascension, his word is believed to have been altered.

== Apocalyptic literature ==
According to Islamic apocalyptics, having ascended to heaven and dwelled there for 2000+ years, Jesus will descend to earth shortly before Judgement Day, in the midst of wars fought against al-Masih ad-Dajjal ('The False Messiah") and his followers, to come to the aid of the Mahdi and his Muslim followers. Dressed in saffron robes with his head anointed, Jesus will descend at the point of a white minaret, in eastern Damascus, which is believed to be the Minaret of Isa in the Umayyad Mosque. He will then greet the Mahdi and (being a Muslim) pray beside him. Eventually, Jesus will slay the Dajjal at Lod.

Afterwards, he will "break the cross, kill the pigs, and abolish the Jizya tax", according to a well-known Sahih al-Bukhari hadith. "The usual interpretation" of this prophecy is that, being a Muslim, Jesus will put a stop to Christian worship of himself and in belief in his divinity, "symbolized by the cross". He will re-establish the Kosher/Halal dietary laws abandoned by Christianity; and because Jews and Christians will now all reject their former faith and accept Islam, there will be no more need for the jizya tax on unbelievers. (According to one hadith, Jesus will "destroy the churches and temples and kill the Christians unless they believe in him.") (Note: see also: "Others, however, understand the second coming of 'Isa ... [is] to kill the Dajjal, to break the cross and decimate all Christians and their places of worship, and to inaugurate the aforementioned period of peace before the actual coming of the Hour".)

Islamic texts also allude to the reappearance of the ancient menace Gog and Magog (Yaʾjūj Maʾjūj), which will break out of its underground confinement and cause havoc around the world. God, in response to Jesus' prayers, will kill them by sending a type of worm in the napes of their necks, and send large birds to carry and clear their corpses from the land. After the death of the Mahdi, Jesus will assume world leadership and peace and justice will be universal.

Also according to tradition, Jesus will then marry, have children, and rule the world for forty years (traditions give many different time periods) after which he will die. Some Muslims believe that the Muslims will then perform the funeral prayer for him and then bury him at the Green Dome in the city of Medina in a grave left vacant beside Muhammad, Abu Bakr, and Umar respectively. According to Ibn Khaldun's legend, the two caliphs will rise from the dead between the two prophets.

Timeline of the arrival of Jesus before Judgement Day

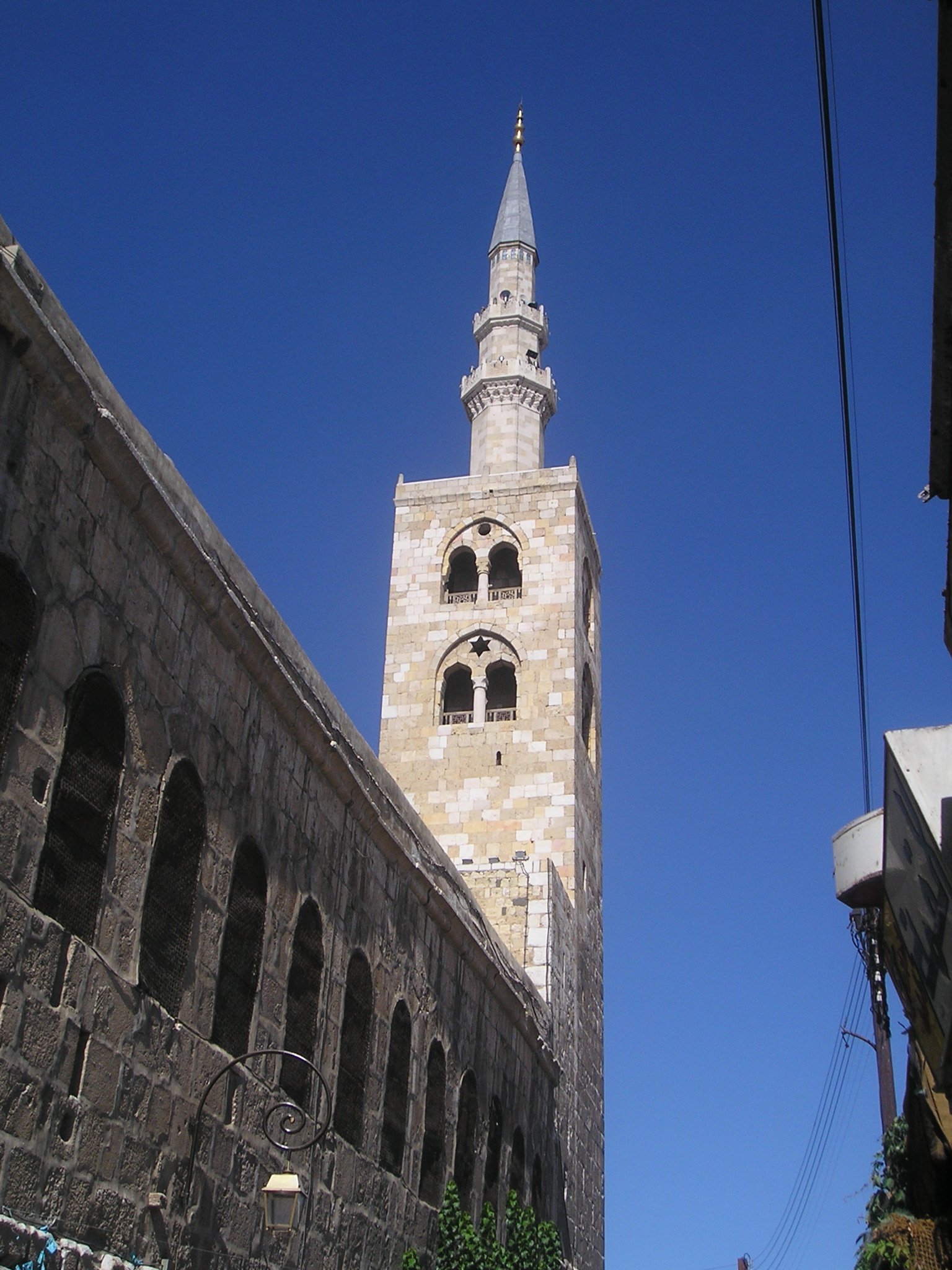
Minaret of Isa in the Umayyad Mosque, Damascus, Syria

=== Sources ===
While the Quran does not describe any of the above narrative of Jesus' return, many Muslims believe that two Quranic verses refer to his second coming during the end times. (1) The verse mentioned above stating he has never died on earth:

- "And because of their saying: We slew the Messiah, Jesus son of Mary, Allah's messenger - they slew him not nor crucified him, but it appeared so unto them; and lo! those who disagree concerning it are in doubt thereof; they have no knowledge thereof save pursuit of a conjecture; they slew him not for certain." (Q.4:157 trans Pickthall)

A second verse interpreted to indicate a connection between Jesus and "the Hour" (end times):

- "And lo! verily there is knowledge of the Hour. So doubt ye not concerning it, but follow Me. This is the right path." (Q.43:61 trans Pickthall).

Hadiths on Jesus's return are traced back to Abu Hurairah, one of the sahaba, but might actually have been introduced later during civil wars in the early Abbasid Caliphate, when a savior was expected. While for Shias, the Mahdi will be the savior, some Sunnis tended to expect Jesus' return. During the early Abbasid Caliphate, wearing crucifixes in processions and holding pigs in public, was forbidden. Otherwise, the breaking of the cross, might reflect general disapproval of this symbol by Muslims, and slaying pigs a reference to Jesus exorcism of Legion.

== Islamic theology ==
Muslims do not worship Jesus, who is known as Isa in Arabic, nor do they consider him divine, but they do believe that he was a prophet or messenger of God and he is called the Messiah in the Quran. However, by affirming Jesus as Messiah they are attesting to his messianic message, not his mission as a heavenly Christ. [...] Islam insists that neither Jesus nor Muhammad brought a new religion. Both sought to call people back to what might be called "Abrahamic faith." This is precisely what we find emphasized in the book of James. Like Islam, the book of James, and the teaching of Jesus in Q, emphasize doing the will of God as a demonstration of one's faith. [...] Since Muslims reject all of the Pauline affirmations about Jesus, and thus the central claims of orthodox Christianity, the gulf between Islam and Christianity on Jesus is a wide one.

— Professor James D. Tabor in his book The Jesus Dynasty

Jesus is described in various ways in the Quran. The most common reference to Jesus occurs in the form of Ibn Maryam ('son of Mary'), sometimes preceded with another title. Jesus is also recognized as a nabī ('prophet') and rasūl ('messenger') of God. The terms 'abd-Allāh ('servant of God'), wadjih ('worthy of esteem in this world and the next') and mubārak ('blessed', or 'a source of benefit for others') are all used in reference to him. According to Islam, Jesus never claimed to be divine.

Jesus' role in Muslim theology falls roughly under four types:

- a perception based on fragments of the New Testament
- exposing thieves, criminals, and liars (those who prey on those in need in general)
- an ascetic, based on monastic tradition; prevalent particularly in Sufi literature
- an Islamic messenger, exercising polemics against Christians and predicting the coming of Muhammad (as Surah 61:6)

Islam sees Jesus as human, sent as the last prophet of Israel to Jews with the Gospel scripture, affirming but modifying the Mosaic Law. Islamic accounts have rejected any divine notions of Jesus being God, or the begotten Son of God, or of the Trinity. Islamic theology teaches such beliefs constitute shirk (the "association" of partners with God) and thereby a rejection of his divine oneness (tawhid) as the sole unpardonable sin. According to Islamic theology, Jesus received an original message, containing references to Muhammad, but which became distorted later under Jewish and Roman influence. Rather than being divine or a savior, Jesus conforms to the Islamic concept of prophetic mission. The strict monotheism of Islam rejects any Christological debate which conflates Jesus in any way with Allah or with God the Father, precluding any divinity in Jesus and avoiding the subtleties of Trinitarianism.

A frequent title of Jesus mentioned is al-Masīḥ, which translates to 'the Messiah', as well as 'Christ'. Although the Quran is silent on its significance, Muslim scholars disagree with the Christian concepts of the term "Messiah", and lean towards a Jewish understanding. Muslim exegetes explain the use of the word masīh in the Quran as referring to Jesus' status as the one anointed by means of blessings and honors; or as the one who helped cure the sick, by anointing the eyes of the blind, for example.

Jesus is also associated both with a word from God and with a spirit. The interpretations are collected by the Quran exegete Mahmud al-Alusi: Jesus is the embodiment of God's word uttered at the moment of his conception (9:169, 14:30, 3:42), announced in the "word of God", prophesied preached by preceding prophets; Jesus is the word of God because he speaks on behalf of God; or that Jesus is a word of God because Jesus is, in his own person, “good news”.

Muhammad described himself as the "nearest of all people to Jesus".

=== Similitude with Adam ===
The Quran emphasizes Allah's creation of Jesus: "The case of Jesus in the eyes of God is like that of Adam. He created him from earth and then said to him, 'Be!' And he is." (Q:3:59), through his similitude with Adam in regards to the absence of human origin. Muhammad often used to compare the births of Adam and Jesus.

Islamic exegesis extrapolates a logical inconsistency behind the Christian argument of divine intervention, as such implications would have ascribed divinity to Adam who is understood only as creation.

=== Precursor to Muhammad ===
In Islam, Jesus is believed to have been the precursor to the Islamic prophet Muhammad. According to the Quran, the coming of Muhammad was predicted by Jesus in 61:6. Through this verse, early Arab Muslims claimed legitimacy for their new faith in the existing religious traditions and the alleged predictions of Jesus. Muslims believe that Jesus was a precursor to Muhammad, and that he prophesied the latter's coming. This perspective is based on a verse of the Quran wherein Jesus speaks of a messenger to appear after him named "Ahmad". Islam associates Ahmad with Muhammad, both words deriving from the h-m-d triconsonantal root which refers to praiseworthiness. Muslims assert that evidence of Jesus' pronouncement is present in the New Testament, citing the mention of the Paraclete whose coming is foretold in the Gospel of John.

Muslim commentators claim that the original Greek word used was periklutos, meaning 'famed', 'illustrious', or 'praiseworthy'—rendered in Arabic as Ahmad; and that this was replaced by Christians with parakletos. This idea is debated, asking if the traditional understanding is supported by the text of the Quran.

Islamic theology claims Jesus had foretold another prophet succeeding him according to Sura 61:6, with the mention of the name 'Ahmad'. (Ahmad is an Arabic name from the same triconsonantal root Ḥ-M-D = [ح – م – د].) In responding to Ibn Ishaq's biography of Muhammad, the Sirat Rasul Allah, Islamic scholar Alfred Guillaume wrote:

Coming back to the term "Ahmad", Muslims have suggested that Ahmad is the translation of periklutos, celebrated or the Praised One, which is a corruption of parakletos, the Paraclete of John XIV, XV and XVI.

=== Messianism ===
An alternative, more esoteric, interpretation is expounded by Messianic Muslims in the Sufi and Isma'ili traditions so as to unite Islam, Christianity and Judaism into a single religious continuum. Other Messianic Muslims hold a similar theological view regarding Jesus, without attempting to unite the religions. Making use of the New Testament's distinguishing between Jesus, Son of Man (being the physical human Jesus), and Christ, Son of God (being the Holy Spirit of God residing in the body of Jesus), the Holy Spirit, being immortal and immaterial, is not subject to crucifixion – for it can never die, nor can it be touched by the earthly nails of the crucifixion, for it is a being of pure spirit. Thus, while the spirit of Christ avoided crucifixion by ascending unto God, the body that was Jesus was sacrificed on the cross, thereby bringing the Old Testament to final fulfillment. Thus Quranic passages on the death of Jesus affirm that while the Pharisees intended to destroy Jesus completely, they, in fact, succeeded only in killing the Son of Man, being his nasut ('material being'). Meanwhile, the Son of God, being his lahut ('spiritual being') remained alive and undying – because it is the Holy Spirit.

== Islamic literature ==
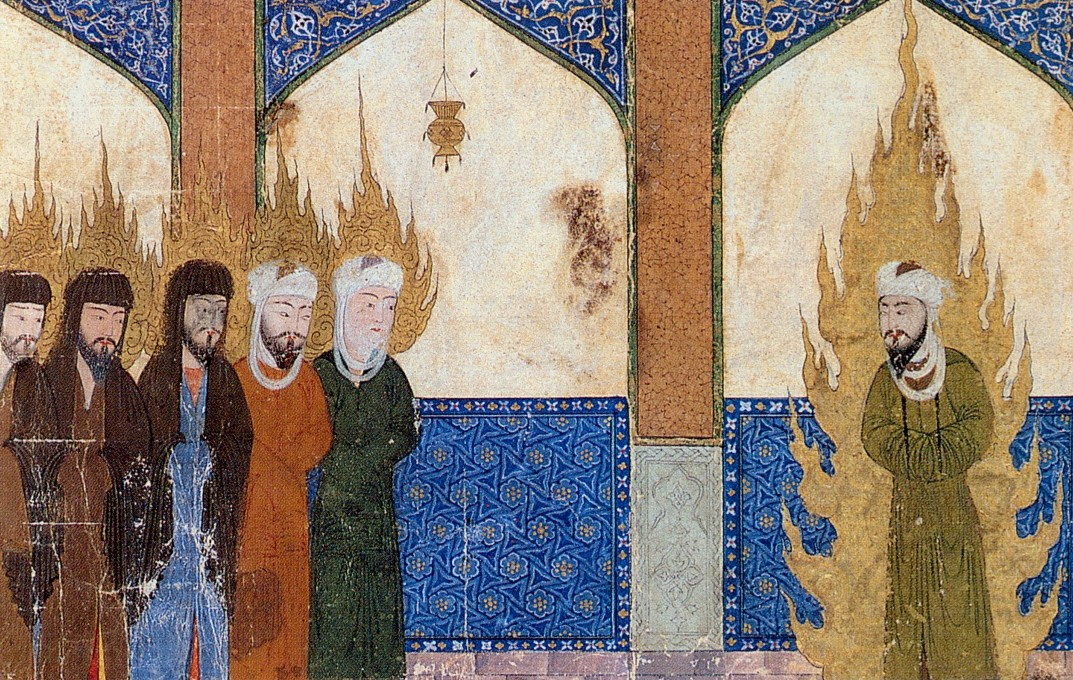
Muhammad leads Abraham, Moses, Jesus and others in prayer. Persian miniature, 15th century

The Quran does not convey the specific teachings of Jesus. What has developed over the years was authored by later followers of Islam. What is found in the Quran about Jesus is that his teaching conformed to the prophetic model: a human sent by God to present both a judgment upon humanity for worshipping idols and a challenge to turn to the one true God. In the case of Jesus, Muslims believe that his mission was to the people of Israel and that his status as a prophet was confirmed by numerous miracles. The Quran's description of specific events at the end of Jesus' life have continued to be controversial between Christians and Muslims, while the classical commentaries have been interpreted differently to accommodate new information. Jesus is written about by some Muslim scholars as the perfect man.

=== Hadith ===
The Hadiths are reported sayings of Muhammad that developed a canonical status in the third Muslim century as a source of authority for the Muslim community. The Muslim perception of Jesus emerging from the Hadiths is of a miraculous, sinless, and eschatological figure, pointing people, again according to the Muslim's perspective of prophethood, to the Muslim faith (Muslim; one who submits to the will of God).

Jesus is featured as a major figure in two categories of hadiths which can be described as apocalyptic and biblical. The eschatological role of Jesus in the hadiths may have been influenced by ideas of the Second coming held by the Eastern Churches, as well as the Quranic Jesus mentioned in 43:61. Many of the hadiths which feature Jesus's sayings were not included in the canonical hadith collections, which became more focused on the sayings of Muhammad, but were instead included in a separate genre known as Qisas al-anbiya ('Stories of the Prophets').

=== Sunni Islam ===
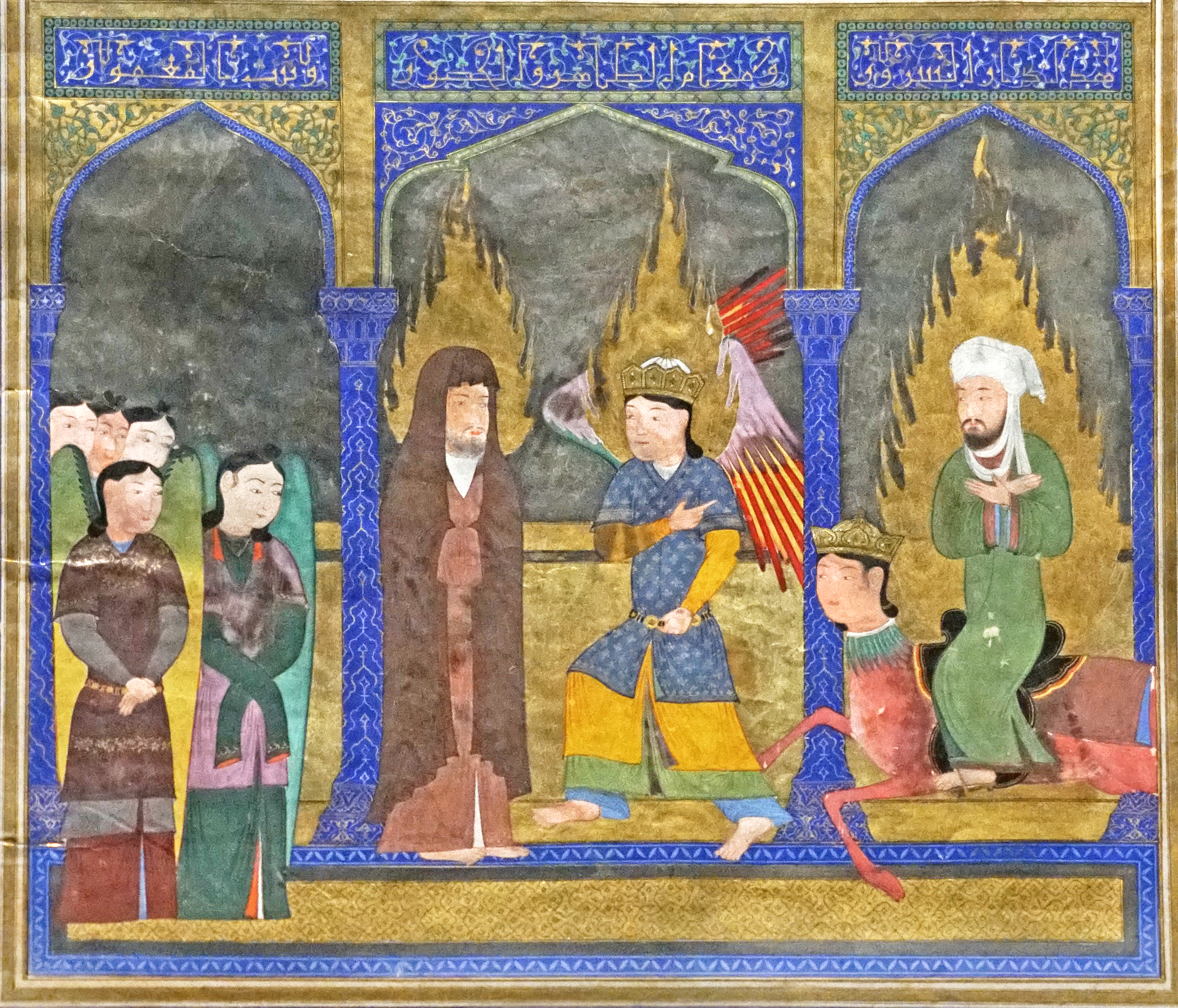
Jesus and Muhammad introduced by an angel in paradise. Timurid, 1466.

In Kitab al-Milal wa al-Nihal, al-Shahrastani (d. 1153), an influential Persian historian, historiographer, scholar, philosopher and theologian, records a portrayal of Jesus very close to the orthodox tenets while continuing the Islamic narrative:

The Christians. (They are) the community (umma) of the Christ, Jesus, son of Mary (peace upon him). He is who was truly sent (as prophet; mab'uth) after Moses (peace upon him), and who was announced in the Torah. To him were (granted) manifest signs and notable evidences, such as the reviving of the dead and the curing of the blind and the leper. His very nature and innate disposition (fitra) are a perfect sign of his truthfulness; that is, his coming without previous seed and his speaking without prior teaching. For all the (other) prophets the arrival of their revelation was at (the age of) forty years, but revelation came to him when he was made to speak in the cradle, and revelation came to him when he conveyed (the divine message) at (the age of) thirty. The duration of his (prophetic) mission (da'wa) was three years and three months and three days.

=== Shia Islam ===
In the Nahj al-Balagha, the fourth caliph Ali (r. 656–661) is reported to have talked about the simplicity of Jesus. Ali says that "Jesus used a stone for his pillow, put on coarse clothes and ate rough food. His condiment was hunger. His lamp at night was the moon. He had no wife to allure him, nor any son to give grief, neither wealth to deviate. His two feet were his conveyance and his two hands were his servant". According to Ja'far al-Sadiq, a great-great-grandson of Ali, the time between David and Jesus was four hundred years. Ja'far further says that the religion of Jesus was monotheism (tawḥīd) and purity (ikhlāṣ). The Injil (Gospel) was sent down to him and the pledge that other prophets took was also taken from Jesus: to establish prayer with religion, enjoin the good and forbid the evil, allowing what is allowed and forbidding what has been forbidden. Admonitions and parables were sent down to him in the Injil, but there was no law of retribution in it nor precepts of retribution (ahkam al-hudud), and no obligations for inheritance. He was sent what was an alleviation of what was sent down to Moses in the Torah. Jesus commanded of his followers that they believe in the law of the Torah and the Injil.

According to Qadi al-Nu'man, a famous Muslim jurist of the Fatimid period, Jesus is referred to as the Messiah (al-Masīḥ) in the Quran because he was sent to the people who responded to him in order to remove (masaha) their impurities, the ailments of their faith; whether apparent (zahir) or hidden (batin). Qadi al- Nu'man, in his work Foundation of Symbolic Interpretation (Asās al-ta'wīl), talks about the spiritual birth (milad al-batin) of Jesus, as an interpretation of his story of physical birth (milad al-zahir) mentioned in the Quran. He says that Mary, the mother of Jesus, is a metaphor for someone who nurtured and instructed Jesus (lāhiq), rather than physically giving birth to him. Qadi al-Nu'man explains that Jesus was from the pure progeny of Abraham, just as Ali and his sons were from the pure progeny of Muhammad, through Fatima.

=== Sufism ===
Early Sufis adopted the sayings of Jesus in the Sermon on the Mount and an ascetic dimension. The submission and sacrifice Jesus exemplified shows the Muslim is to be set apart from worldly compromises. In poetry and mysticism, Jesus was celebrated as a prophet close to the heart of God achieving an uncommon degree of self-denial.

Although the writings developed over the centuries embellished Jesus' miracles, the lessons of Jesus can be seen as metaphors of the inner life. These rich and diverse presentations of Jesus in Sufi traditions are the largest body of Jesus-texts in any non-Christian tradition.

A key issue arises for Muslims with the Sufi picture of Jesus: how universally should the ascetic/esoteric approach be applied? For many Muslim poets and scholars the answer is clear: every Muslim is invited to the path of asceticism and inner realization embodied by Jesus. However, whilst all Muslims revere Jesus, most have reservations about the application of his way of life to society. For Muslims the highest pinnacle of human achievement is, after all, Muhammad. Muhammad is revered in part because he promoted the right blend of justice and mercy. In other words, Muslims need both a path that addresses individual spirituality as well as a path that will address the complex issues of community life, law, justice, etc. Jesus is viewed by many Muslims as having lived out only one side of this equation. As a figure of the heart or individual conscience, Jesus is viewed by some to be a limited figure. In more critical Muslim perspectives the Sermon on the Mount is admired but seen as impractical for human society. Perhaps the greatest division amongst Muslims has to do with the relevance of ascetic and esoteric beliefs in the context of strengthening an Islamic society.

The miraculous birth and life of Jesus becomes a metaphor for Rumi of the spiritual rebirth that is possible within each human soul. This rebirth is not achieved without effort; one needs to practice silence, poverty, and fasting—themes that were prominent in Jesus' life according to Islamic traditions.

Ibn Arabi stated Jesus was Al-Insān al-Kāmil, the spirit and simultaneously a servant of God. Jesus is held to be "one with God" in whole coincidence of will, not as a being. Due to the spirit of God dwelling in Jesus, God spoke and acted through him. Yet Jesus is not considered to be God, but a person within God's word and spirit and a manifestation of God's attributes, like a mirror, a view resembling Nestorian traditions.

The conception of Jesus as described by Ibn Arabi (d. 1240), an Andalusian scholar, Sufi mystic, poet and philosopher, in the Bezels of Wisdom:

From the water of Mary or from the breath of Gabriel,
In the form of a mortal fashioned of clay,
The Spirit came into existence in an essence
Purged of Nature's taint, which is called Sijjin (prison)
Because of this, his sojourn was prolonged,
Enduring, by decree, more than a thousand years.
A spirit from none other than God,
So that he might raise the dead and bring forth birds from clay.

==== Ascetic literature ====
Jesus is widely venerated in Muslim ascetic and mystic literature, such as in Muslim mystic Al-Ghazali's Ihya ʿulum ad-Din ('The revival of the religious sciences'). These works lay stress upon Jesus' poverty, his preoccupation with worship, his detachment from worldly life and his miracles. Such depictions also include advice and sermons which are attributed to him. Later Sufic adapted material from Christian gospels which were consistent with their ascetic portrayal. Sufi philosopher Ibn Arabi described Jesus as "the seal of universal holiness" due to the quality of his faith and "because he holds in his hands the keys of living breath and because he is at present in a state of deprivation and journeying".

== Ahmadiyya literature ==
The Ahmadiyya movement considers Jesus was a prophet and a mortal man, who was crucified and remained on the cross for six hours, until darkness fell. Jesus was taken down from the cross alive and unconscious. He was treated for three days and nights by saint physician Necdemus in a cave like tomb (especially built for Joseph of Arimathea). Thereafter, Jesus recuperated from his wounds, met his trusted disciples on the Mount of Olives, and left Judea towards the sea of Galilee on his way to Damascus. After his dramatic escape from crucifixion, Jesus traveled to the eastern lands in search of the ten lost tribes of Israel. Finally, he died a natural death in Kashmir, India, as opposed to having been raised up alive to Heaven.

== Appearance ==
Based upon several Hadith narrations of Muhammad, Jesus can be physically described thus (with any differences in Jesus' physical description being due to Muhammad describing him when seeing him at different occasions, such as during his ascension to Heaven, or when describing Jesus during Jesus' second coming):

- A well-built man of medium/moderate/average height and stature with a broad chest.
- Straight, lank, long hair that fell between his shoulders. It seems as though water is dribbling from his head, though it is not wet.
- A moderate complexion.

== See also ==
- Biblical and Quranic narratives
- Christianity and Islam
- Islamic eschatology
- Izhar ul-Haqq
- List of legends in the Quran
- Mary in Islam
- Peace in Islamic philosophy
- Qisas Al-Anbiya
- Saint Mary (film)
- The Messiah (2007 film)
- Glossary of Islam
- Outline of Islam
- Index of Islam-related articles
