= Scott Davison =

Scott Davison may refer to:

- Scott Davison (baseball player)
- Scott A. Davison, American philosopher
