= Christ (title) =

Title meaning "anointed"

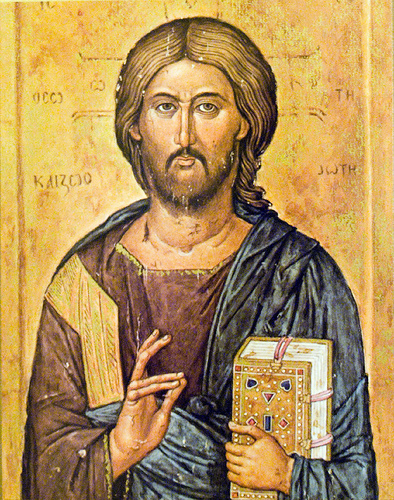
Icon of Christ Pantocrator from Macedonia, 14th century

Christ, (Note: Pronounced /kraɪst/ KRYST. From Latin: Christus; from Ancient Greek: χριστός, romanized: khristós, lit. 'anointed, covered in oil'; a semantic loan of Imperial Aramaic: משיחא, romanized: məšīḥā or Hebrew: מָשִׁיחַ, romanized: māšîaḥ, lit. 'messiah'; from Imperial Aramaic: משח, romanized: məšaḥ or Hebrew: מָשַׁח, romanized: māšaḥ, lit. 'to anoint'. Alternatively (Messiah or Messias): Latin: messias, from Ancient Greek: μεσσίας, romanized: messías (alternative to χριστός), from the same Semitic word.) used by Christians as both a name and a title, unambiguously refers to Jesus. As a title it is used both in the reciprocal form "Christ Jesus", meaning "the Messiah Jesus" (or "Jesus the Khristós"; lit. "Jesus the Anointed"), and independently as "the Christ". The earliest texts of the New Testament, the Pauline epistles, often refer to Jesus as "Christ Jesus", or simply "Christ".

The concept of the Christ in Christianity originated from the concept of the messiah in Judaism. Christians believe that Jesus is the messiah foretold in the Hebrew Bible and the Christian Old Testament. Although the conceptions of the messiah in each religion are similar, for the most part they are distinct from one another due to the split of early Christianity and Judaism in the 1st century.

Although the original followers of Jesus believed Jesus to be the Jewish messiah, e.g. in the Confession of Peter, he was usually called "Jesus of Nazareth" or "Jesus, son of Joseph". He came to be known by the name "Jesus Christ" among Christians, who believe that his crucifixion and resurrection fulfill the messianic prophecies of the Old Testament, especially the prophecies outlined in Isaiah 53 and Psalm 22.

== Etymology ==
Christ derives from the Greek word χριστός (chrīstós), meaning "anointed one". The word is derived from the Greek verb χρίω (chrī́ō), meaning "to anoint." In the Greek Septuagint, χριστός was a semantic loan used to translate the Hebrew מָשִׁיחַ (Mašíaḥ, messiah), meaning "[one who is] anointed".

== Usage ==
The word Christ (and similar spellings) appears in English and in most European languages. English speakers now often use "Christ" as if it were a name, one part of the name "Jesus Christ", though it was originally a title. Its reciprocal usage in "Christ Jesus" emphasizes its nature as a title. Compare the usage "the Christ".

The spelling Christ in English became standardized in the 18th century, when, in the spirit of the Enlightenment, certain words' spelling changed to fit their Greek or Latin origins. Before that, scribes writing in Old and Middle English usually used the spelling Crist—the i being pronounced either as /iː/, preserved in the names of churches such as St Katherine Cree, or as a short /ɪ/, preserved in the modern pronunciation of "Christmas". The spelling "Christ" in English is attested from the 14th century.

In modern and ancient usage, even in secular terminology, "Christ" usually refers to Jesus, based on the centuries-old tradition of such usage. Since the Apostolic Age, the use of the definite article before the word Christ and its gradual development into a proper name show the Christians identified the bearer with the promised messiah of the Jews.

== Background and New Testament references ==
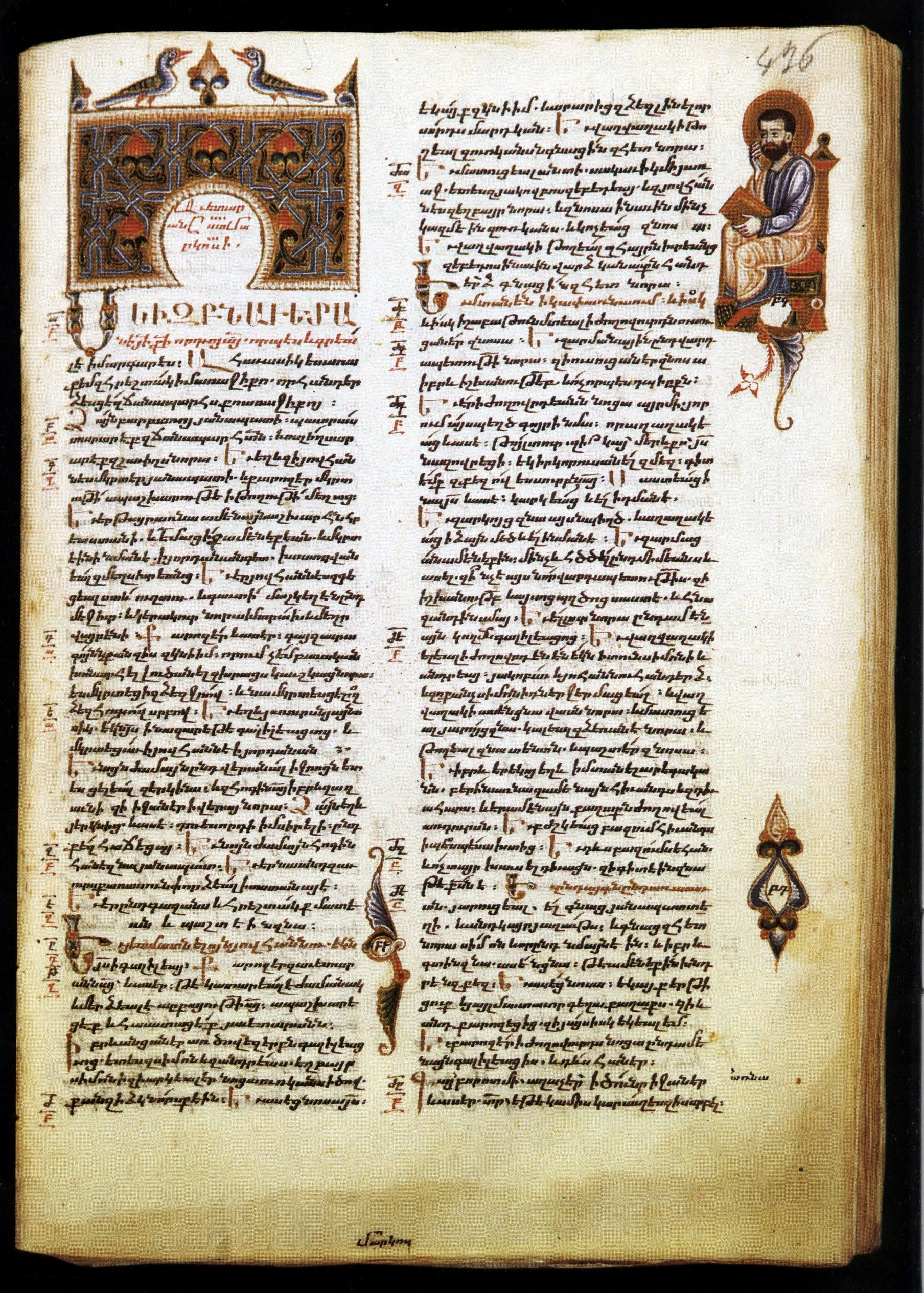
First page of Mark, by Sargis Pitsak (14th century): "The beginning of the gospel of Jesus Christ, the Son of God"

=== Pre-New-Testament references ===
In the Old Testament, anointing was a ceremonial ritual reserved to:

- the Kings of Israel (1 Kings 19:16, Psalms 17 (18):51);
- Cyrus the Great (Isaiah 45:1);
- the High Priest of Israel;
- the patriarchs (Psalms 104 (105):15); and
- the prophets.

In the Septuagint text of the deuterocanonical books, the term "Christ" (Χριστός, translit. Christós) is found in 2 Maccabees 1:10 (referring to the anointed High Priest of Israel) and in the Book of Sirach 46:19, in relation to Samuel, prophet and institutor of the kingdom under Saul.

At the time of Jesus, there was no single form of Second Temple Judaism, and there were significant political, social, and religious differences among the various Jewish groups. But for centuries the Jews had used the term moshiach ("anointed") to refer to their expected deliverer.

=== Opening lines of Mark and Matthew ===
Mark 1:1 ("The beginning of the gospel of Jesus Christ, the Son of God") identifies Jesus as both Christ and the Son of God. Matthew 1:1 uses Christ as a name and Matthew 1:16 explains it again with: "Jesus, who is called Christ". The use of the definite article before the word "Christ" and its gradual development into a proper name show that the Christians identified Jesus with the promised messiah of the Jews who fulfilled all the messianic predictions in a fuller and a higher sense than had been given them by the rabbis.

=== Confession of Peter (Matthew, Mark and Luke) ===
The so-called Confession of Peter, recorded in the Synoptic Gospels as Jesus's foremost apostle Peter saying that Jesus was the Messiah, has become a famous proclamation of faith among Christians since the first century.

=== Martha's statement (John) ===
In John 11:27 Martha told Jesus, "you are the Christ, the Son of God, who is coming into the world", signifying that both titles were generally accepted (yet considered distinct) among the followers of Jesus before the raising of Lazarus.

=== Sanhedrin trial of Jesus (Matthew, Mark and Luke) ===
During the Sanhedrin trial of Jesus, it might appear from the narrative of Matthew that Jesus at first refused a direct reply to the high priest Caiaphas's question: "Are you the Messiah, the Son of God?", where his answer is given merely as Σὺ εἶπας (Su eipas, "You [singular] have said it"). Similarly but differently in Luke, all those present are said to ask Jesus: 'Are you then the Son of God?', to which Jesus reportedly answered: Ὑμεῖς λέγετε ὅτι ἐγώ εἰμι (Hymeis legete hoti ego eimi, "You [plural] say that I am". In the Gospel of Mark, however, when asked by Caiaphas 'Are you the Messiah, the Son of the Blessed One?', Jesus tells the Sanhedrin: Ἐγώ εἰμι (ego eimi, "I am"). There are instances from Jewish literature in which the expression "you have said it" is equivalent to "you are right". The Messianic claim was less significant than the claim to divinity, which caused the high priest's horrified accusation of blasphemy and the subsequent call for the death sentence. Before Pilate, on the other hand, it was merely the assertion of his royal dignity which gave grounds for his condemnation.

=== Pauline epistles ===
The word "Christ" is closely associated with Jesus in the Pauline epistles, which suggests that there was no need for the early Christians to claim that Jesus is Christ because it was considered widely accepted among them. Hence Paul can use the term Khristós with no confusion as to whom it refers, and he can use expressions such as "in Christ" to refer to the followers of Jesus, as in 1 Corinthians 4:15 and Romans 12:5. Paul proclaimed him as the Last Adam, who restored through obedience what Adam lost through disobedience. The Pauline epistles are a source of some key Christological connections; e.g., Ephesians 3:17–19 relates the love of Christ to the knowledge of Christ, and considers the love of Christ as a necessity for knowing him.

There are also implicit claims to him being the Christ in the words and actions of Jesus.

=== Use of Messias in John ===
The Hellenization Μεσσίας (Messías) is used twice to mean "Messiah" in the New Testament: by the disciple Andrew at John 1:41, and by the Samaritan woman at the well at John 4:25. In both cases, the Greek text specifies immediately after that this means "the Christ."

== Christology ==
Christology, literally "the understanding of Christ", is the study of the nature (person) and work (role in salvation) of Jesus in Christianity. It studies Jesus Christ's humanity and divinity, and the relation between these two aspects; and the role he plays in salvation.

From the second to the fifth centuries, the relation of the human and divine nature of Christ was a major focus of debates in the early church and at the first seven ecumenical councils. The Council of Chalcedon in 451 issued a formulation of the hypostatic union of the two natures of Christ, one human and one divine, "united with neither confusion nor division". Most of the major branches of Western Christianity and Eastern Orthodoxy subscribe to this formulation, while many branches of Oriental Orthodox Churches reject it, subscribing to miaphysitism.

According to the Summa Theologica of Thomas Aquinas, in the singular case of Jesus, the word Christ has a twofold meaning, which stands for "both the Godhead anointing and the manhood anointed". It derives from the twofold human-divine nature of Christ (dyophysitism): the Son of man is anointed in consequence of His incarnated flesh, as well as the Son of God is anointing in consequence of the "Godhead which He has with the Father" (ST III, q. 16, a. 5).

== Symbols ==
The Chi Rho

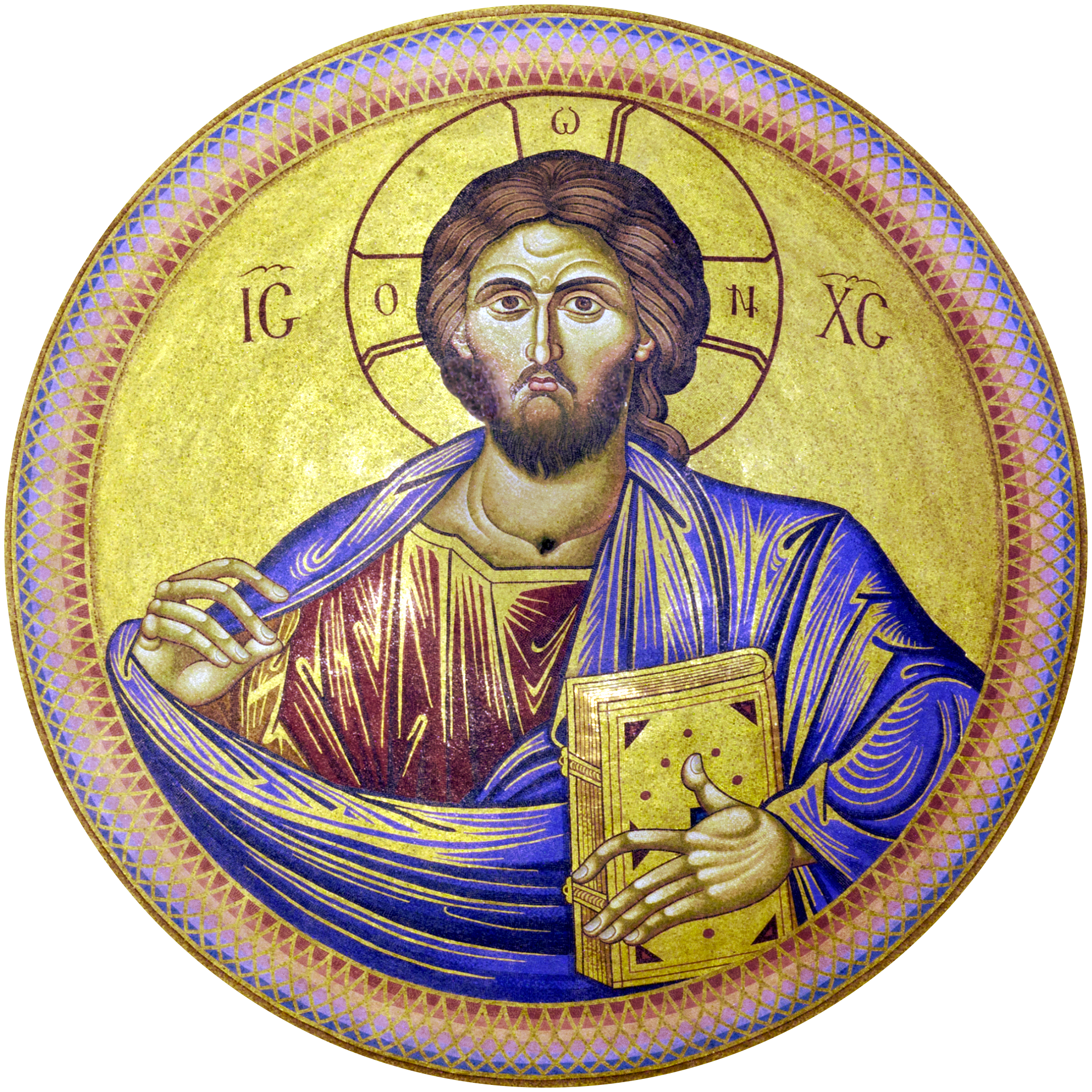
Christ Pantocrator mosaic, Church of the Holy Sepulchre, showing use of ΧϹ digraph

The use of "Χ" as an abbreviation for "Christ" derives from the Greek letter Chi (χ), in the word Christós (Ancient Greek: Χριστός, romanized: khristós, lit. 'anointed, covered in oil'). An early Christogram is the Chi Rho symbol, formed by superimposing the first two Greek letters in Christ, chi (Χ) and rho (Ρ), to produce ☧.

The centuries-old English word Χmas (or, in earlier form, XPmas) is an English form of χ-mas, itself an abbreviation for Christ-mas. The Oxford English Dictionary (OED) and the OED Supplement have cited usages of "X-" or "Xp-" for "Christ-" as early as 1485. The terms "Xpian" and "Xren" have been used for "Christian", "Xst" for "Christ's" "Xρofer" for (Saint) Christopher and Xmas, Xstmas, and Xtmas for Christmas. The OED further cites usage of "Xtianity" for "Christianity" from 1634. (Note: Viz. 1485 Rolls of Parliament VI.280/I The most famous, beloved, and Xren Prince. 1573 Baret Alv. s.v. V. "The long mistaking of this woorde Xps standing for Chrs by abbreuiation which fore lacke of knowledge in the greeke they tooke for x, p, and s, and so likewise Xpofer. 1598 Rowlands Betraying of Christ Hunter, Cl. 25 "Xpian the outward, the inward not at all"; 1634 Documents against Prynne, Camden, 33 "Such right...as your Xtianity, place, and function joyntly require." 1697 Aubrey Lives Milton (MS Aubrey 8, lf. 63) "He was so faire, that they called him the lady of Xts college.") According to Merriam-Webster's Dictionary of English Usage, most of the evidence for these words comes from "educated Englishmen who knew their Greek".

The December 1957 News and Views published by the Church League of America, a conservative organization founded in 1937, attacked the use of "Xmas" in an article titled "X=The Unknown Quantity". Gerald L. K. Smith picked up the statements later, in December 1966, saying that Xmas was a "blasphemous omission of the name of Christ" and that "'X' is referred to as being symbolical of the unknown quantity." More recently, American evangelist Franklin Graham and former CNN contributor Roland S. Martin publicly raised concerns. Graham stated in an interview that the use of "Xmas" is taking "Christ out of Christmas" and called it a "war against the name of Jesus Christ." Roland Martin relates the use of "Xmas" to his growing concerns of increasing commercialization and secularization of what he says is one of Christianity's highest holy days.

== See also ==
- Chrism
- Ichthys
- Dyophysitism
- Hypostatic union
- Kerigma
- Knowledge of Christ
- Masih
- Names and titles of Jesus in the Quran
- Perfection of Christ
- You are Christ
- Redeemer (Christianity)
