= Sajjad H. Rizvi =

Intellectual historian

Sajjad Hayder Rizvi is an intellectual historian and professor of Islamic intellectual history and Islamic studies at the University of Exeter.

== Biography ==
Rizvi completed his BA and MA in modern history, as well as his MPhil in modern middle East studies from the University of Oxford. He received his PhD in Oriental studies from the University of Cambridge.

Rizvi worked as a lecturer at the University of Bristol before moving to the University of Exeter, where he is now a professor of Islamic intellectual history.

== Works ==
- Mulla Sadra and Metaphysics: Modulation of Being
- Mullā Ṣadrā Shīrāzī: His Life and Works and the Sources for Safavid Philosophy

== See also ==
- Mohammed Rustom
- Suleiman Ali Mourad
- Irfan A. Omar
