= Masih (title) =

Title of Jesus in the Quran

al-Masīḥ (Arabic: المسيح) is an Arabic rendition of the Hebrew title Māshīaḥ (מָשִׁיחַ, 'Messiah') or the Greek title Khristós (Χριστός, 'Christ'), meaning "the anointed one". It is derived from the Arabic root msḥ, meaning 'to rub, wipe, anoint'. It is the common word used by Arab Christians for 'Christ', a usage which was adopted by both Christians and Muslims in a number of languages influenced by Arabic.

It also occurs eleven times in the Quran as a title for Jesus (ʿĪsā), both followed by his proper name as "the Messiah/Christ Jesus the Son of Mary" (three times) or "the Messiah/Christ the Son of Mary" (five times) and independently as "the Messiah/Christ" (three times). The title was interpreted in many different ways by Muslim exegetes, all of which tended to downplay the connection of the word to Jesus' central role in Christianity as the savior-God.

== Historical background ==
It was a common practice in the ancient Near East to confer kingship to new rulers by anointing them, rather than by crowning them. It is in this context that the Hebrew term Māshīaḥ (Messiah, meaning "anointed") was originally used, referring to an eschatological figure who was expected to rise from the royal line of David and who would rule like a divine king, being God's 'anointed one'. Among Christians, Jesus was believed to fulfill this role of Messiah, and the authors of the New Testament generally referred to Jesus as Iēsous Khristos ("Jesus Christ" or "Jesus the Messiah") or as Khristos Iēsous ("the Christ Jesus" or "the Messiah Jesus").

== In the Quran ==
In the Quran, however, the original meaning of the word masīḥ as "anointed" seems to play no role of significance, and the term appears to have simply become a title commonly affixed to Jesus' name, not unlike the usage of the word 'Christ' in English. Although many interpreters of the Quran did recognize the Arabic word masīḥ (derived from masaḥa, 'to wipe', 'to touch', 'to stroke', 'to anoint') as meaning "anointed", they did not connect the concept of being anointed with a Davidic messianic figure.

Many interpretations of the word existed. The Arabic lexicographer Fairuzabadi (1329–1414) listed no less than 49 different meanings for the title al-Masīḥ as elaborated by Quranic exegetes. Most exegetes (correctly) understood the word to be equivalent to the passive participle of the root m-s-ḥ, meaning 'wiped', 'touched', 'anointed'. Interpretations based on this derivation included that Jesus had been 'touched' by the wing of the archangel Gabriel at birth in order to safeguard him from Satan, that he had been 'anointed' with oil (as all the prophets in Islamic tradition), or that he had been 'anointed' with the blessing (Arabic: Baraka) of God.

Other interpretations took the word to be an active form of the root m-s-ḥ, meaning 'wiping', 'touching', etc. This interpretation was often connected to the idea of Jesus as healing the sick by 'touching' them, or because he purified believers by 'wiping' away their sins. This latter interpretation, which among others was given by the Ismaili jurist al-Qāḍī al-Nu‘mān (died 974), was often criticized because it violates the principle found throughout the Quran that every believer is responsible for their own virtues and sins, and that only God can forgive sin.

Finally, some interpreters of the Quran took the word masīḥ to be derived not from the root m-s-ḥ, but rather from the root s-y-ḥ, meaning 'to travel', believing Jesus to have received this title because of his itinerant lifestyle.

== See also ==
- Christ (title)
- Christianity in the Middle East
- Islamic messianism
- Jesus
- Jesus in Islam
- Mahdi, another eschatological messianic figure in Islam
- Messiah in Islam

== Works cited ==
- Rippin, Andrew (2005). "Anointing". In McAuliffe, Jane Dammen (ed.). Encyclopaedia of the Qurʾān. Brill. doi:10.1163/1875-3922_q3_EQSIM_00021.
- Robinson, Neal (2005). "Jesus". In McAuliffe, Jane Dammen (ed.). Encyclopaedia of the Qurʾān. Brill. doi:10.1163/1875-3922_q3_EQCOM_00099.
- Virani, Shafique N. (2019). "Hierohistory in Qāḍī l-Nuʿmān's Foundation of Symbolic Interpretation (Asās al-Taʾwīl): The Birth of Jesus". In Massoud, Sami G. (ed.). Studies in Islamic Historiography: Essays in Honour of Professor Donald P. Little. Leiden: Brill. pp. 147–169. doi:10.1163/9789004415294_007. ISBN 978-90-04-41529-4.
