= Name of Christ =

Name of Christ may refer to:

- Names and titles of Jesus in the New Testament
- Names and titles of Jesus in the Quran
- Holy Name of Jesus, refers to the theological and devotional use of the name of Jesus
- Feast of the Name of Christ in the Lutheran church
