= Scott A. Davison =

American philosopher (born 1965)

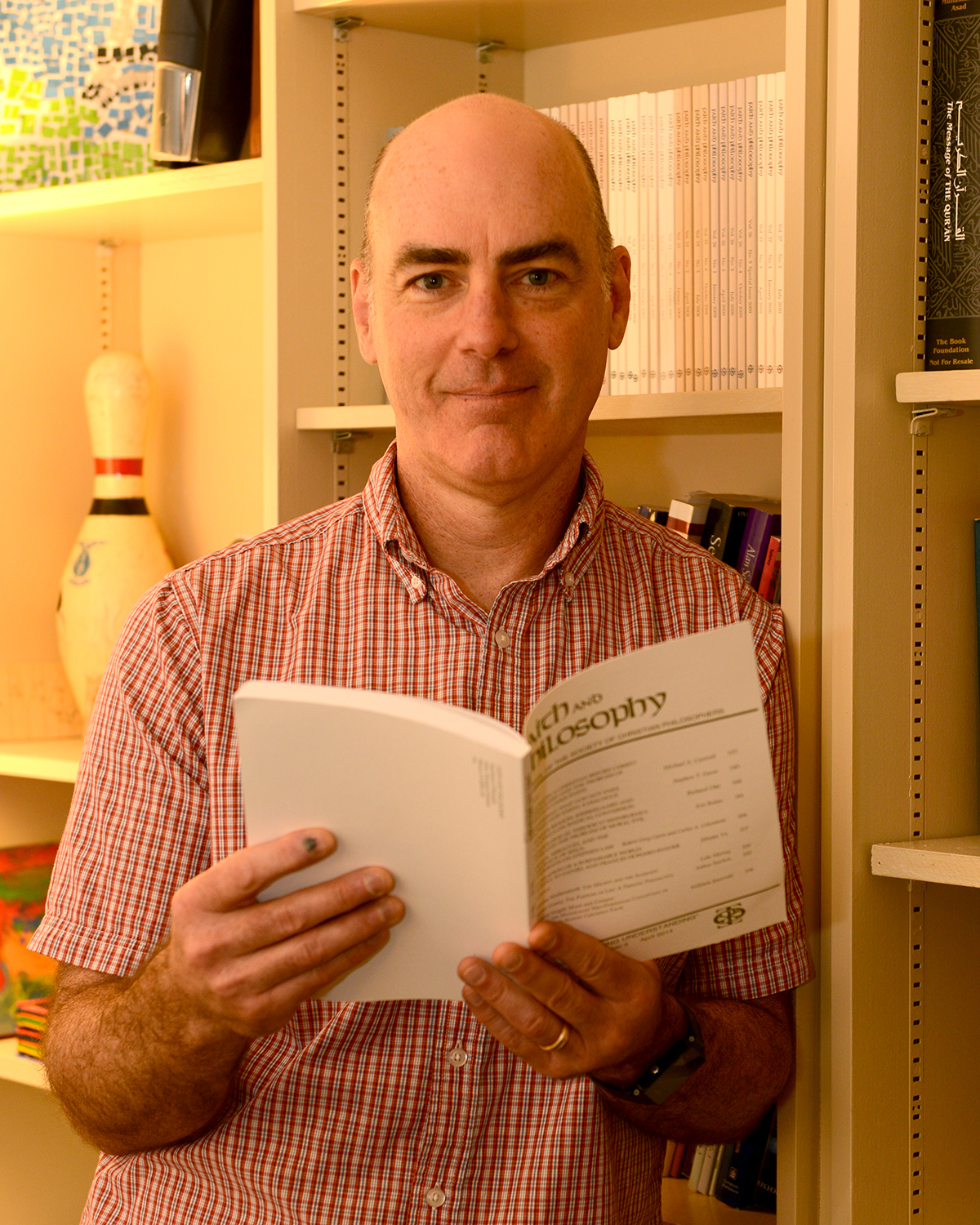
- Born: 1965 (age 60–61)

Philosophical work
- Era: 21st-century philosophy
- Region: Western philosophy
- Institutions: Morehead State University

Scott A. Davison (born 1965) is an American philosopher and Professor of Philosophy Emeritus at Morehead State University, known for his work on philosophy of religion. He will become the editor of the International Journal for Philosophy of Religion in 2026 and is past president of the Society for Philosophy of Religion. He is currently a research fellow at the Center for Philosophy of Religion at the University of Notre Dame.

== Books ==
- On the Intrinsic Value of Everything (Continuum Press, 2012)
- Petitionary Prayer: A Philosophical Investigation (Oxford Press, 2017)
- God and Prayer (Cambridge Elements Series, 2022)
- The Protests of Job: An Interfaith Dialogue (Palgrave MacMillan, 2022, with Sajjad Rizvi and Shira Weiss)
