= Irfan A. Omar =

Islamic studies scholar

Irfan A. Omar is an Islamic studies scholar and professor of systematic theology at Marquette University, Milwaukee, United States.

== Works ==
As author

- El-Khaḍir/El-Khiḍr: Le Prophète-Sage dans la tradition Musulmane (2021)
- The Prophet al-Khidr: Between the Qur'anic Text and Islamic Contexts (2022)

As editor

- Interfaith Engagement in Milwaukee: A Brief History of Christian—Muslim Dialogue (2020) with Kaitlyn C. Daly
- Peacemaking and the Challenge of Violence in World Religions (2015) with Michael Duffey
- The Judeo-Christian-Islamic Heritage: Philosophical and Theological Perspectives (2012) with Richard C. Taylor
- A Muslim view of Christianity: Essays on Dialogue by Mahmoud Ayoub (2010)
