= John Baret =

English lexicographer

John Baret or Barrett (died 1580), was an English lexicographer during the Elizabethan era, and was responsible for publishing a dictionary of English, Latin, Greek and French entitled An Alvearie.

== Life ==
Baret matriculated at St John's College, Cambridge in 1551 as a sizar before migrating to Trinity College, Cambridge and receiving a degree of B.A. in 1554–5, and an M.A. in 1558. He became a fellow of the college in 1560. He later received the degree of M.D. from Peterhouse, Cambridge in 1577, but there is no evidence that he ever practised medicine.

About 1555 he describes himself as "having pupils at Cambridge, studious of the Latin tongue."

In later years he is said to have travelled abroad, and to have taught in London. Baret died before the close of 1580, but the exact date is uncertain.

== Dictionary ==
Baret published, in about 1574, a dictionary of the English, Latin, and French languages, with occasional illustrations from the Greek. It was called An Alvearie, or Triple Dictionarie in English, Latin, and French, and was dedicated to William Cecil, Lord Burghley, the chancellor of Cambridge University. The date, 2 Feb 1573–4, appears among the introductory pages, but not on the title-page. The materials for the volume were gradually collected during eighteen years by Baret's many pupils, and he entitled it, on that account, an "Alvearie", or beehive. Every English word is first explained, and its equivalent given in Latin and French. Two indexes at the end of the volume collect the Latin and French words occurring in the text.

The expenses of publication were mainly borne by Sir Thomas Smith, "principall secretarie to the queenes majestie," and Alexander Nowell, "Maister Nowell, deane of Pawles". Latin, Greek, and English verses in praise of the compiler and his work were prefixed to the book, among the writers being Richard Mulcaster and Arthur Golding. A second edition of the dictionary, in which Greek took almost as important a place as the other languages, was published shortly after Baret's death, and bore the date 2 January 1580–1. A lengthy poem "to the reader," signed "Tho. M.", laments the recent death of the author, and new Latin elegiacs are added by Mulcaster. The title of the book in its final form runs: An Alvearie, or quadruple Dictionarie containing foure sundrie tongues, namely, English, Latine, Greeke, and Frenche, newlie enriched with varietie of wordes, phrases, proverbs, and divers lightsome observations of Grammar. Baret's dictionary is still of great service in enabling readers to trace the meaning of Elizabethan words and phrases that are now obsolete.
