= Suleiman Ali Mourad =

Lebanese religious studies scholar

Suleiman Ali Mourad is a Lebanese religious studies scholar and a scholar of Quranic studies. He is Myra M. Sampson Professor of Religion and Middle East Studies and the chair of Department of Religion at Smith College. His work explores Islamic history, religious thought, Jerusalem, Jihad ideology, and how modernity has transformed Muslims' views on their history, legal traditions, and intellectual heritage.

In 2025, he was awarded a Senior Fellowship of the Zukunftskollegs at the University of Konstanz.

== Works ==
As author

- Ibn Asakir of Damascus: Champion of Sunni Islam at the Time of the Crusades (Oneworld, 2021)
- The Mosaic of Islam: A Conversation with Perry Anderson (Verso, 2016)
- The Intensification and Reorientation of Sunni Jihad Ideology in the Crusader Period (2015) with James Lindsay
- Early Islam Between Myth and History: Al-Hasan al-Basri (d. 110H/728CE) and the Formation of His Legacy in Classical Islamic Scholarship (2006)

As editor

- Muslim Sources of the Crusader Period: An Anthology (2021) with James E. Lindsay
- Routledge Handbook on Jerusalem (Routledge, 2019) with Naomi Koltun-Fromm and Bedross Der Matossian
- In the House of Understanding: Histories in Memory of Kamal Salibi (2017) with Abdulrahim Abu-Husayn and Tarif Khalidi
- Jerusalem: Idea and Reality (2008) with Tamar Mayer
