= Names and titles of Jesus in the Quran =

There are a variety of titles used to refer to the penultimate prophet of Islam, Isa ibn Maryam (Jesus), in the Quran. Islamic scholars emphasize the need for Muslims to follow the name of Isa (Jesus), whether spoken or written, with the honorific phrase alayhi al-salām (Arabic: عليه السلام), which means peace be upon him. Isa is mentioned by name or title 78 times in the Quran.

== Names ==
=== Masih ===
Isa is the Messiah in Islam and is the called Īsā al-Masīḥ by Muslims. It is one of several titles of Isa, who is referred to as Masih or Al-Masih 11 times in the Quran. (Note: Messiah or Al Masih: Quran 3:45, 4:171-172, 5:17, 5:72-75, 9:30-31) It means 'the anointed', 'the traveller', or 'one who cures by caressing'.

== Titles ==
=== Spirit from God ===
In Quran 4:171, Isa is called Rūḥ minhu (Arabic: رُوحٌۭ مِّنْه), meaning 'a Spirit from him' (i.e., from God). The word rūḥ originally meant "breath", "wind". In post-Quranic tradition, rūḥ became equated with nafs, "spirit", but in the Quran itself, it means "a special angel messenger and a special divine quality". In three passages (2:87, 2:253; 5:110), Isa is also said to be supported by the Rūḥ al-qudus ("the holy spirit" or "spirit of holiness").

=== Pure Boy ===
According to the Quran and Hadith, Isa is called a pure boy (Arabic: غُلَٰمًا زَكِيًّا, romanized: ġulammā zakīyā).

=== Word of God ===
Isa is called Kalima (Word) or Kalimat Allah (Word of God) twice in the Quran. The concept of Logos also appears in the Targums (Aramaic translations of the Hebrew Bible dating to the first centuries AD), where the term Memra (Aramaic for "The Word") is often used instead of 'The Lord', especially when referring to a manifestation of God that could be construed as anthropomorphic. (Note: Kalima or Kalimat Allah: Quran 3:39, 3:45, 3:48, 4:171, 5:46, 5:110)In light of Islam, the miraculous birth of Jesus through God's Will despite being fatherless is likened to the creation of Adam without a father or mother as stated in the third chapter of the Qur'an, verse 59. This title is never used to refer Adam Jesus is called His Word and the text interestingly makes an ontological personification in 3:45, by two means. The first one is using the same structure it does for other Annunciations, in 19:7 and 3:39, which is Subject + "gives glad tidings" (تَبْشِير) + the person that is going to be born. Interestingly, the word used is بِكَلِمَةٍ. The second mean is by shifting the grammar, from the feminine noun in the structure كَلِمَةٍ مِنْهُ, meaning "Word from Him"(from Allah), to the masculine pronoun meaning in the structure "اسْمُهُ", meaning his name, which forces the "Word from Him" to be not a impersonal command, but a person in the text, having a name, the Messiah, Jesus.

The Quran states:"O People of the Book! Do not go to extremes regarding your faith; say nothing about Allah except the truth. The Messiah, Jesus, son of Mary, was no more than a messenger of Allah and His Word cast towards Mary and a spirit ˹created by a command˺ from Him. So believe in Allah and His messengers and do not say, 'Three' [Gods - forming an antithesis with "Allah is One God" that follow in text] Stop!—for your own good. Allah is only One God. Glory be to Him! He is far above having a son! To Him belongs whatever is in the heavens and whatever is on the earth. And Allah is sufficient as a Trustee of Affairs."5:110

=== Sign ===
In Islam, Isa's return is one of the ten major signs of Day of Resurrection. In the Quran, Isa is four times called an Āyah (Arabic: آيَة, lit. 'sign', also used to designate a verse of the Quran). (Note: Sign: Quran 19:21, 21:91, 23:50, 43:61)

=== Wajih ===
In Surat al-Imran verse 3:45, Isa is called wajīḥ (وَجِيه, 'honourable' or 'distinguished'), a title also used for Musa (Moses) in Surat al-Ahzab 33:69. Many Muslims refer to Isa as Īsā al-Wajīḥ, since he is an honoured Prophet in Islam.
