= Numerology (disambiguation) =

Numerology is the mystical belief about numbers.

It may also refer to:

- Numerology (Ismailism), a religious belief
- Numerology (wireless), a concept in wireless communication
