= Aaron in Islam =

Aaron in the Islamic faith

Prophet Hārūn Alayhi as-Salam
- هارون; Aaron
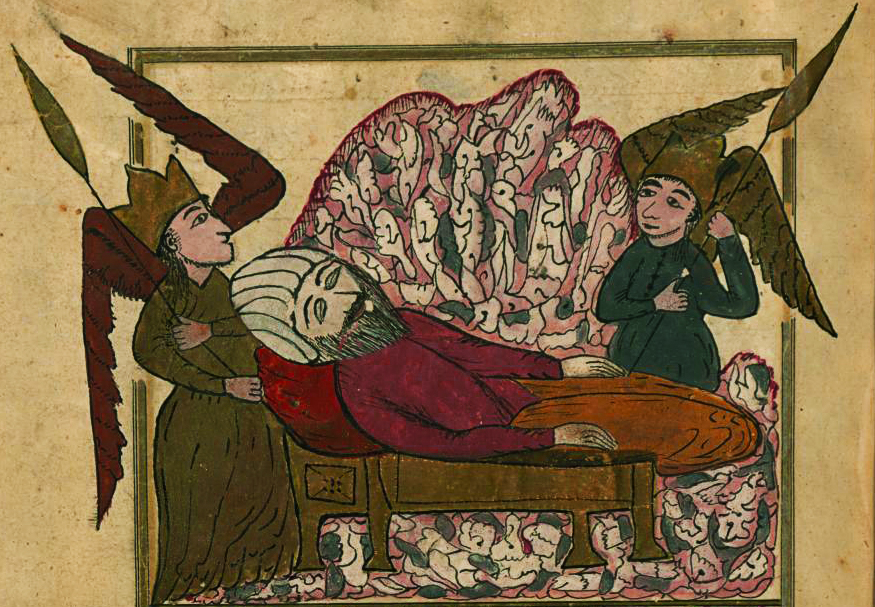
- Harun sleeping next to two angels.

Prophet of Islam
- Preceded by: Mūsā
- Succeeded by: Kālib

Personal life
- Born: Harun ibn Imran Egypt
- Died: Jordan
- Parents: ‘Imrān (father); Yūkābid (mother)
- Relatives: Mūsā (brother); Miriam (sister)

Religious life
- Religion: Islam

In Islam, Hārūn ibn ʿImrān (Arabic: هارون إبن عمران, lit. 'Aaron, son of Amram'), the Biblical Aaron, is a prophet and messenger of God, and the older brother of the prophet Mūsā (Moses). He along with his brother (Moses) preached to the Israelites during the Exodus.

== Quranic account ==
The Quran contains numerous references to Aaron, both by name and without name. It says that he was a descendant of Ibrāhīm (Abraham) and makes it clear that both he and Moses were sent together to warn the Pharaoh about God's punishment. It further adds that Moses had earlier prayed to God to strengthen his own ministry with Aaron and that Aaron helped Moses as he too was a prophet, and very eloquent in matters of speech and discourse. The Quran adds that both Moses and Aaron were entrusted to establish places of dwelling for the Israelites in Egypt, and to convert those houses into places of worship for God.

The incident of the Golden Calf as it is narrated in the Quran paints Aaron in a positive light. The Quran says that Aaron was entrusted the leadership of Israel while Moses was up on Ṭūr Sīnāʼ (Mount Sinai) for a period of forty days. It adds that Aaron tried his best to stop the worship of the Golden Calf, which was built not by Aaron but by a wicked man called the Samiri'.Quran 20:85–95 When Moses returned from Mount Sinai, he rebuked Aaron for allowing the worship of the idol, to which Aaron pleaded with Moses to not blame him when he had no role in its construction. The Quran then adds that Moses here lamented the sins of Israel, and said that he only had power over himself and Aaron.

Aaron is later commemorated in the Quran as one who had a "clear authority" and one who was "guided to the Right Path". It further adds that Aaron's memory was left for people who came after him and he is blessed by God along with his brother The Quran also says that people called ‘Isa's mother Maryam (Arabic: مريم, Mary) a "sister of Harun" Muslim scholars debated as to who exactly this "Harun" was in terms of his historical persona, with some saying that it was a reference to Aaron of the Exodus, and the term "sister" designating only a metaphorical or spiritual link between the two figures, all the more evident when Mary was a descendant of the priestly lineage of Aaron, while others held it to be another righteous man living at the time of Christ by the name of "Aaron". Most scholars have agreed to the former perspective, and have linked Mary spiritually with the actual sister of Aaron, her namesake Miriam (Arabic: مريم, Hebrew: מִרְיָם), whom she resembled in many ways. The Quran also narrates that, centuries later, when the Tabut (Arabic: تابـوت, Ark of the Covenant) returned to Israel, it contained "relics from the family of Moses and relics from the family of Aaron".

== Aaron in Muhammad's time ==
Muhammad speaks of Aaron in many of his sayings. In the event of the Mi'raj, his miraculous ascension through the Heavens, Muhammad is said to have encountered Aaron in the fifth heaven. According to old scholars, including Ibn Hisham, Muhammad, in particular, mentioned the beauty of Aaron when he encountered him in Heaven. Martin Lings, in his biographical Muhammad, speaks of Muhammad's wonderment at seeing fellow prophets in their heavenly glory:

Of Joseph he said that his face had the splendour of the moon at its full, and that he had been endowed with no less than the half of all existing beauty. Yet this did not diminish Muhammad's wonderment at his brethren, and he mentioned in particular the great beauty of Aaron.

Aaron was also mentioned by Muhammad in likeness to ‘Ali. Muhammad had left ‘Ali to look after his family, but the hypocrites of the time begun to spread the rumor that the prophet found ‘Ali a burden and was relieved to be rid of his presence. ‘Ali, grieved at hearing this wicked taunt, told Muhammad what the local people were saying. In reply, the Prophet said: "They lie, I bade thee remain for the sake of what I had left behind me. So return and represent me in my family and in thine. Art thou not content, O ‘Ali, that thou should be unto me as Aaron was unto Moses, save that after me there is no prophet."

According to a few hadiths, Aaron will become a brother-in-law of Muhammad since the latter will get married with his sister Miriam in Paradise. (Note: The narration states that the Prophet Muhammad mentioned: "Allaah married me to Maryam, mother of Jesus, and Kulthum [Miriam], sister of Moses, and Asiyah, the wife of Pharaoh, in Jannah. Al-Hakim al-Nishapuri classified the hadith to be authentic, while Ibn Kathir as weak.)

== Tomb of Aaron ==
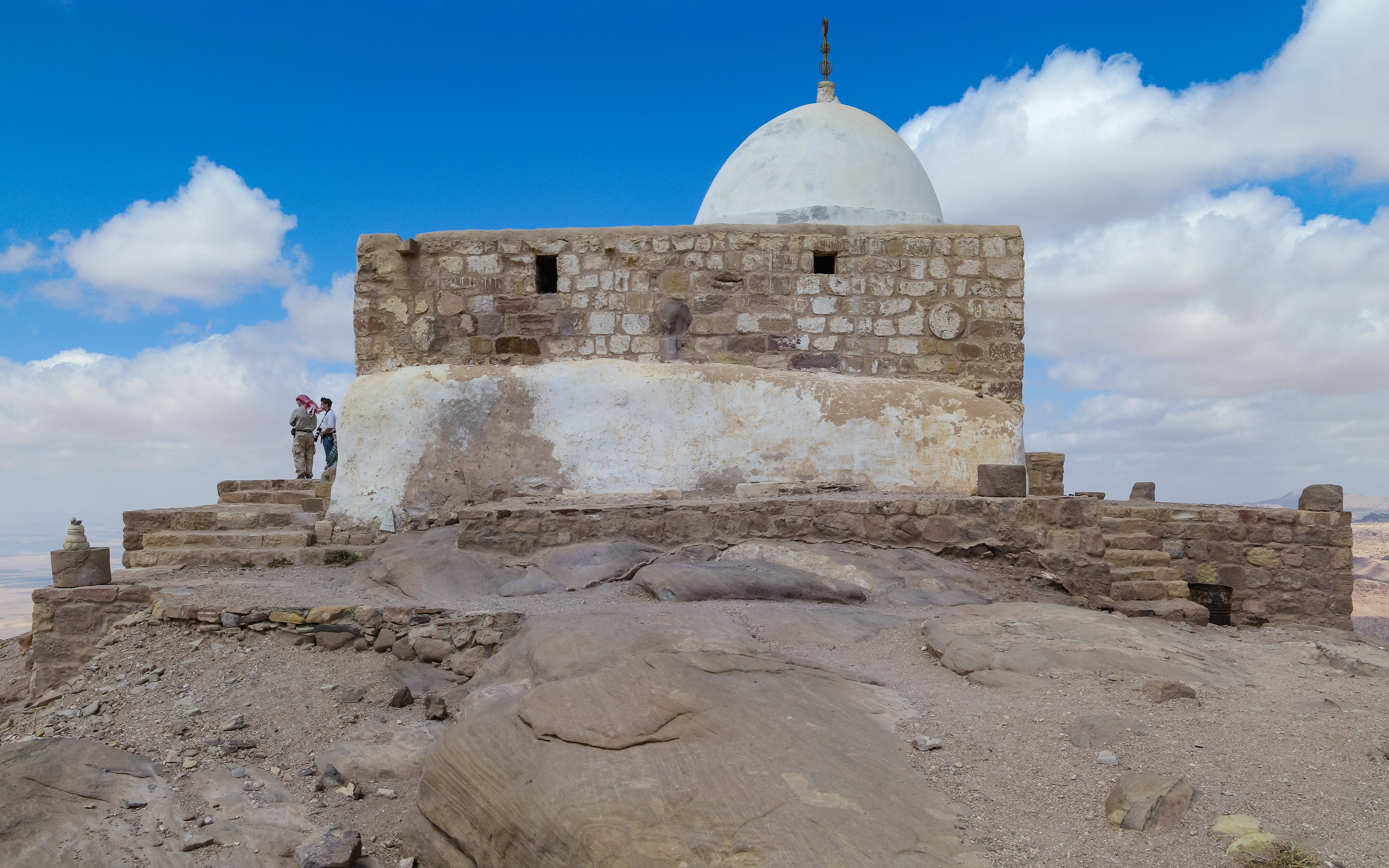
A 14th-century shrine built on top of the supposed grave of Aaron on Jabal Hārūn near Petra, Jordan

According to one Islamic tradition, the tomb of Aaron is located on Jabal Harun (Arabic: جبل هارون, Mountain of Aaron), near Petra in Jordan, with another tradition placing it in Sinai.

At 1,350.0 m (4,429.1 feet) above sea-level, Jabal Hārūn is the highest peak in the area and a place of great sanctity to the local people. A 14th-century Mamluk mosque stands there with its white dome visible from most areas in and around Petra.
