= Moses in Islam =

Islamic perspective on the prophet Moses

Prophet Musa
- موسى; Moses
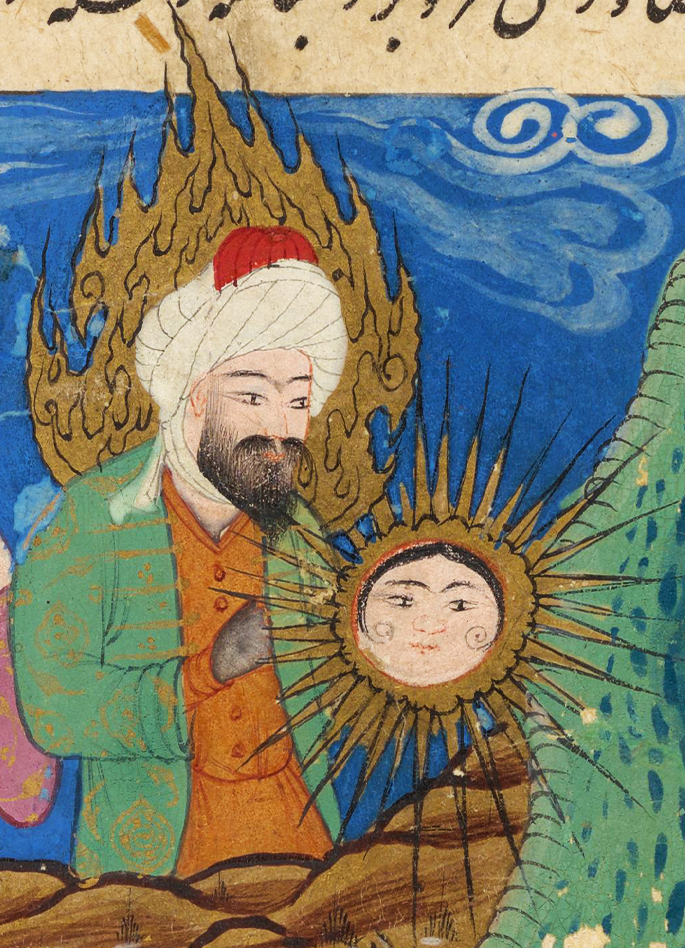
- Persian miniature depicting Musa during his victorious battle against the Pharaoh's magicians, casting divine light with his hand and turning his staff into a dragon from a 1577 Qisas al-Anbiya manuscript.

Prophet of Islam
- Preceded by: Shu'ayb
- Succeeded by: Harun; Yusa
- Title: Kaleem Allah (lit. 'Whom spoke to God')

Personal life
- Born: Musa ibn Imran
- Spouse: Saffurah
- Parents: Imran (father); Yūkābid (mother)
- Known for: Splitting the Red Sea; Being able to talk to God; Being the most named prophet in the Quran
- Relatives: Asiya (adoptive mother); Miriam bint Imran (sister); Harun ibn Imran (brother)

Religious life
- Religion: Islam

Moses in Islam, known as Musa, is a prominent prophet and messenger of God and is the most frequently mentioned individual in the Quran, with his name being mentioned 136 times and his life being narrated and recounted more than that of any other prophet. Apart from the Quran, Moses is also described and praised in the Hadith literature as well. He is one of the most important prophets and messengers in Islam.

According to the Quran, Moses was born to an Israelite family. In his childhood, he is put in a basket which flows towards the Nile, and is eventually discovered by Pharaoh's (Fir'awn) wife (not named in the Quran but called Asiya in Hadith), who takes Moses as her adopted son. After reaching adulthood, Moses then resides in Midian, before departing for Egypt again to threaten the Pharaoh. During his prophethood, Moses is said to have performed many miracles, and is also reported to have personally talked to God, who bestows the title 'Speaker of God' (Kalīm Allāh) upon Moses. The prophet's most famous miracle is dividing the Red Sea, with a miraculous staff provided by God. After Pharaoh's death, Moses and his followers travel towards the Promised Land and the prophet dies within sight of the land. Moses is reported to have met Muhammad in the seven heavens following his ascension from Jerusalem during the Night Journey (’Isrā’ Miʿrāj). During the journey, Moses is said by Muslims to have repeatedly sent Muhammad back, and request a reduction in the number of required daily prayers, originally believed to be fifty, until only the five obligatory prayers remained.

Moses is viewed as a very important figure in Islam. According to Islamic theology, all Muslims must have faith in every prophet and messenger of God, which includes Moses and his brother Aaron. The life of Moses is generally seen as a spiritual parallel to the life of Muhammad, and Muslims consider many aspects of the two individuals' lives to be shared. Islamic literature also describes a parallel relation between their people and the incidents that occurred in their lifetimes; the exodus of the Israelites from ancient Egypt is considered to be similar in nature to the migration of Muhammad and his followers from Mecca to Medina as both events unfolded in the face of persecution—of the Israelites by the ancient Egyptians, and of the early Muslims by the Meccans, respectively. His revelations, such as the Ten Commandments, form part of the contents of the Torah and are central to the Abrahamic religions of Judaism and Christianity. Consequently, Jews and Christians are designated as "People of the Book" for Muslims and are to be recognized with this special status wherever Islamic law is applied. Moses is further revered in Islamic literature, which expands upon the incidents of his life and the miracles attributed to him in the Quran and hadith, such as his direct conversations with God.

== Life ==
=== Childhood ===
In Islamic tradition, Musa was born into a family of Israelites living in Egypt. Of his family, Islamic tradition generally names his father Imran, corresponding to the Amram of the Hebrew Bible, traditional genealogies name Levi as his ancestor. Islam states that Moses was born in a time when the ruling Pharaoh had enslaved the Israelites after the time of the prophet Yusuf (Joseph). Islamic literature states that around the time of Moses's birth, the Pharaoh had a dream in which he saw fire coming from the city of Jerusalem, which burned everything in his kingdom except in the land of the Israelites. Another version says that the Pharaoh dreamed of a little boy who caught the Pharaoh's crown and destroyed it, although there is no authentic Islamic reference to whether the dreams actually occurred. When the Pharaoh is informed that one of the male children would grow up to overthrow him, he orders the killing of all newborn Israelite males in order to prevent the prediction from occurring. Experts of economics in Pharaoh's court advise him that killing the male infants of the Israelites would result in loss of manpower. Therefore, they suggest that male infants should be killed in one year but spared the next. Moses's brother, Aaron, was born in the year when infants were spared, while Moses was born in the year when infants were to be killed.

==== Incident of the Nile ====
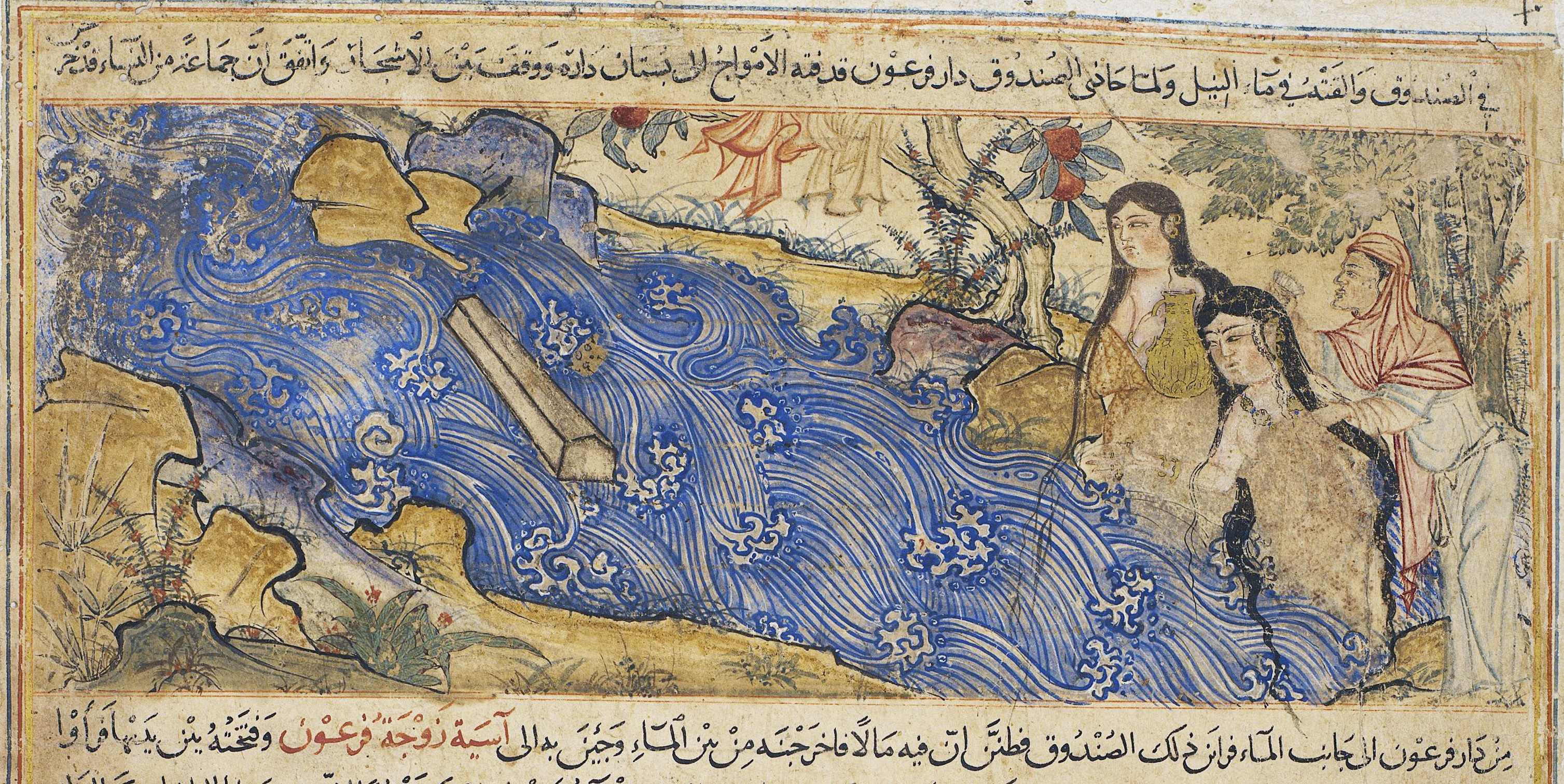
Asiya (depicted with long black tresses) and her servants, having finished bathing find baby Moses in the Nile. Their clothes hang in the trees while the river waves and crests are done in the Chinese style. Illustration from the Persian Jami' al-tawarikh

According to Islamic tradition, Jochebed, Moses's mother, suckled him secretly during this period. When they were in danger of being caught, God instructed her to put him in a wicker basket and set him adrift on the Nile. She instructs her daughter to follow the course of the ark and report back to her. As her daughter follows the ark along the riverbank, Moses is discovered by the Pharaoh's wife, Asiya, who convinces the Pharaoh to adopt him. When Asiya ordered wet nurses for Moses, Moses refuses to be breastfed. Islamic tradition states that this is because God forbade Moses from being fed by any wet nurse in order to reunite him with his mother. His sister worries that Moses has not been fed for some time, so she appears to the Pharaoh and informs him that she knows someone who can feed him. After being questioned, she is ordered to bring the woman being discussed. The sister brings their mother, who feeds Moses, and thereafter, she is appointed as the wet nurse of Moses.

== Prophethood ==
=== Test of prophecy ===
According to Isra'iliyat hadith, when Moses is on the Pharaoh's lap in his childhood, he grabs the Pharaoh's beard and slaps him in the face. This action prompts the Pharaoh to consider Moses as the Israelite who would overthrow him, and the Pharaoh wanted to kill Moses. The Pharaoh's wife persuades him not to kill him because he is an infant. Instead, he decides to test Moses. Two plates are set before young Moses, one containing rubies and the other glowing coals. Moses reaches out for the rubies, but the angel Gabriel directs his hand to the coals. Moses grabs a glowing coal and puts it in his mouth, burning his tongue. After the incident, Moses suffers a speech defect, but is spared by the Pharaoh.

=== Escape to Midian and Marriage ===
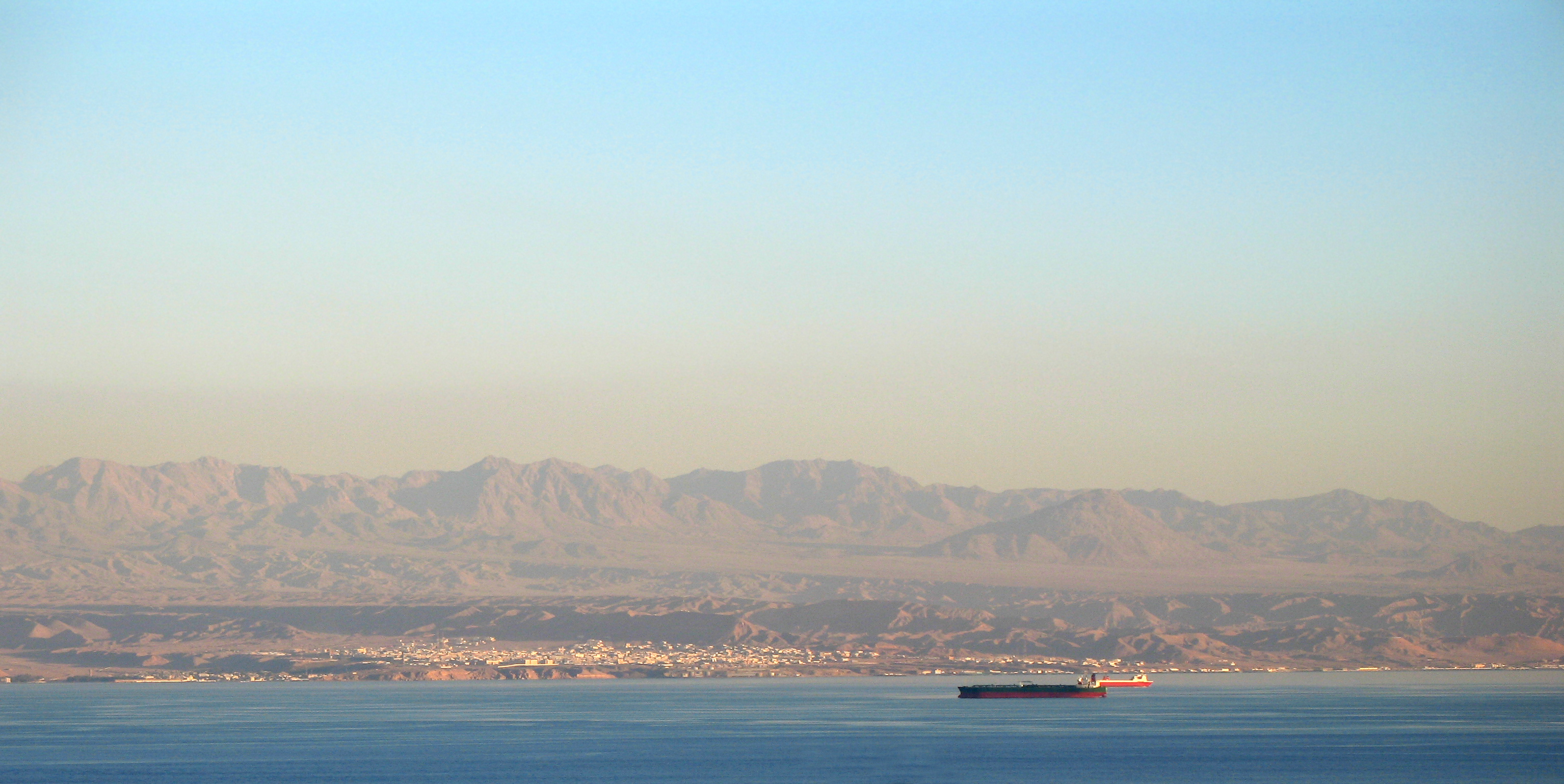
The Midian Mountains near Haql on the coast of the Gulf of Aqaba, which separates Midian in the northern part of the Arabian Peninsula and Ash-Shaam from the Sinai Peninsula in present-day Egypt

After having reached adulthood, according to the Quran, Moses is passing through a city when he comes across an Egyptian fighting with an Israelite. The Israelite man is believed to be Sam'ana, known in the Bible to be a Samaritan, who asks Moses for his assistance against the Egyptian who is mistreating him. Moses attempts to intervene and becomes involved in the dispute. Moses strikes the Egyptian in a state of anger, which results in his death. Moses then repents to God, and the following day, he again comes across the same Israelite fighting with another Egyptian. The Israelite again asks Moses for help, and as Moses approaches the Israelite, he reminds Moses of his manslaughter and asks if Moses intended to kill the Israelite. Moses is reported, and the Pharaoh orders Moses to be killed. However, Moses flees to the desert after being alerted to his punishment. According to Islamic tradition, after Moses arrives in Midian, he witnesses two female shepherds driving back their flocks from a well. Moses approaches them and inquires about their work as shepherds and their retreat from the well. Upon hearing their answers and about the old age of their father, although his identity is contested, generally accepted to be Prophet Shuaib, Moses waters their flocks for them. The two shepherds return to their home and inform their father of Moses. They then invite Moses to a feast. At that feast, their father asks Moses to work for him for eight years in return for marriage to one of his daughters. Moses consents and works for him for ten years.

=== Preaching ===
==== Call to prophethood ====
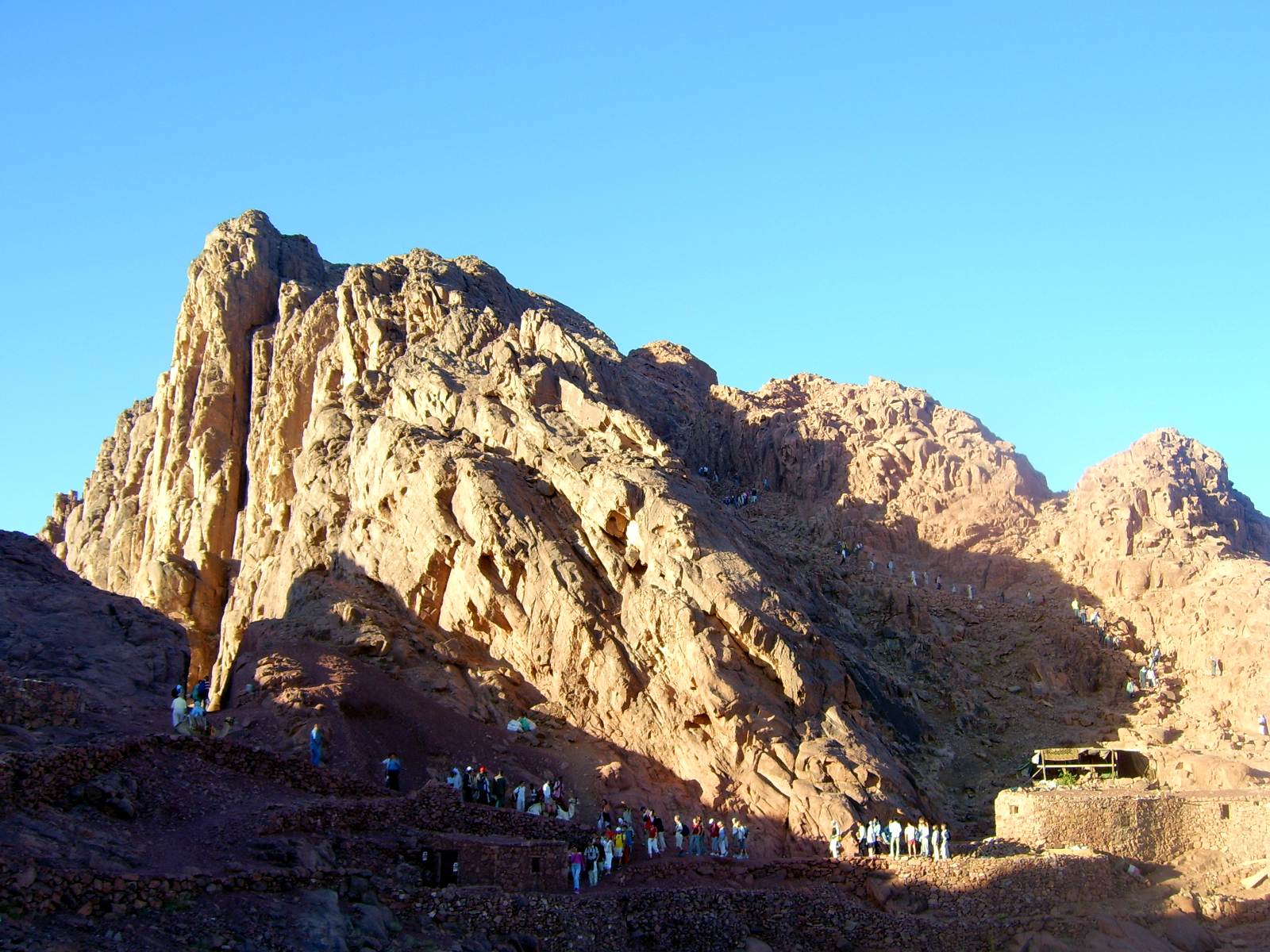
One of the suggested locations of the Biblical Mount Sinai, where Moses first spoke to God

According to the Quran, Moses departs for Egypt along with his family after completing the contracted time period. During their travel, as they stop near At-Tur, Moses observes a large fire and instructs the family to wait until he returns with fire for them. When Moses reaches the Valley of Tuwa, God calls out directly to him from the right side of the valley from a tree, on what is revered as Al-Buq‘ah Al-Mubārakah ("The Blessed Ground") in the Quran. Moses is commanded by God to remove his shoes and is informed of his selection as a prophet, his obligation of prayer and the Day of Judgment. Moses is then ordered to throw his rod, which turns into a snake, and later instructed to hold it. The Quran then narrates Moses being ordered to insert his hand into his clothes and when he revealed it, it shines a bright light. God states that these are signs for the Pharaoh, and orders Moses to invite Pharaoh to the worship of one God. Moses expresses his fear of Pharaoh and requests God to heal his speech impediment and grant him Aaron as a helper. According to Islamic tradition, both of them state their fear of Pharaoh, but are assured by God that He would be observing them and commands them to inform the Pharaoh to free the Israelites. Therefore, they depart to preach to the Pharaoh.

The Quran states that Moses was sent by God to confront the erstwhile (pharaoh) of ancient Egypt and to guide the Israelites, who were enslaved by the former. The Quran directly validates Moses and Aaron as prophets chosen by God:

And mention in the Book ˹O Prophet, the story of˺ Moses. He was truly a chosen man, and was a messenger and a prophet. We called him from the right side of Mount Ṭûr, and drew him near, speaking ˹with him˺ directly. And We appointed for him—out of Our grace—his brother, Aaron, as a prophet.

— Surah Maryam 19:51-53

Because he is the only Prophet to be directly spoken to by God (evidenced in Surah An-Nisa 4:164, "[...] and to Moses, Allah spoke directly"), whereas the others would communicate through Angel Gabriel, Moses is titled Kaleem Allah ("Speaker of God").

==== Arrival at Pharaoh's court ====
When Moses and Aaron arrive in the court of Pharaoh and proclaim their prophethood to the Pharaoh, the Pharaoh begins questioning Moses about the God he follows. The Quran narrates that Moses answers the Pharaoh by stating that he follows the God who gives everything its form and guides them. The Pharaoh then inquires about the generations who passed before them, and Moses answers that knowledge of the previous generations is with God. The Quran also mentions the Pharaoh questioning Moses: “And what is the Lord of the worlds?” Moses replies that God is the lord of the heavens, the earth and what is between them. The Pharaoh then reminds Moses of his childhood with them and the killing of the man he has done. Moses admits that he has committed the deed in ignorance, but insists that he is now forgiven and guided by God. Pharaoh accuses him of being mad and threatens to imprison him if he continues to proclaim that the Pharaoh is not the true god. Moses informs him that he has come with manifest signs from God. When the Pharaoh demands to see the signs, Moses throws his staff to the floor, and it turns into a serpent. He then draws out his hand, and it shines a bright white light. The Pharaoh's counselors advises him that this is sorcery, and on their advice he summons the best sorcerers in the kingdom. The Pharaoh challenges Moses to a battle between him and the Pharaoh's magicians, asking him to choose the day. Moses chose the day of a festival.

==== Confrontation with sorcerers ====
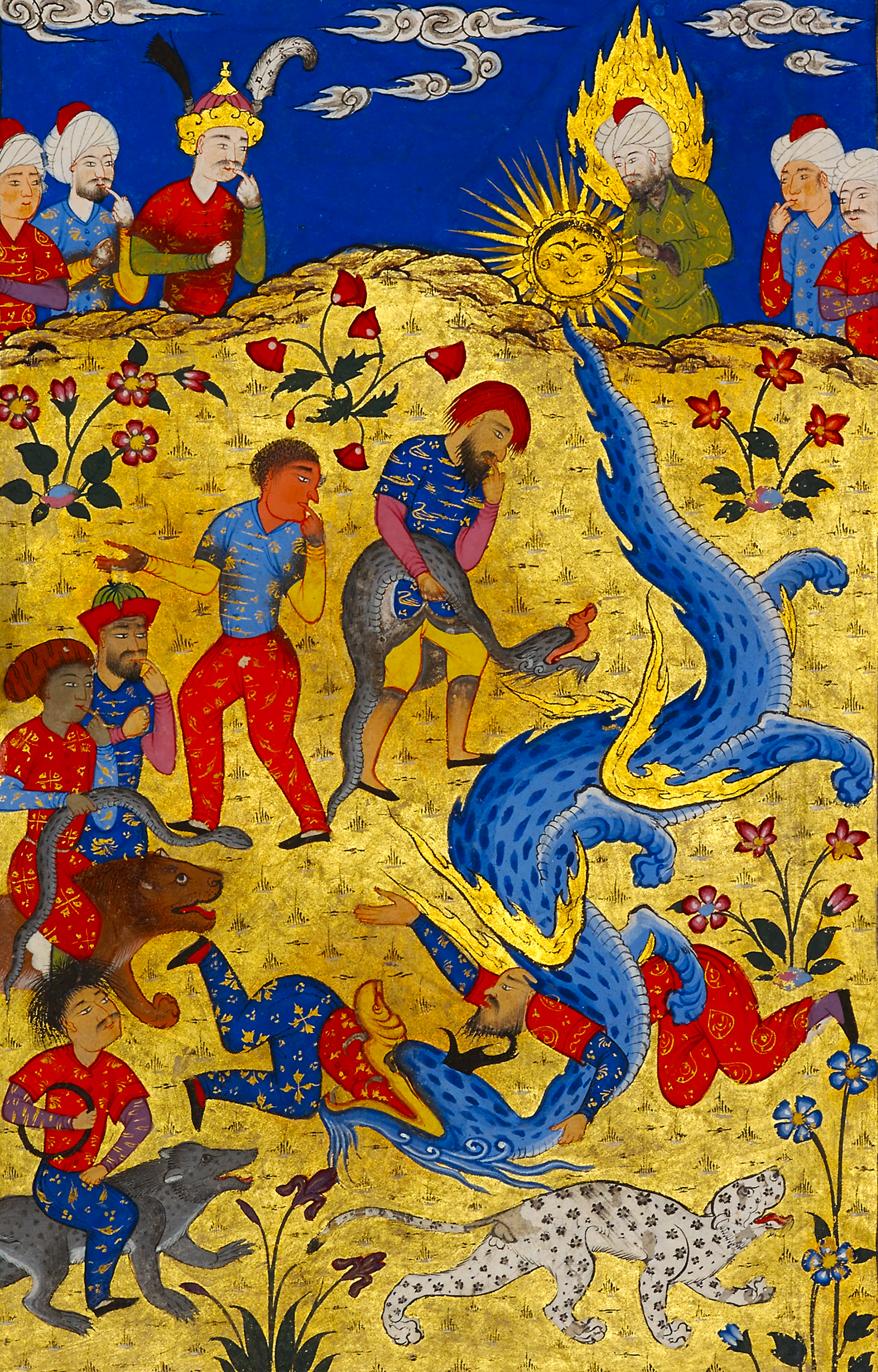
One of Pharaoh's sorcerers is devoured by the dragon summoned by Musa, who at the same time casts the divine light with his hand.

When the sorcerers come to the Pharaoh, he promises them that they would be among the honored among his assembly if they won. On the day of the festival of Egypt, Moses grants the sorcerers the chance to perform first and warned them that God would expose their tricks. The Quran states that the sorcerers bewitch the eyes of the observers and cause them terror. The summoned sorcerers throw their rods on the floor, and they appear to change into snakes by the effect of their magic. At first, Moses becomes concerned witnessing the tricks of the magicians, but is assured by God to not be worried. When Moses does the same his rod, the serpent devours all the sorcerers' snakes. The sorcerers realize that they have witnessed a miracle. They proclaim belief in the message of Moses and fall onto their knees in prostration despite threats from the Pharaoh. The Pharaoh is enraged by this and accuses them of working under Moses. He warns them that if they insist in believing in Moses, he would cut their hands and feet on opposite sides, and crucify them on the trunks of palm trees for their betrayal of the Pharaoh. The magicians, however, remain steadfast to their newfound faith and die as believers.

=== Exodus ===
==== Plagues of Egypt ====
After losing against Moses, the Pharaoh continues to plan against Moses and the Israelites, ordering meetings with the ministers, princes and priests. According to the Quran, the Pharaoh is reported to have ordered his minister, Haman, to build a tower so that he "may look at the God of Moses". Gradually, the Pharaoh begins to fear that Moses may convince the people that he is not the true god, and wants to have Moses killed. After this threat, a man from the family of Pharaoh, who had years ago warned Moses, comes forth and warns the people of the punishment of God for the wrongdoers and reward for the righteous. The Pharaoh defiantly refuses to allow the Israelites to leave Egypt. The Quran states that God decrees punishments over him and his people. These punishments come in the form of floods that demolish their dwellings, swarms of locust that destroy the crops, pestilence of lice that makes their life miserable, toads that croak and spring everywhere, and the turning of all drinking water into blood. Each time the Pharaoh is subjected to humiliation, his defiance becomes greater. The Quran mentions that God instructs Moses to travel at night with the Israelites and warns them that they would be pursued. The Pharaoh chases the Israelites with his army after realizing that they have left during the night.

==== Dividing the sea ====
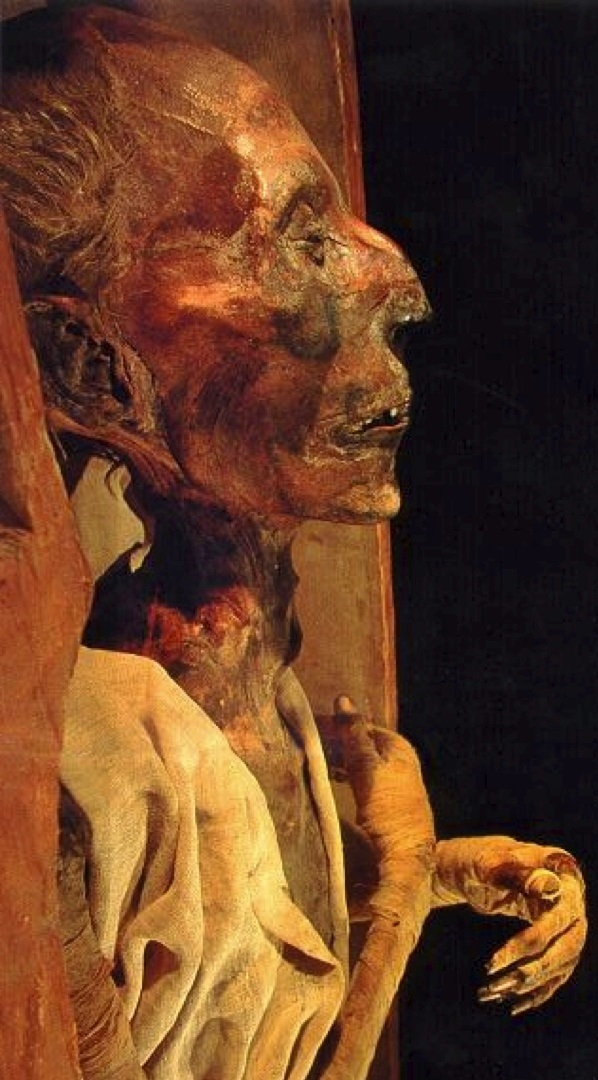
The mummy of Ramesses II, the Pharaoh most commonly associated with Quran 10:92

Having escaped and now being pursued by the Egyptians, the Israelites stop when they reach the seafront. The Israelites exclaim to Moses that they would be overtaken by Pharaoh and his army. In response, God commands Moses to strike the Red Sea with his staff, instructing them not to fear being inundated or drowning in sea water. Upon striking the sea, the sea is split by God, forming a path that allows the Israelites to pass through. The Pharaoh witnesses the sea dividing alongside his army, but as they also try to pass through, the sea closes in on them. As he is about to die, Pharaoh proclaims belief in the God of Moses and the Israelites, but his belief is rejected by God. One authentic hadith mentions that Angel Gabriel shoved sand into Pharaoh's mouth to stop him from saying anything more, fearing God would forgive him despite his insincerity. The Quran states that the body of the Pharaoh is made a sign and warning for all future generations. As the Israelites continue their journey to the Promised Land, they come upon people who are worshipping idols. The Israelites request to have an idol to worship, but Moses refuses and states that the polytheists would be destroyed by God. They are granted manna and quail as sustenance from God, but the Israelites ask Moses to pray to God for the earth to grow lentils, onions, herbs and cucumbers for their sustenance. When they stop in their travel to the Promised Land due to lack of water, Moses is commanded by God to strike a stone, and upon its impact twelve springs came forth, each for a specific tribe of the Israelites.

=== Years in the wilderness ===
==== Revelation of the Torah ====
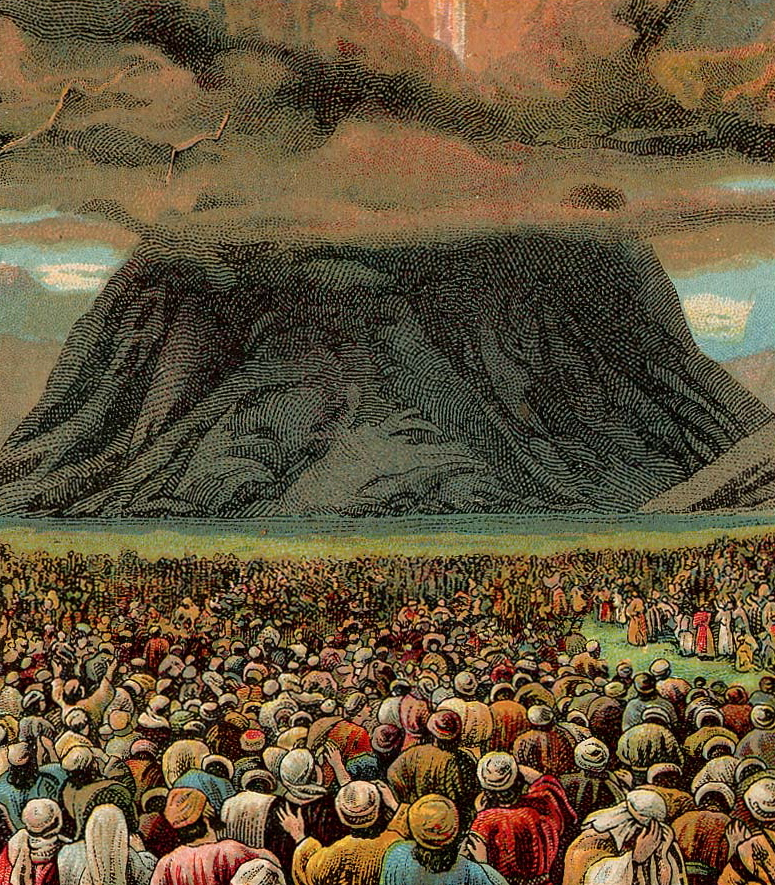
The revelation of the Torah at Mount Sinai as depicted in Biblical illustrations

After leaving Egypt, Moses leads the Israelites to Mount Sinai (Tur). Upon arrival, Moses leaves the people, instructing them that Aaron is to be their leader during his absence. Moses encountered Iblis at Mount Sinai and Moses asked him why he refused to prostrate before Ādam. Moses is commanded by God to fast for thirty days and to then proceed to the valley of Tuwa for guidance. God orders Moses to fast again for ten days before returning. After completing his fasts, Moses returns to the spot where he had first received his miracles from God. He takes off his shoes as before and goes down into prostration. Moses prays to God for guidance and begs God to reveal himself to him. It is narrated in the Quran that God tells him that it would not be possible for Moses to perceive God, but that He would reveal himself to the mountain, stating: "You cannot see Me! But look at the mountain. If it remains firm in its place, only then will you see Me." When God reveals himself to the mountain, it instantaneously turns into ashes, and Moses loses consciousness. When he recovers, he goes down in total submission and asks forgiveness of God.

Moses is then given the Ten Commandments by God as Guidance and as Mercy. Meanwhile, in his absence, a man named Samiri creates a Golden Calf, proclaiming it to be the God of Moses. The people begin to worship it. Aaron attempts to guide them away from the Golden Calf, but the Israelites refuse to do so until Moses returns. Moses, having thus received the scriptures for his people, is informed by God that the Israelites has been tested in his absence, and they have gone astray by worshiping the Golden Calf. Moses comes down from the mountain and returns to his people. The Quran states that Moses, in his anger, grabs hold of Aaron by his beard and admonishes him for doing nothing to stop them, but when Aaron tells Moses of his fruitless attempt to stop them, Moses understands his helplessness, and they both pray to God for forgiveness. Moses then questions Samiri for creating the Golden Calf. Samiri replies that it had simply occurred to him, and he had done so. Samiri is exiled, and the Golden Calf is burned to ashes, and the ashes are thrown into the sea. The wrong-doers who have worshipped the Calf are ordered to be punished for their crime.

Moses then chooses 70 elites from among the Israelites and orders them to pray for forgiveness. Shortly thereafter, the elders travel alongside Moses to witness the speech between Moses and God. Despite witnessing the speech between them, they refuse to believe until they see God with their own eyes, so as punishment, a thunderbolt kills them. Moses prays for their forgiveness, and they are resurrected. They return to camp and set up a tent dedicated to worshiping God, as Aaron had taught them from the Torah. They resume their journey towards the Promised Land.

==== The Israelites and the cow ====
Islamic exegesis narrates the incident of an old and pious man who lives among the Israelites and earns his living honestly. As he is dying, he places his wife, his little son, and his only possession—a calf in God's care—instructing his wife to take the calf and leave it in a forest. His wife does as she is told, and after a few years, when the son has grown up, she informs him about the calf. The son travels to the forest with a rope. He prostrates and prays to God to return the calf to him. As the son prays, the now-grown cow stops beside him. The son takes the cow with him. The son is also pious and earns his living as a lumberjack.

One wealthy man among the Israelites dies and leaves his wealth to his son. The relatives of the wealthy son secretly murder the son in order to inherit his wealth. The other relatives of the son come to Moses and ask for his help in tracing the killers. Moses instructs them to slaughter a cow, cut out its tongue, and then place it on the corpse; this would reveal the killers. The relatives do not believe Moses and do not understand why they are instructed to slaughter a cow when they are trying to find the killers. They accuse Moses of joking, but Moses manages to convince them that he is serious. Hoping to delay the process, the relatives ask the type and age of the cow they should slaughter, but Moses tells them that it is neither old nor young but in-between the two ages. Instead of searching for the cow described, they inquire about its colour, to which Moses replies that it is yellow. They ask Moses for more details, and he informs them that it is unyoked, and does not plow the soil nor does it water the tilth. The relatives and Moses search for the described cow, but the only cow that they find to fit the description belongs to an orphaned youth. The youth refuses to sell the cow without consulting his mother. All of them travel together to the youth's home. The mother refuses to sell the cow, despite the relatives constantly increasing the price. They urge the orphaned son to tell his mother to be more reasonable. However, the son refuse to sell the cow without his mother's agreement, claiming that he would not sell it even if they offered to fill its skin with gold. At this, the mother agrees to sell it for its skin filled with gold. The relatives and Moses consent, and the cow is slaughtered and the corpse is touched by its tongue. The corpse rises back to life and reveals the identity of the killers.

==== Meeting with Al-Khidr ====
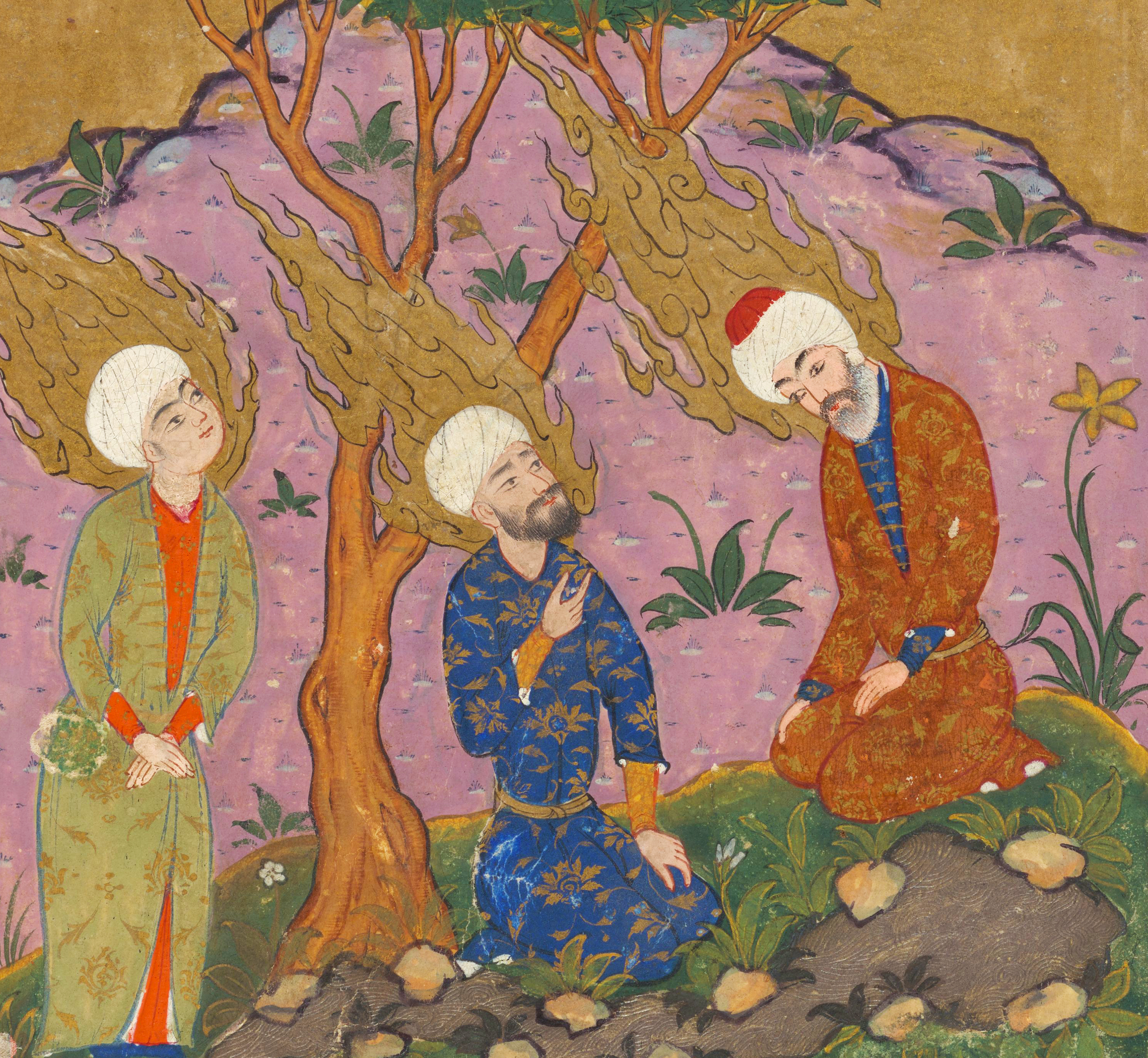
Islamic depiction of Yusha (left) and Musa (middle) visiting Khidr (right)

One hadith recounts that when Moses is delivering an impressive sermon, an Israelite inquires if there were anyone more knowledgeable than him. When Moses denies any such person exists, he receives a revelation from God, which admonishes Moses for not attributing absolute knowledge to God and informs Moses that there is someone named Al-Khidr who is more knowledgeable than him. Upon inquiry, God informs Moses that Al-Khidr would be found at the junction of two seas. God instructs Moses to take a live fish and at the location where it would escape, Al-Khidr would be found. Afterwards, Moses departs and travels with a boy named Yusha (Yeshua bin Nun), until they stop near a rock where Moses rests. While Moses is asleep, the fish escapes from the basket. When Moses wakes up, they continue until they stop to eat. At that moment, Yusha remembers that the fish had slipped from the basket at the rock. He informs Moses about the fish, and Moses remembers God's statement, so they retrace their steps back to the rock. There they see Al-Khidr. Moses approaches Al-Khidr and greets him. Al-Khidr instead asks Moses how people are greeted in their land. Moses introduces himself, and Al-Khidr identifies him as the prophet of the Israelites. According to the Quran, Moses asks Al-Khidr: "May I follow you, provided that you teach me some of the right guidance you have been taught?" Al-Khidr warns that he would not be able to remain patient and consents on the condition that Moses would not question his actions.

They walk on the seashore and pass by a ship. The crew of the ship recognize Al-Khidr and offer them to board their ship free of charge. When they are on the boat, Al-Khidr takes an adze and pulls up a plank. When Moses notices what Al-Khidr is doing, he is astonished and stops him. Moses reminds Al-Khidr that the crew has taken them aboard for free. Al-Khidr admonishes Moses for forgetting his promise of not asking. Moses states that he has forgotten and asks to be forgiven. When they leave the seashore, they pass by a boy playing with others. Al-Khidr takes hold of the boy's head and kills him. Moses is again astonished by this action and questions Al-Khidr regarding what he had done. Al-Khidr admonishes Moses again for not keeping his promise, and Moses apologizes and asks Al-Khidr to leave him if he again questions Al-Khidr. Both of them travel on until they happened upon a village. They ask the villagers for food, but the inhabitants refuse to entertain them as guests. They see therein a wall which is about to collapse, and Al-Khidr repairs the wall. Moses asks Al-Khidr why he had repaired the wall when the inhabitants refuse to entertain them as guests and give them food. Moses states that Al-Khidr could have taken wages for his work.

Al-Khidr informs Moses that they are now to part ways as Moses has broken his promise. Al-Khidr then explains each of his actions. He informs Moses that he had broken the ship with the adze because a ruler who reigns in those parts took all functional ships by force; Al-Khidr has created a defect in order to prevent their ship from being seized. Al-Khidr then explains that he has killed the child because he was defiant and disobedient to his parents, and Al-Khidr fears that the child would overburden them with his misconduct, and explained that God would replace him with a better child who is more obedient and has more affection. Al-Khidr then explains that he has fixed the wall because it belongs to two helpless orphans whose father was a pious man. God wishes to reward them for their piety. Al-Khidr states that there is a treasure hidden underneath the wall, and by repairing it, it would not break until the orphans are of age to be able to reclaim it.

==== Other incidents ====
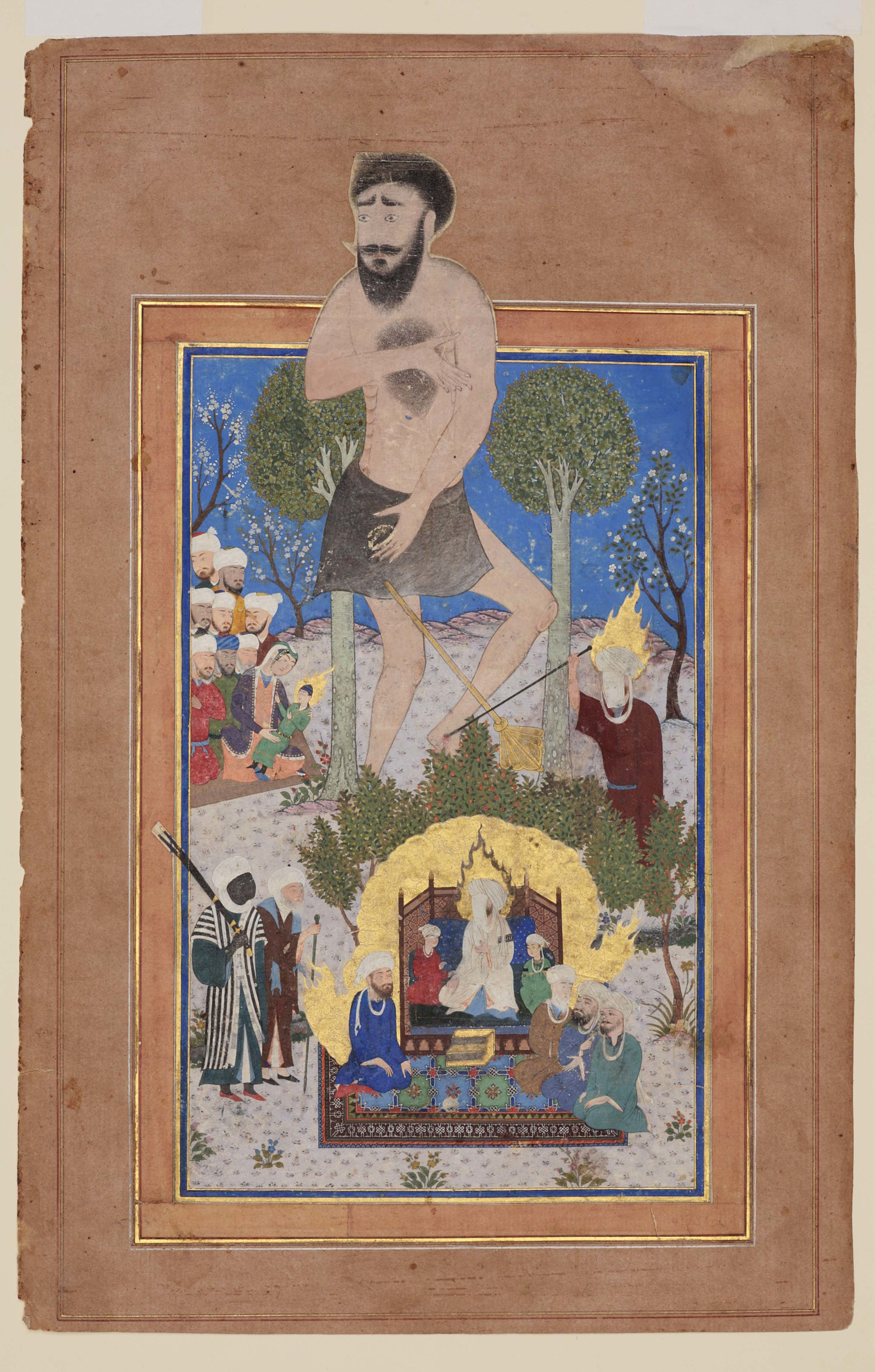
Musa va 'Uj, a 15th-century painting showing Moses (on the right, haloed) slaying the giant 'Uj by striking his feet with a staff

The sayings of Muhammad (hadith), Islamic literature and Quranic exegesis also narrate some incidents of the life of Moses. One story goes that because of his extreme hayaa' (shyness/modesty), Moses would bathe alone and apart from the other Israelites who all bathe together. This leads the Bani Israel to say that Moses does so due to a scrotal hernia. One day, when Moses is bathing in seclusion, he puts his clothes on a stone, and the stone flees with his clothes. Moses rushes after the stone, and when the Bani Israel see him, they say, 'By God, Moses has got no defect in his body". Moses then beats the stone with his clothes, and Abu Huraira states, "By God! There are still six or seven marks present on the stone from that excessive beating". In a hadith, Muhammad states that the stone still has three to five marks due to Moses hitting it.

== Death ==
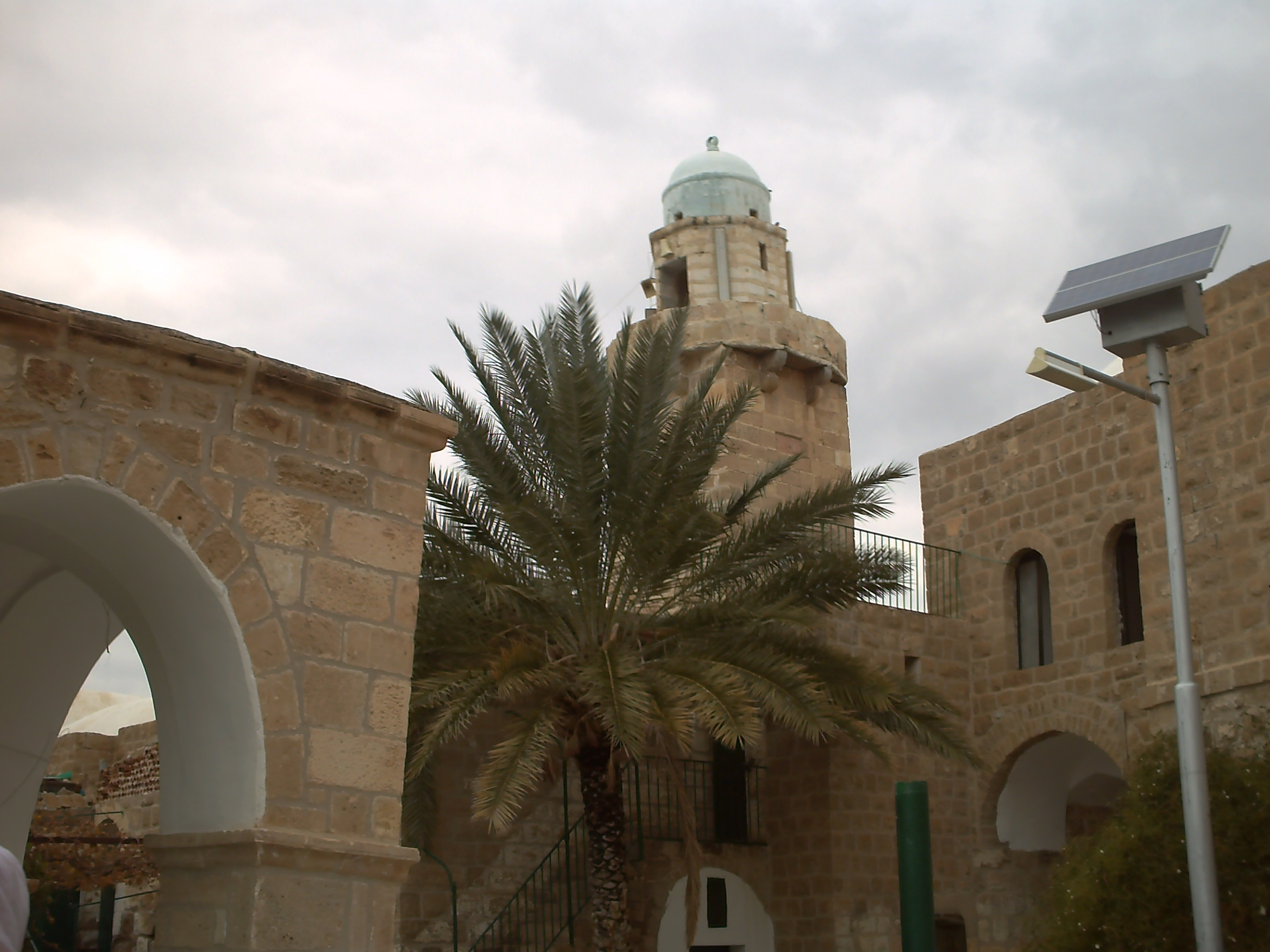
Maqam Musa, Jericho, Palestine

Aaron dies shortly before Moses. It is reported in a Sunni hadith that when Azrael, the Angel of Death, comes to Moses, Moses slaps him in the eye. The angel returns to God and tells Him that Moses does not want to die. God tells the angel to return and tell Moses to put his hand on the back of an ox, and for every hair that comes under his hand, he would be granted a year of life. When Moses asks God what would happen after the granted time, God informs him that he would die after the period. Moses, therefore, requests God for death at his current age near the Promised Land "at a distance of a stone's throw from it."

=== Burial place ===
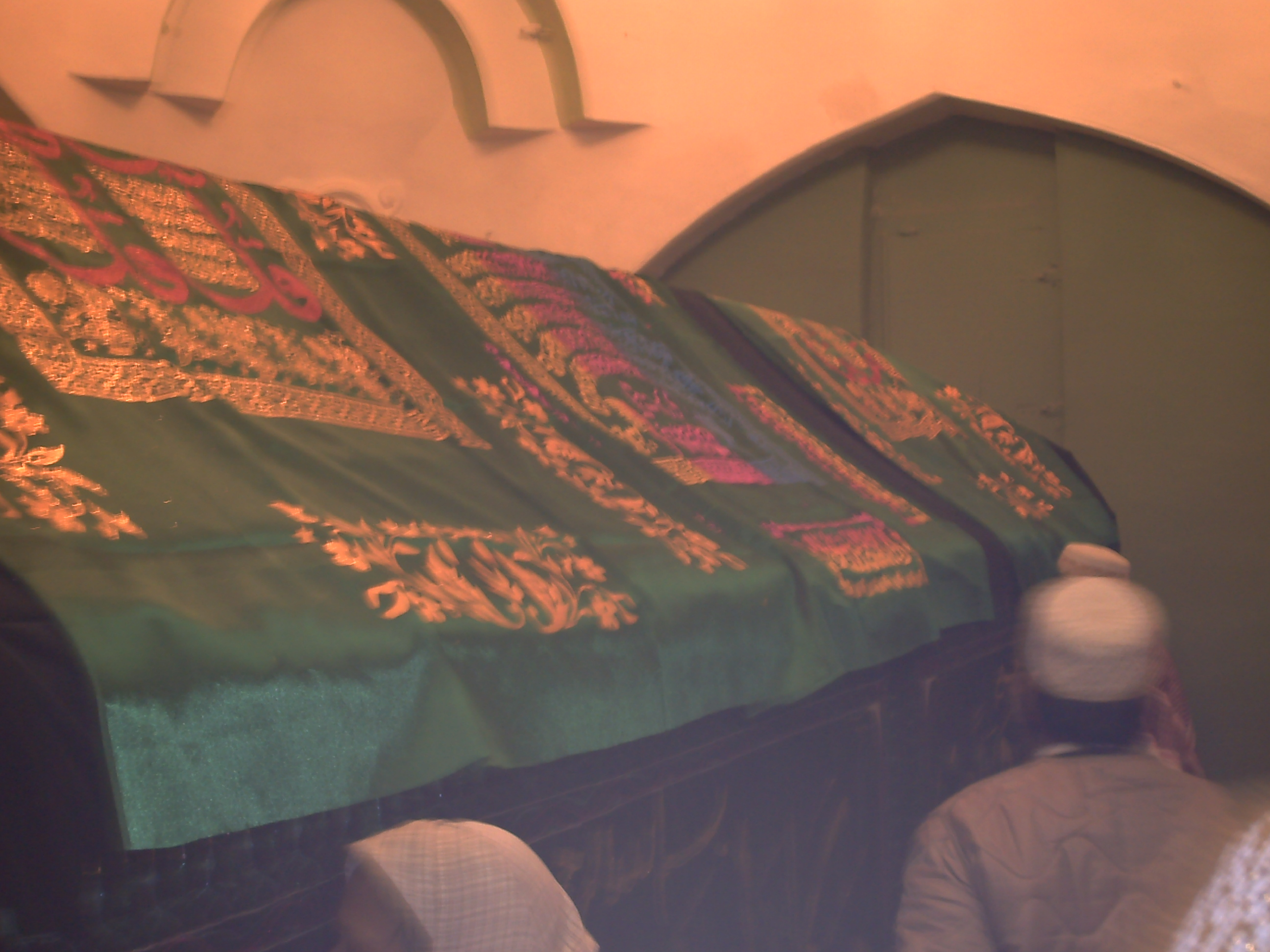
Grave of Moses, between Jericho and Jerusalem

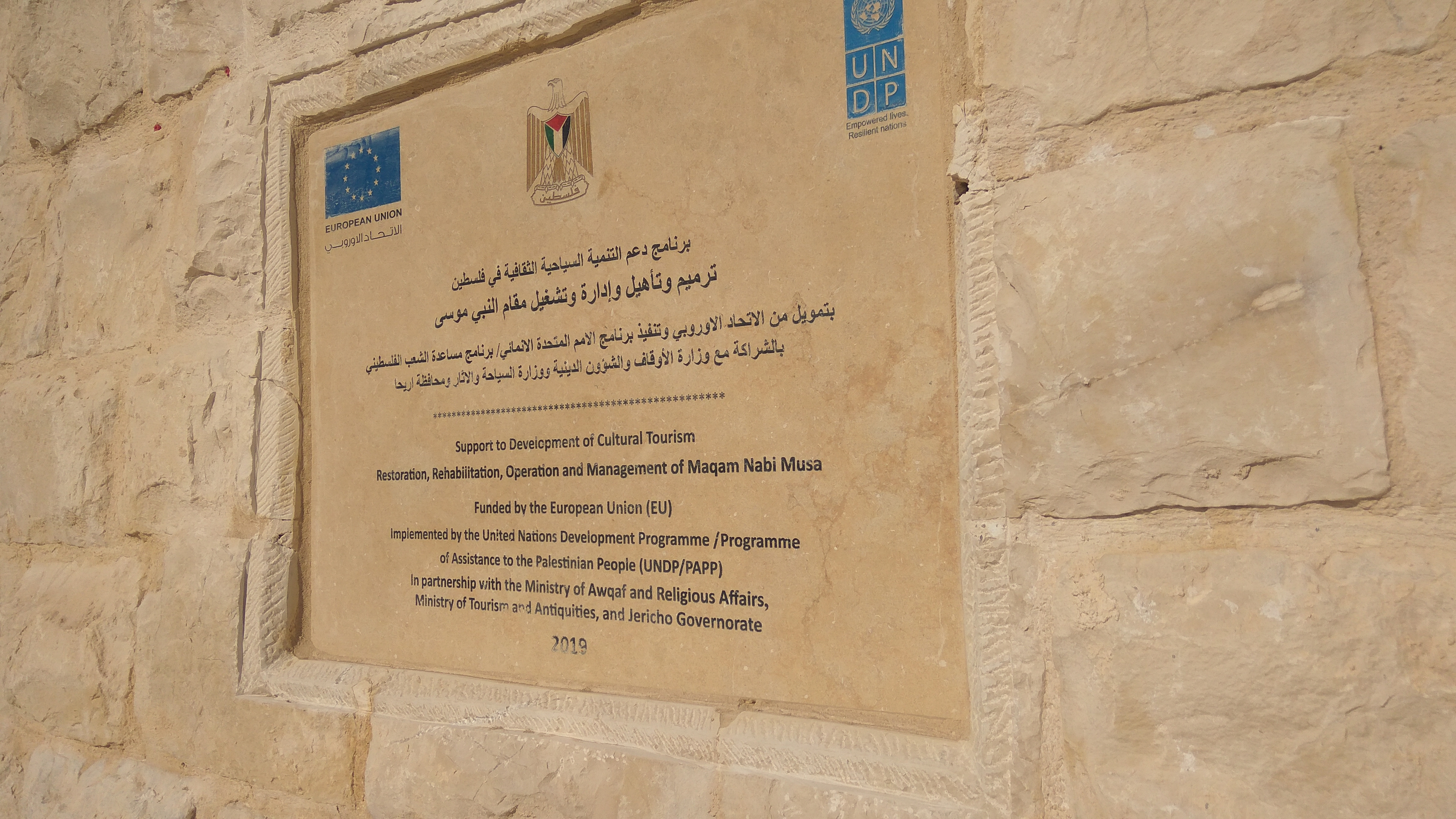
Name plate for Moses, between Jericho and Jerusalem

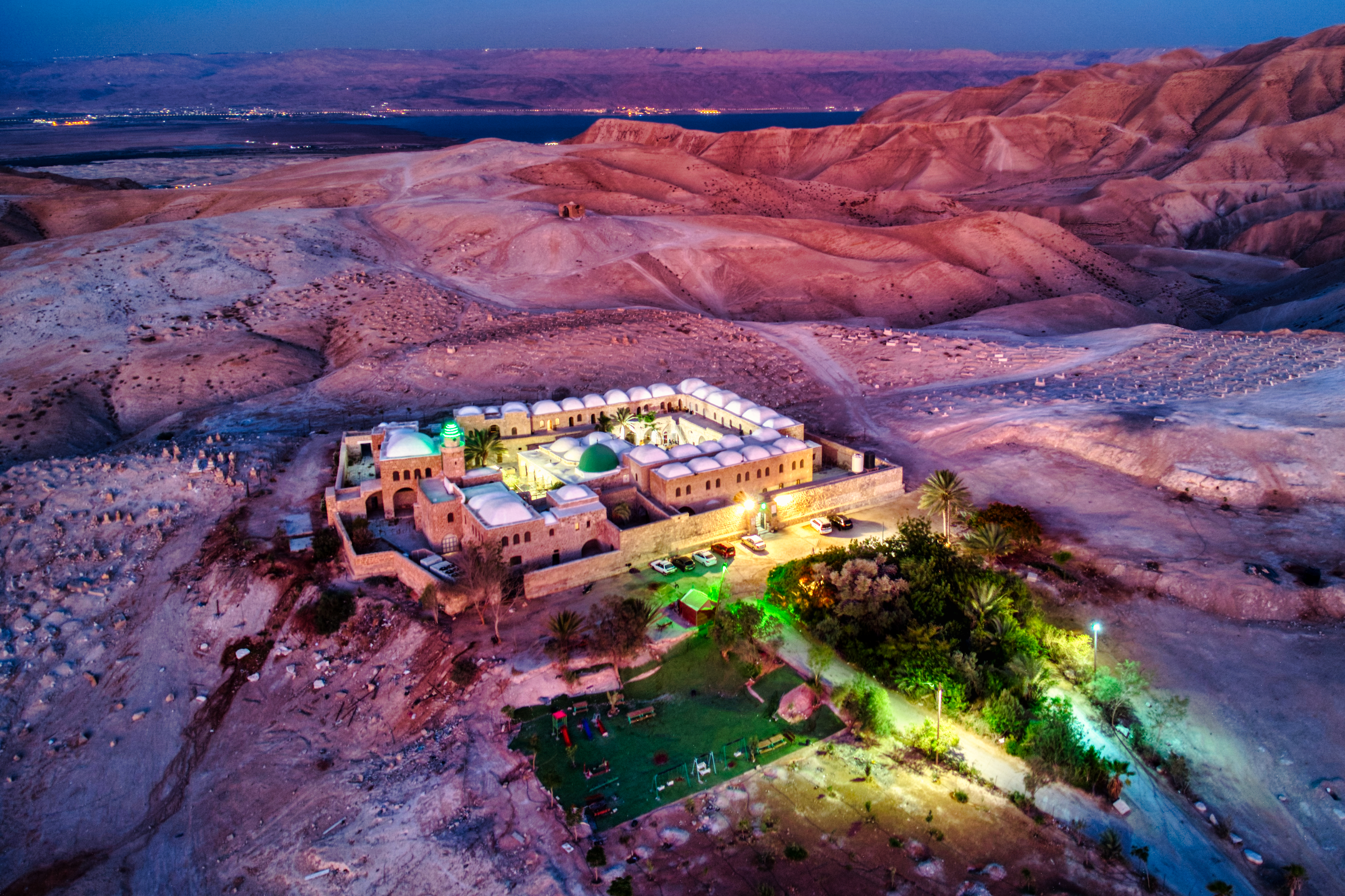
Nabi Musa Compound in twilight time

The grave of Moses is located at Maqam El-Nabi Musa, which lies 11 km (6.8 mi) south of Jericho and 20 km (12 mi) east of Jerusalem in the Judean wilderness. A side road to the right of the main Jerusalem-Jericho road, about 2 km (1.2 mi) beyond the sign indicating sea level, leads to the site. The Fatimid, Taiyabi and Dawoodi Bohra sects also believe in the same.

The main body of the present shrine, mosque, minaret and some rooms were built during the reign of Baibars, a Mamluk Sultan, in 1270. Over the years Nabi Moses was expanded, protected by walls, and includes 120 rooms in its two levels which hosted the visitors.

==== Martyrdom ====
Moreover, by indicating that Moses wants to be separated from Aaron, his brother, many of the Israelites proclaim that Moses had killed Aaron on the mountain to secure this so-called separation. However, according to the accounts of al-Tabari, Aaron dies of natural causes: “When they [Moses and Aaron] fell asleep, death took Harun.... When he was dead, the house was taken away, the tree disappeared, and the bed was raised to heaven”. When Moses returns to the Children of Israel, his followers, from the mountain without Aaron, they are found saying that Moses killed Aaron because he envied their love for Aaron, for Aaron was more forbearing and more lenient with them. This notion would strongly indicate that Moses could have indeed killed Aaron to secure the separation for which he prayed to God. To redeem his faith to his followers though, al-Tabari quotes Moses by saying “He was my brother. Do you think that I would kill him?” It was recorded that Moses recited two rak’ahs to regain the faith of his followers. God answers Moses’ prayers by making the bed of Aaron descend from heaven to earth so that the Children of Israel could witness the truth that Aaron died of natural causes.

The unexpected death of Aaron appears to make the argument that his death is merely an allusion to the mysterious and miraculous death of Moses. In the accounts of Moses’s death, al-Tabari reports, “[W]hile Musa was walking with his servant Joshua, a black wind suddenly approached. When Joshua saw it, he thought that the Hour—the hour of final judgement—was at hand. He clung to Musa…. But Musa withdrew himself gently from under his shirt, leaving it in Joshua’s hand”. This mysterious death of Moses is also asserted in Deuteronomy 34:5, “And Moses the servant of the LORD died there in Moab”. There is no explanation to why Moses may have died or why Moses may have been chosen to die: there is only this mysterious “disappearance”. According to Islamic tradition, Moses is buried at Maqam El-Nabi Musa, Jericho.

Although the death of Moses seems to be a topic of mysterious questioning, it is not the main focus of this information. However, according to Arabic translation of the word martyr, shahid—to see, to witness, to testify, to become a model and paradigm is the person who sees and witnesses, and is therefore the witness, as if the martyr himself sees the truth physically and thus stands firmly on what he sees and hears. To further this argument, in the footnotes of the Quran translated by M.A.S. Abdel Haleem, “The noun shahid is much more complex than the term martyr….The root of shahid conveys ‘to witness, to be present, to attend, to testify, and/or to give evidence’”. Additionally, Haleem notes that the martyrs in the Quran are chosen by God to witness Him in Heaven. This act of witnessing is given to those who are “given the opportunity to give evidence of the depth of their faith by sacrificing their worldly lives, and will testify with the prophets on the Day of Judgment”. This is supported in 3:140 ^{-Abdul Haleem}: “…if you have suffered a blow, they too have the upper hand. We deal out such days among people in turn, for God to find out who truly believes, for Him to choose martyrs from among you…”

It is also stated in the Quran that the scriptures in which Moses brings forth from God to the Children of Israel are seen as the light and guidance of God himself (Surah Al-An'am 6:91). This strongly indicates that Moses dies as a martyr: Moses dies being a witness to God; Moses dies giving his sacrifice to the worldly views of God; and Moses dies in the act of conveying the message of God to the Children of Israel. Although his death remains a mystery and even though he did not act in a religious battle, he does in fact die for the causation of a Religious War, a war that showcases the messages of God through scripture.

In light of this observation, John Renard claims that Muslim tradition distinguishes three types of supernatural events: “the sign worked directly by God alone; the miracle worked through a prophet; and the marvel effected through a non-prophetic figure”. If these three types of supernatural events are put into retrospect with the understanding of martyrdom and Moses, the aspect of being a martyr plays out to resemble the overall understanding of what “Islam” translates to. The concept of martyrdom in Islam is linked with the entire religion of Islam. This whole process can be somehow understood if the term 'Islam' is appreciated. This is because being a derivate of the Arabic root s-l-m, which means "surrender" and "peace", Islam is a wholesome and peaceful submission to the will of God. Just like Moses is an example of the surrender to God, the term "martyr" further reinforces the notion that through the signs, the miracle, and the marvel, the ones chosen by God are in direct correlation to the lives of the prophets.

In conclusion, although the death of Moses is a mysterious claim by God, the framework of Moses describes the spiritual quest and progress of the individual soul as it unfolds to reveal the relationship to God. Nevertheless, because of his actions, his ability to be a witness and his success at being a model for the Children of Israel his life were a buildup to the ideals of martyrdom. His death and his faithful obligations toward God have led his mysterious death to be an example of a true prophet and a true example of a martyrdom.

== Isra and Mi'raj ==
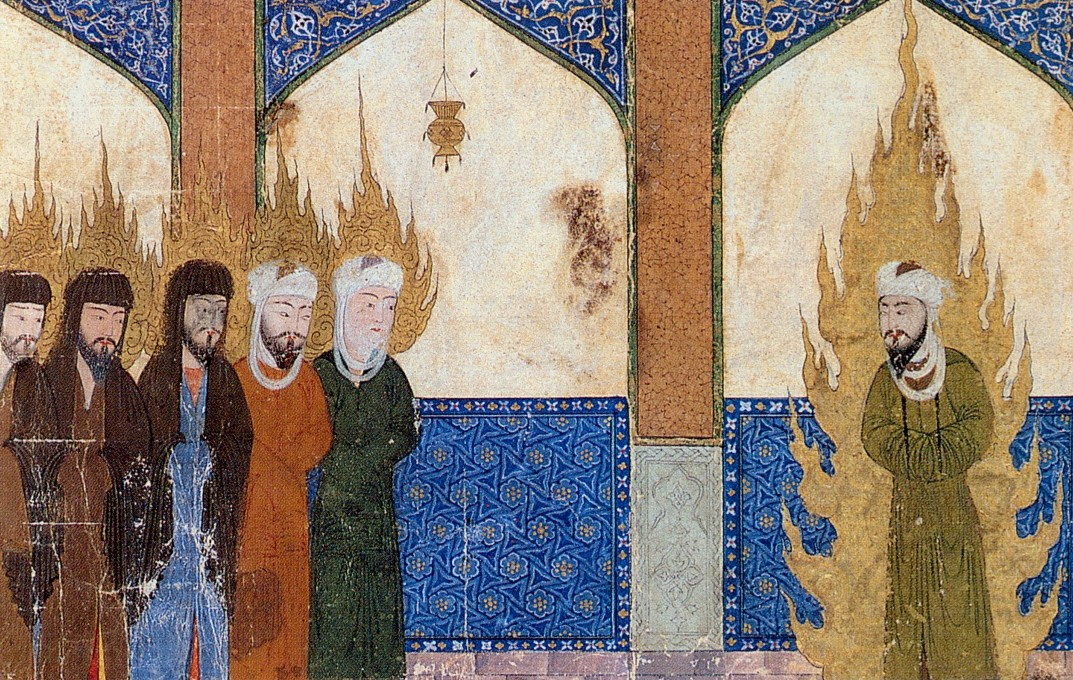
Muhammad leads Abraham, Moses, Jesus and others in prayer. Persian miniature, 15th century

During his Night Journey (Isra), Muhammad is said to have led Moses along with Jesus, Abraham and all other prophets in prayer. Moses is mentioned to be among the prophets who Muhammad meets during his ascension to heaven (Mi'raj) alongside Gabriel.

Moses and Muhammad are reported to have exchanged greetings with each other, and Moses is reported to have cried due to the fact that the followers of Muhammad are going to enter Heaven in greater numbers than his followers. When God enjoins fifty prayers to the community to Muhammad and his followers, Muhammad once again encounters Moses, who asks what has been commanded by God. When Moses is told about the fifty prayers, he advises Muhammad to ask a reduction in prayers for his followers. When Muhammad returns to God and asks for a reduction, he is granted his request. Once again, he meets Moses, who again inquires about the command of God. Despite the reduction, Moses again urges Muhammad to ask for another reduction. Muhammad again returns and asks for a reduction. This continues until only five prayers are remaining. When Moses again tells Muhammad to ask for a reduction, Muhammad replies that he is shy of asking again. Therefore, the five prayers are finally enjoined upon the Muslim community.

== In Islamic thought ==
Moses is revered as a prominent prophet and messenger in Islam, and his narrative is recounted the most among the prophets in the Quran. He is regarded by Muslims as one of the five most prominent prophets in Islam, along with Jesus (Isa), Abraham (Ibrahim), Noah (Nuh) and Muhammad. These five prophets are known as Ulu’l azm prophets, the prophets who are favored by God and are described in the Quran to be endowed with determination and perseverance. Islamic tradition describes Moses being granted many miracles, including a glowing hand and a staff that turns into a snake. The life of Moses is often described as a parallel to that of Muhammad. Both are regarded as being ethical and exemplary prophets. Both are regarded as lawgivers, ritual leaders, judges and the military leaders for their people. Islamic literature also identifies a parallel between their followers and the incidents of their history. The exodus of the Israelites is often viewed as a parallel to the migration of the followers of Muhammad. The drowning and destruction of the Pharaoh and his army is also described to be a parallel to the Battle of Badr. In Islamic tradition, Moses is especially favored by God and converses directly with Him, unlike other prophets who receives revelation by God through an intervening angel. Moses receives the Torah directly from God. Despite conversing with God, the Quran states that Moses is unable to see God. For these feats, Moses is revered in Islam as Kalim Allah, meaning the one who talks with God.

=== Revealed scripture ===
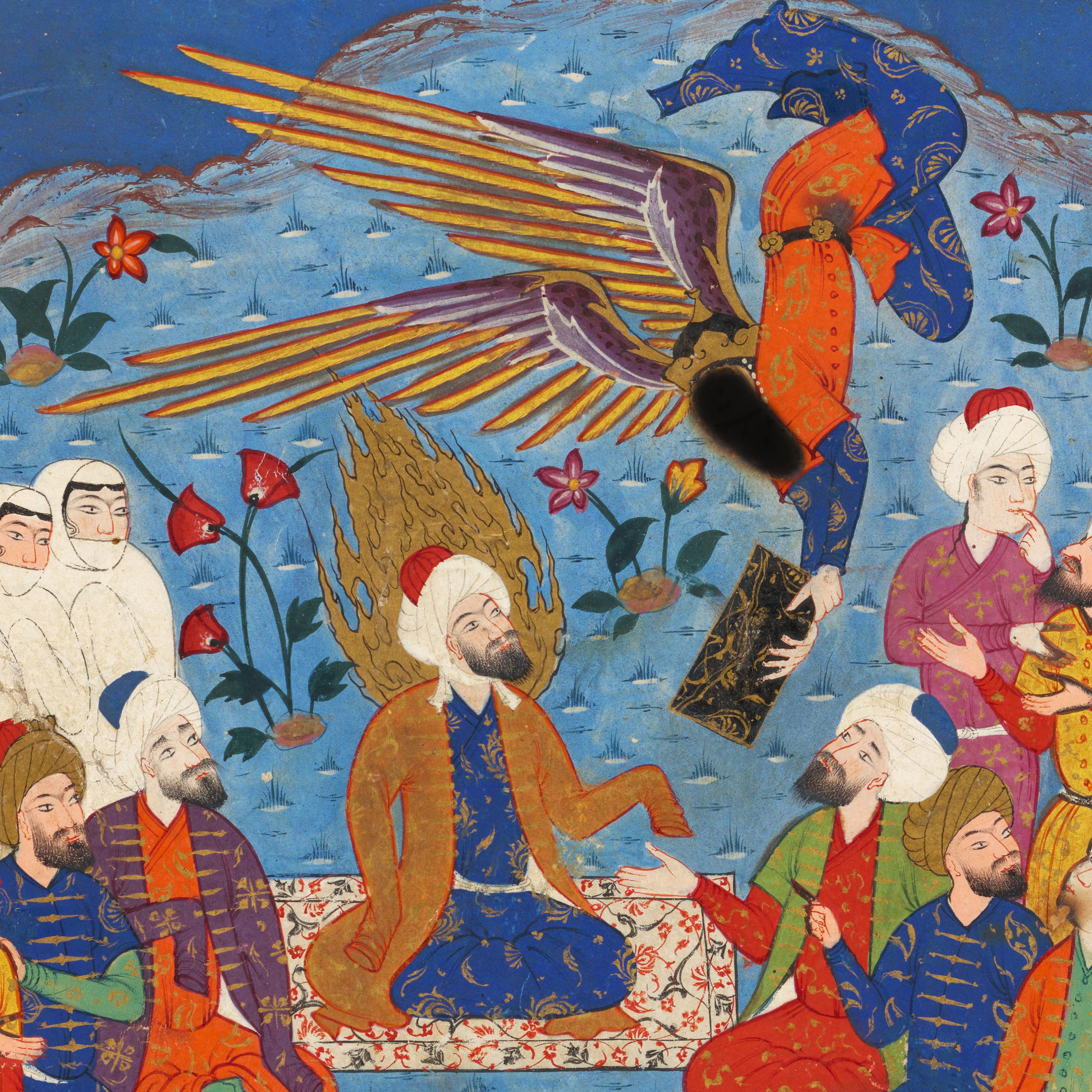
Islamic illustration of Musa receiving the Tawrat from the angel Jibril.

In Islam, Moses is revered as the receiver of a scripture known as the Torah (Tawrat). The Quran describes the Torah as “guidance and a light" for the Israelites and that it contains teachings about the Oneness of God (Tawhid), prophethood and the Day of Judgment. It is regarded as containing teachings and laws for the Israelites which are taught and practiced by Moses and Aaron to them. Among the books of the complete Hebrew Bible (Genesis, Deuteronomy, Numbers, Leviticus and Exodus), only the Torah is considered to be divinely revealed instead of the whole Tanakh or the Old Testament. The Quran mentions that the Ten Commandments are given to the Israelites through Moses, and the Commandments contain guidance and understanding of all things. The Torah was the furqan, meaning "difference", a term which is regarded as having used for itself as well. Moses preaches the same message as Muhammad, and the Torah foretells the arrival of Muhammad. Modern Muslim scholars such as Mark N. Swanson and David Richard Thomas cite Deuteronomy 18:15–18 as foretelling the arrival of Muhammad.

Some Muslims believe that the Torah has been corrupted (tahrif). The exact nature of the corruption has been discussed among scholars. The majority of Muslim scholars, including Ibn Rabban and Ibn Qutayba, have stated that the Torah had been distorted in its interpretation rather than in its text. The scholar Tabari considered the corruption to be caused by distortion of the meaning and interpretation of the Torah. Tabari considered the learned rabbis of producing writings alongside the Torah, which were based on their own interpretations of the text. The rabbis then reportedly "twisted their tongues" and made them appear as though they were from the Torah. In doing so, Al-Tabari concluded that they added to the Torah what was not originally part of it, and these writings were used to denounce Muhammad and his followers. Tabari also states that these writings of the rabbis were mistaken by some Jews to be part of the Torah. A minority view held among scholars such as Al-Maqdisi is that the text of the Torah itself was corrupted. Maqdisi claimed that the Torah had been distorted in the time of Moses, by the seventy elders when they came down from Mount Sinai. Maqdisi states that the Torah was further corrupted in the time of Ezra, when his disciples made additions and subtractions in the text narrated by Ezra. Maqdisi also stated that discrepancies between the Jewish Torah, the Samaritan Torah and the Greek Septuagint point to the fact that the Torah was corrupted. Ibn Hazm viewed the Torah of his era as a forgery and considered various verses as contradicting other parts of the Torah and the Quran. Ibn Hazm considered Ezra as the forger of the Torah, who dictates the Torah from his memory and made significant changes to the text. Ibn Hazm accepted some verses which, he stated, foretold the arrival of Muhammad.

=== In religious sects ===
Sunni Muslims fast on the Ashura (the tenth day of Muharram, the first month in the Hijri calendar as similar to Yom Kippur which is on the tenth day of Tishrei, and the first month of the Hebrew civil year) to commemorate the liberation of the Israelites from the Pharaoh. Shia Muslims view Moses and his relation to Aaron as a prefiguration of the relation between Muhammad and his son-in-law, Ali ibn Abi Talib. Ismaili Shias regard Moses as 4th in the line of the 7 'speaking prophets' (natiq), whose revealed law was for all believers to follow. In Sufism, Moses is regarded as having a special position, being described as a prophet as well as a spiritual wayfarer. The author Paul Nwyia notes that the Quranic accounts of Moses have inspired Sufi exegetes to "meditate upon his experience as being the entry into a direct relationship with God, so that later the Sufis would come to regard him as the perfect mystic called to enter into the mystery of God". Muslim scholars such as Norman Solomon and Timothy Winter state without naming that some Sufi commentators excuse Moses from the consequence of his request to be granted a vision of God, as they consider that it is "the ecstasy of hearing God which compelled him to seek completion of union through vision". The Quranic account of the meeting of Moses and Al-Khidr is also noted by Muslim writers as being of special importance in Sufi tradition. Some writers such as John Renard and Phyllis G. Jestice note that Sufi exegetes often explain the narrative by associating Moses for possessing exoteric knowledge while attributing esoteric knowledge to Al-Khidr. The author John Renard states that Sufis consider this as a lesson, "to endure his apparently draconian authority in view of higher meanings".

=== In Islamic literature ===
Moses is also revered in Islamic literature, which narrates and explains different parts of the life of Moses. Persian Muslim scholar and mystic Rumi, who titles Moses as the "spirit enkindler", also includes a story of Moses and the shepherd in his book, the Masnavi. The story narrates the horror of Moses, when he encounters a shepherd who is engaged in anthropomorphic devotions to God. Moses accuses the shepherd of blasphemy; when the shepherd repents and leaves, Moses is rebuked by God for "having parted one of His servants from Him". Moses seeks out the shepherd and informs him that he was correct in his prayers. The authors Norman Solomon and Timothy Winter regard the story to be "intended as criticism of and warning to those who in order to avoid anthropomorphism, negate the Divine attributes". Rumi mainly mentions the life of Moses by his encounter with the burning tree, his white hand, his struggle with the Pharaoh and his conversation with God on Mount Sinai. According to Rumi, when Moses came across the tree in the valley of Tuwa and perceived the tree consumed by fire, he in fact saw the light of a "hundred dawns and sunrises". Rumi considered the light a "theater" of God and the personification of the love of God. Many versions of the conversation of Moses and God are presented by Rumi; in all versions Moses is commanded to remove his footwear, which is interpreted to mean his attention to the world. Rumi commented on Quran 4:162 considering the speech of God to be in a form accessible only to prophets instead of verbal sounds. Rumi considers the miracles given to Moses as assurance to him of the success of his prophethood and as a means of persuasion to him to accept his mission. Rumi regarded Moses as the most important of the messenger-prophets before Muhammad.

The Shi'a Quranic exegesis scholar and thinker Muhammad Husayn Tabatabaei, in his commentary Balance of Judgment on the Exegesis of the Qur'an attempted to show the infallibility of Moses in regard to his request for a vision of God and his breaking of his promise to Al-Khidr as a part of the Shi'a doctrine of prophetic infallibility (Ismah). Tabatabaei attempted to solve the problem of vision by using various philosophical and theological arguments to state that the vision for God meant a necessary need for knowledge. According to Tabatabaei, Moses was not responsible for the promise broken to Al-Khidr as he had added "God willing" after his promise. The Islamic reformist and activist Sayyid Qutb, also mentions Moses in his work, In the Shade of the Quran. Sayyid Qutb interpreted the narrative of Moses, keeping in view the sociological and political problems facing the Islamic world in his era; he considered the narrative of Moses to contain teachings and lessons for the problems which faced the Muslims of his era. According to Sayyid Qutb, when Moses was preaching to the Pharaoh, he was entering the "battle between faith and oppression". Qutb believed that Moses was an important figure in Islamic teachings as his narrative symbolized the struggle to "expel evil and establish righteousness in the world" which included the struggle from oppessive tyrants, a struggle which Qutb considered was the core teaching of the Islamic faith.

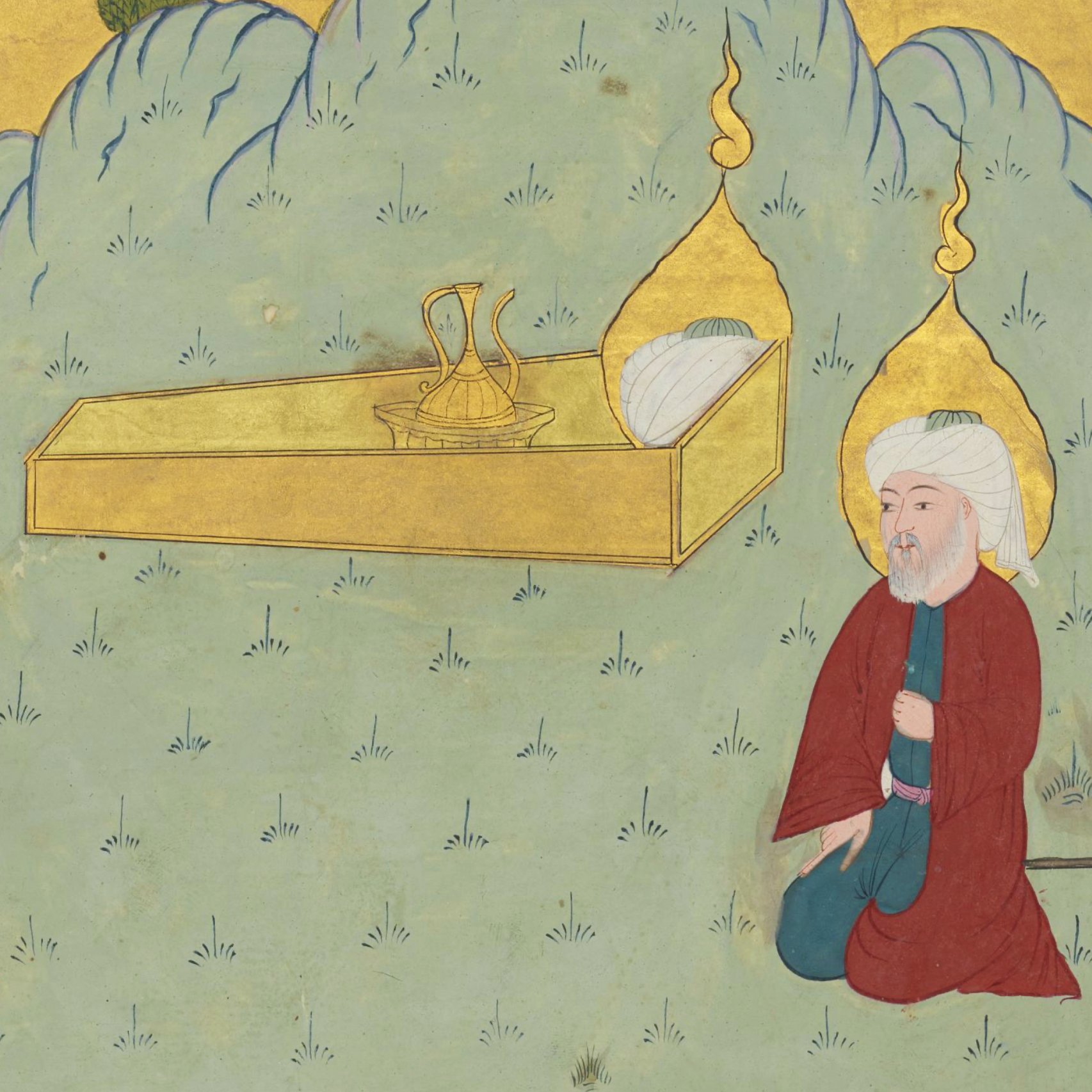
Samuil kneeling next to the ark, which some Islamic writers also consider the coffin of Musa

The Sixth Imam, Ja'far al-Sadiq, regarded the journey of Moses to Midian and to the valley of Tuwa as a spiritual journey. The turning of the face of Moses towards Midian is stated to be the turning of his heart towards God. His prayer to God asking for help of is described to be his awareness of his need. The commentary alleged to the Sixth Imam then states the command to remove his shoes symbolized the command to remove everything from his heart except God. These attributes are stated to result in him being honoured by God's speech. The Andalusian Sufi mystic and philosopher, Ibn Arabi wrote about Moses in his book The Bezels of Wisdom dedicating a chapter discussing "the Wisdom of Eminence in the word of Musa". Ibn Arabi considered Moses to be a "fusion" of the infants murdered by the Pharaoh, stating that the spiritual reward which God had chosen for each of the infants manifested in the character of Moses. According to Ibn Arabi, Moses was from birth an "amalgam" of younger spirits acting on older ones. Ibn Arabi considered the ark to be the personification of his humanity while the water of the river Nile to signifiy his imagination, rational thought and sense perception.

During the 20th century the story of Moses's confrontation with Pharaoh has been invoked by Islamists to justify their opposition to “disbelieving” secular regimes and tyrannical rulers. Sayyid Qutb (d. 1966) and Jihad movements in Egypt condemned Gamal Abdel Nasser (d. 1970) and Anwar as-Sadat (d. 1981), both presidents of Egypt, for being equivalents to the unbelieving Pharaoh who opposed Moses; members of the Jihad Group assassinated as-Sadat for being what they saw as a disbeliever. During the Iranian revolution of 1978–79, government troops were cautioned not to "Kill Moses [members of the Islamic opposition] for the sake of Pharaoh [the Shah’s regime]."

=== Appearance ===
According to Ibn Abbas, Muhammad reported, "On the night of my Ascent to Heaven, I saw Moses, who was a tall, brown man..." [Al-Bukhari and Muslim].

While all hadiths discussing Moses's appearance agree that he was brown-skinned and extremely tall, there are differing depictions on the texture of his hair.

Both narrations are found in Muhammad al-Bukhari's book Sahih al-Bukhari, a revered and trusted source of authentic hadiths. The first narration in Vol. 4 mentions Moses possessing straight hair:

The Prophet said, "I saw Moses, Jesus and Abraham (on the night of my Ascension to the heavens). Jesus was of red complexion, curly hair and a broad chest. Moses was of brown complexion, straight hair and tall stature as if he was from the people of Az-Zutt."

— Ibn Umar, Sahih Al-Bukhari, Chapter 48, no. 3438

However, the second hadith found in Vol. 7 portrays him having curly hair:

"The Prophet [...] said [...] he [Musa] is a brown curly-haired man riding a camel reigned with a strong jute rope."

— Ibn Abbas, Sahih Al-Bukhari, Book 77, No. 5913

== Quranic references ==
Moses is referenced many times in the Quran:

- Appraisals of Moses: 2:136, 4:164, 6:84, 6:154, 7:134, 20:9, 20:13, 20:36, 20:4, 25:35, 26:1, 26:21, 27:8, 28:7, 28:14, 33:69, 37:114, 37:118, 44:17
- Moses' attributes: 7:150, 20:94, 28:15, 28:19, 28:26
- Moses' prophecy: 7:144, 20:10-24, 26:10, 26:21, 27:7-12, 28:2-35, 28:46, 79:15-19
- The prophet whom God spoke to: 2:253, 4:164, 7:143-144, 19:52, 20:11-24, 20:83-84, 26:10-16, 27:8-11, 28:30-35, 28:46, 79:16-19
- The Torah: 2:41-44, 2:53, 2:87, 3:3, 3:48, 3:50, 3:65, 3:93, 5:43-46, 5:66-68, 5:110, 6:91, 6:154-157, 7:145, 7:154-157, 9:111, 11:110, 17:2, 21:48, 23:49, 25:3, 28:43, 32:23, 37:117, 40:53, 41:45, 46:12, 48:29, 53:36, 61:6, 62:5, 87:19
- The valley: 20:12, 20:20, 28:30, 79:16
- Moses' miracle: 2:56, 2:60, 2:92, 2:211, 7:107-108, 7:117-120, 7:160, 11:96, 17:101, 20:17-22, 20:69, 20:77, 26:30-33, 26:45, 26:63, 27:10-12, 27:12, 28:31-32, 40:23, 40:28, 43:46, 44:19, 44:33, 51:38, 79:20
- Moses and the Pharaoh
  - Moses' life inside the palace: 20:38-39, 26:18, 28:8-12
  - Returned to his mother: 20:4, 28:12-13
  - God's revelation to Moses' mother: 20:38-39, 28:7-10
  - Moses' preaching: 7:103-129, 10:84, 20:24, 20:42-51, 23:45, 26:10-22, 28:3, 43:46, 44:18, 51:38, 73:15-17
  - Moses met the Pharaoh: 20:58-59, 20:64-66, 26:38-44
  - The Pharaoh's magicians: 7:111-116, 10:79-80, 20:60-64, 26:37-44
  - Moses vs. the magicians: 7:115-122, 10:80-81, 20:61-70, 26:43-48
  - Dispute among the magicians: 20:62, 26:44-47
  - Moses warned the magicians: 10:81, 20:61
  - Moses and Aaron were suspected to be magicians too: 7:109, 7:132, 10:7-77, 17:101, 20:63, 40:24, 43:49
  - Belief of the magicians: 7:119-126, 20:70-73, 26:46
  - The belief of Asiya: 66:11
  - Trial to Pharaoh's family: 7:130-135
  - Pharaoh's weakness: 7:103-126, 10:75, 11:97-98, 17:102, 20:51-71, 23:46-47, 25:36, 26:11, 26:23-49, 28:36-39, 29:39, 38:12, 40:24-37, 43:51-54, 44:17-22, 50:13, 51:39, 54:41-42, 69:9, 73:16, 79:21-24
  - Moses and his followers went away: 20:77, 26:52-63, 44:23-24
  - Moses and his followers were safe: 2:50, 7:138, 10:90, 17:103, 20:78-80, 26:65, 37:115-116, 44:30-31
  - Pharaoh's belief was too late: 10:90
  - Pharaoh's and his army: 2:50, 3:11, 7:136-137, 8:52-54, 10:88-92, 17:103, 20:78-79, 23:48, 25:36, 26:64-66, 28:40, 29:40, 40:45, 43:55-56, 44:24-29, 51:40, 54:42, 69:10, 73:16, 79:25, 85:17-18, 89:13
  - Believer among Pharaoh's family: 40:28-45
  - The Pharaoh punished the Israelites: 2:49, 7:124-141, 10:83, 14:6, 20:71, 26:22, 26:49, 28:4, 40:25
  - The Pharaohs and Haman were among the rejected: 10:83, 11:97, 28:4-8, 28:32, 28:42, 29:39, 40:36, 44:31
- Moses killed an Egyptian: 20:40, 26:19-21, 28:15-19, 28:33
- Moses' journey to Median
  - Moses and Jethro: 28:25-28
  - Moses and two daughters of Jethro: 28:23-27
- The people who insulted Moses: 33:69
- Travel to the Promised Land
  - The Israelites entered the Promised Land: 2:58, 5:21-23,
  - Moses' dialogue with God: 2:51, 7:142-143, 7:155, 20:83-84
  - The Israelites worshipped the calf: 2:51-54, 2:92-93, 4:153, 7:148-152, 20:85-92
  - Seven Israelites with Moses met God: 7:155
  - Moses and Samiri: 20:95-97
  - God manifested himself to the mountain: 7:143
- Refusal of the Israelites: 2:246-249, 3:111, 5:22-24, 59:14
- Attributes of the Israelites: 2:41-44, 2:55-59, 2:61-71, 2:74-76, 2:83, 2:93-6, 2:100-101, 2:104, 2:108, 2:140-142, 2:246-249, 3:24, 3:71, 3:75, 3:112, 3:181, 3:183, 4:44, 4:46-47, 4:49, 4:51, 4:53-54, 4:153, 4:155-156, 4:161, 5:13, 5:20, 5:24, 5:42-43, 5:57-58, 5:62-64, 5:70, 5:79-82, 7:134, 7:138-139, 7:149, 7:160, 7:162-163, 7:169, 9:30, 9:34, 16:118, 17:4, 17:101, 20:85-87, 20:92, 58:8, 59:14
- Moses and Khidir: 18:60-82
- Qarun: 28:76-82, 29:39-40

== See also ==
- Aaron
- Amram
- Burning bush
- Biblical and Quranic narratives § Moses (Mūsā)
- Jochebed
- Miriam
- Moses in Judeo-Hellenistic literature
- Moses in rabbinic literature
- Prophets and messengers in Islam
- Scrolls of Moses
- Ten Commandments
- Torah in Islam
- Verse of the Mustad'afin
