= Numerology (Ismailism) =

Idea that numbers have religious meanings in Ismaili belief

Numerology is an element of Isma'ili belief that states that numbers have religious meanings. The number seven plays a general role in the theology of the Ismā'īliyya, including mystical speculations that there are seven heavens, seven continents, seven orifices in the skull, seven days in a week, seven prophets, and so forth.

== Position of the Imam ==
Old Ismaili doctrine holds that divine revelation had been given in six periods (daur) entrusted to six prophets, also called Natiq (Speaker), who were commissioned to preach a religious law to their respective communities.

For instance, Nasir Khusraw argues that the world of religion was created in six cycles, corresponding to the six days of the week. The seventh day, corresponding to the Sabbath, is the cycle in which the world comes out of darkness and ignorance and “into the light of her Lord” (Quran 39:69), and the people who “laboured in fulfilment of (the Prophets’) command” are rewarded.

While the Natiq was concerned with the rites and outward shape of religion and life, the inner meaning was entrusted to a Wasi (Representative), who would know the secret meaning of all rites and rules and would reveal them to a small circles of initiates.

The Natiq and Wasi are in turn succeeded by a line of seven Imams, who would guard what they received. The seventh and last Imam in any period would then be the Natiq of the next period. The last Imam of the sixth period however would not bring about a new religion or law but would abrogate the law and introduce din Adama al-awwal ("the original religion of Adam"), as practised by Adam and the Angels in paradise before the fall. This would be without cult or law but would consist in all creatures praising the creator and recognizing his unity. This final stage was called Qiyamah.

Natiq	Wasi	Line of Imams
Adam	Seth	... 7. Nuh
Nuh	Sem	... 7. Ibrahim
Ibrahim	Ishmael	... 7. Musa
Musa	Harun	... 7. Isa
Isa	Sim'un as-Safa	... 7. Muhammad
Muhammad	Ali	... 7. al-Qa'im
