= Samiri =

Phrase used by the Quran to refer to a rebellious follower of Moses

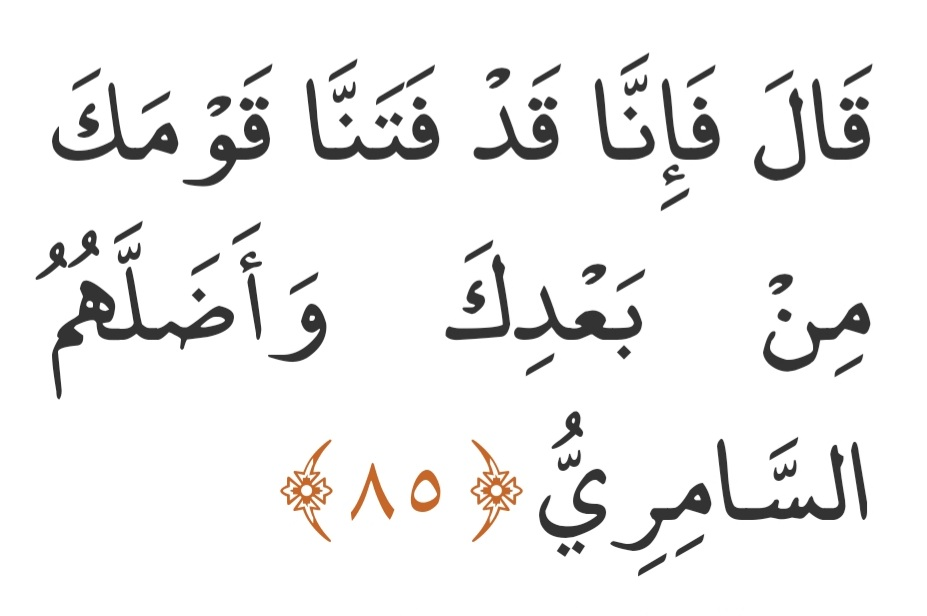
- Image of Surah Taha verse 85

Al-Sāmirī (Arabic: الْسَّامِريّ), or the Samiri (often rendered Samiri), is a rebellious follower of Moses in the Quran who created the golden calf and attempted to lead the Hebrews into idolatry. According to Surah 20 (Ta-Ha), Samiri created the calf while Moses was away for forty days on Mount Sinai, receiving the Ten Commandments.

== Name and etymology ==
The Arabic term in the Quran is al-Sāmirī (Arabic: السامري), which is morphologically a relative adjective or nisba. It has therefore often been understood as meaning “the Samaritan”. Classical Muslim exegetes generally treated Sāmirī as a proper name or as indicating descent from a group among the Israelites called al-Sāmirah, rather than as a reference to the later Samaritan community as such.

The identification of al-Sāmirī with a historical Samaritan has been controversial because the Quranic episode is set in the time of Moses, whereas the Samaritan community only emerged in later Israelite and post-exilic history. Michael Pregill notes that the Qur'an does not otherwise mention Samaritans as a community, and argues that early Quranic commentators do not appear to connect al-Sāmirī with the Samaritan community of their own time. Instead, Pregill suggests that the name evokes biblical traditions about Samaria and calf worship, especially the golden calves associated with the northern kingdom of Israel and Jeroboam. From this reading, sāmirī is better understood as "Samarian", denoting an association with the calf worship of Samaria. Pregill also discusses the possibility of wordplay connecting sāmirī with the Semitic root in the Hebrew word shōmēr, which means "watchman" or "guardian" and Arabic sāmir/samīr, which is associated with the idea of remaining awake and keeping watch during the night. Finally, Pregill arrives at the view that Al-Samiri functions as an epithet for Aaron in Quran 20, where he becomes a guardian of the Israelites that failed to protect them from idolatry in the absence of Moses.

== Identity ==
Scholars of Islam have linked Samiri to various individuals mentioned in the Bible. As-Samiri is typically translated as "the Samaritan", with the episode being seen as an explanation for the separation between Samaritans and non-Samaritans. The story parallels the Biblical narrative of the golden calves built by Jeroboam of Samaria. Samiri has been linked to the rebel Hebrew leader Zimri on the basis of their similar names and a shared theme of rebellion against Moses’ authority. Others link him to the Mesopotamian city of Samarra and suggest that he came from a cow-worshiping people, giving his name as Musa bin Zafar. Abraham Geiger proposed the idea that Samiri is a corruption of Samael, the name of an angel with similar functions to Satan in Jewish lore. There is no consensus among Islamic scholars on which, if any, of these identifications is correct.

== Quranic narrative ==
In Ta-Ha, the Quran’s twentieth surah, Moses is informed that Samiri has led his people astray in Moses’ absence. He returns to his people to berate them, and is informed of what Samiri has done.

"They argued, “We did not break our promise to you of our own free will, but we were made to carry the burden of the people’s ˹golden˺ jewellery, then we threw it ˹into the fire˺, and so did the Sâmiri.” Then he moulded for them a statue of a calf that made a lowing sound. They said, “This is your god and the god of Moses, but Moses forgot ˹where it was˺!” Did they not see that it did not respond to them, nor could it protect or benefit them? Aaron had already warned them beforehand, “O my people! You are only being tested by this, for indeed your ˹one true˺ Lord is the Most Compassionate. So follow me and obey my orders.” They replied, “We will not cease to worship it until Moses returns to us.” Moses scolded ˹his brother˺, “O Aaron! What prevented you, when you saw them going astray, from following after me? How could you disobey my orders?” Aaron pleaded, “O son of my mother! Do not seize me by my beard or ˹the hair of˺ my head. I really feared that you would say, ‘You have caused division among the Children of Israel, and did not observe my word.’”

Moses then asked, “What did you think you were doing, O Sâmiri?” He said, “I saw what they did not see, so I took a handful ˹of dust˺ from the hoof-prints of ˹the horse of˺ the messenger-angel ˹Gabriel˺ then cast it ˹on the moulded calf˺. This is what my lower-self tempted me into.” Moses said, “Go away then! And for ˹the rest of your˺ life you will surely be crying, ‘Do not touch ˹me˺!’ Then you will certainly have a fate that you cannot escape. Now look at your god to which you have been devoted: we will burn it up, then scatter it in the sea completely.”" Quran 20:87-95

The Quran’s statement that Samiri’s calf made a "lowing" sound has resulted in much speculation. A number of Islamic traditions say that the calf was made with dust trodden upon by the horse of the angel Gabriel, which had mystical properties. Some traditions say that the calf could also move, a property granted to it by the dust of the “horse of life”. Other traditions suggest that Samiri made the sound himself, or that it was only the wind. Still others say that the calf was formed by God himself, as a test for the Hebrew people. Stories indicate that he was a magician

== Islamic exegesis ==
Classical Muslim authors of commentary (tafsir) generally treated al-Sāmirī as an individual person and as the person mainly responsible for the creation of the golden calf, with Aaron, by contrast, being tasked with warning the Israelites against worshipping it. Exegetes expanded the Quranic narrative to explain the otherwise abrupt appearance of Al-Samiri in Quran 20:85 and the later question to him posed by Moses in Quran 20:95. Al-Baydawi reports several interpretations of his origin: that he belonged to an Israelite group called Al-Samirah, that he was from Kerman, that he came from Bajarma in Iraq, or that his personal name was Musa ibn Zafar.

A major problem that the exegetes sought to explain was Al-Samiri's comment in Quran 20:96 that he had taken "a handful from the trace of the messenger" and thrown it. The dominant commentary interpretation identified the "messenger" with Gabriel and explained the "trace" as dust from Gabriel's footprint, or more commonly, from the hoofprint of Gabriel's horse. According to this interpretation, Al-Samiri got the dust when the Israelites were crossing the Red Sea, or, when he (Gabriel) was escorting Moses to Sinai, and later threw it into the molten gold from which the calf was made, giving the image its strange sound or semblance of life. Ismail Albayrak argues that classical treatments of the calf episode made extensive use of isra'iliyyat, narrative material associated with Jewish and Christian traditions, although individual exegetes differed in how much of this material they accepted or suppressed.

Fakhr al-Din al-Razi rejected a supernatural subtext to the "trace of the messenger". Instead, he endorses a view attributed to Abu Muslim al-Isfahani that this phrase is about the teaching or precedent of Moses. According to this reading, Al-Samiri says that he had taken up part of Moses's guidance but then cast it aside. Michael Pregill notes that this interpretation made Moses the "messenger", rather than Gabriel, and it treats the "trace" metaphorically, thereby avoiding the problem of an attribution of an apparent miracle to Al-Samiri. Nevertheless, this view remained a minority interpretation within later tafsir.

Commentators also interpreted Moses's words to Al-Samiri in Q 20:97, lā misāsa ("no touching"), as a punishment of social exclusion. In this reading, Al-Samiri was condemned to live out his life as an outcast, unable to experience contact with others. Pregill observes that later Muslim authors connected this punishment with reports about Samaritan avoidance of contact with outsiders, although he also argues that this link is from later Islamic literature and is not supported by the Quranic wording itself.

== See also ==
- Moses in Islam
- Aaron
- Golden calf
