= Numerology (wireless) =

Concept in wireless communication engineering

In wireless communication, numerology is the specification of "waveforms" in terms of cyclic prefix, subcarrier spacing, and other parameters. The waveform selection is subject to a set of real-world restrictions, so a practical mobile communication system (with signal propagation conditions that tend to vary significantly from one location to another), utilizes a set of different waveforms, or "multiple numerologies". In some special cases (for example, for services with big differences in latencies) it might be beneficial to use waveforms with different numerologies simultaneously; this arrangement is called mixed numerology.

== Orthogonal frequency-division multiplexing ==
The nature of the orthogonal frequency-division multiplexing (OFDM) waveforms includes interconnected parameters (for example, channel bandwidth, subcarrier spacing, size of the cyclic prefix, maximum fast Fourier transform size) with the choice dictated by the external (to the waveform) conditions like delay spread and the Doppler set. For example:

- tolerating high level of the phase noise (and thus allowing the manufacturers to use cheaper local oscillators) requires larger subcarrier spacing;
- larger size of the cyclic prefix helps to counteract big delay spreads but restricts the possible carrier spacings;
- smaller subcarrier spacing negatively affects the performance in the situations with high Doppler effect (mobile connections for fast-moving vehicles).

In the mixed-numerology OFDM configuration the subcarriers from different numerologies are not orthogonal and therefore inter-numerology interference is observed.

== See also ==
- 5G NR#Numerology (sub-carrier spacing)
