= Maqamat al-Hariri =

Collection of tales from the Middle East

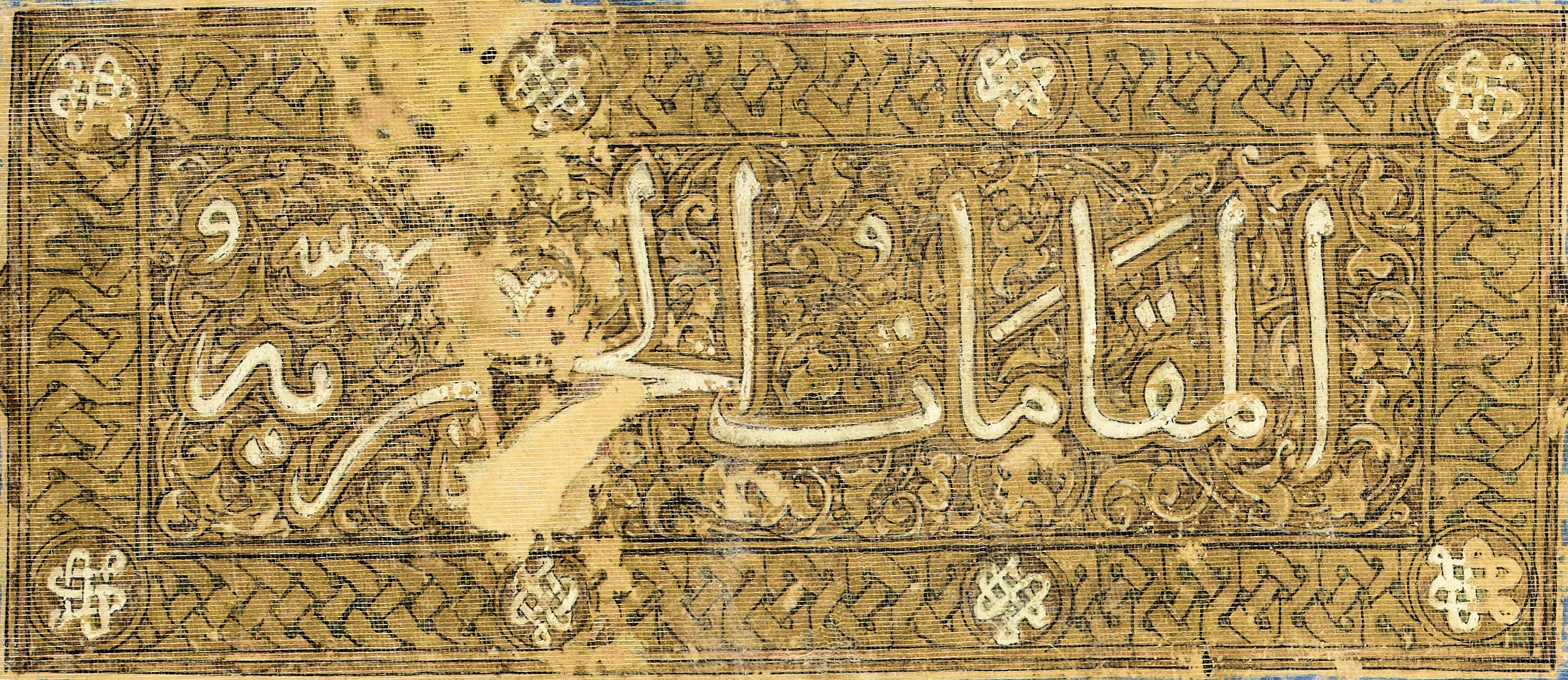
- Title "Al-maqāmāt al-Harīriyya", Bibliothèque Nationale de France (Arabe 5847).
- Author: Al-Hariri of Basra
- Original title: مقامات الحريري
- Language: Arabic
- Genre: Maqama (prose and verse)
- Publication date: 11th-12th century
- Publication place: Abbasid Caliphate
- Media type: Manuscript

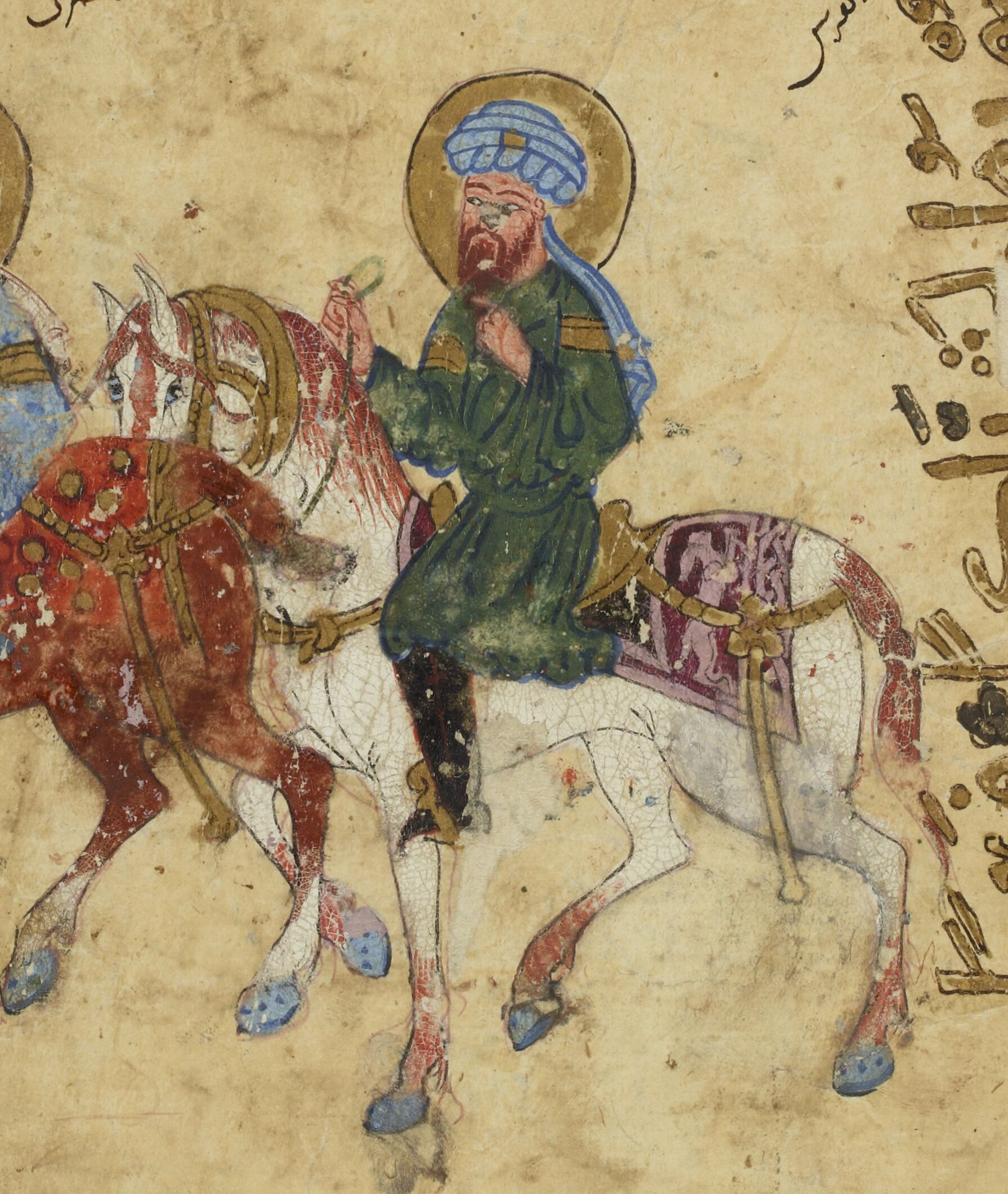
The main character Abu Zayd travelling on horse, on his way to Diyar Bakr (Maqama 43, BNF Arabe 3929, 1200-1210).

The Maqāmāt al-Ḥarīrī (Arabic: مقامات الحريري) is a collection of fifty tales or maqāmāt written at the end of the 11th or the beginning of the 12th century by al-Ḥarīrī of Basra (1054–1122), a poet and government official of the Seljuk Empire. The text presents a series of tales regarding the adventures of the fictional character Abū Zayd of Saruj who travels and deceives those around him with his skill in the Arabic language to earn rewards. Although probably less creative than the work of its precursor, Maqāmāt al-Hamadhānī (whose author lived 968–1008 CE), the Maqāmāt al-Ḥarīrī became extremely popular, with reports of seven hundred copies authorized by al-Ḥarīrī during his lifetime.

The first known manuscripts date from the 13th century, with eight illustrated manuscripts known from this period. The most famous manuscripts include one from 1237 in Baghdad (now in the Bibliothèque Nationale de France) and one from 1334 in Egypt or Syria (now in the National Library of Austria).

Altogether, more than a hundred manuscripts of the work are known, but only thirteen are illustrated. They were mainly produced over a period of about 150 years. A first phase consists in manuscripts created between 1200 and 1256 in areas between Syria and Iraq. This phase is followed by a 50-year gap, corresponding to the Mongol invasions (invasion of Persia and Mesopotamia, with the Siege of Baghdad in 1258, and the invasion of the Levant). A second phase runs from around 1300 to 1337, during the Egyptian Mamluk period, with production probably centered around Cairo.

Manuscripts of the Maqāmāt al-Ḥarīrī belong to the category of "secular Arabic manuscripts", as opposed to religious works such as illustrated Qur'ans.

== List of stories ==
After a preface by al-Hariri himself, there are 50 stories altogether, generally entitled on the format "Encounter at....", with the name of a different city for each story. The chapters are in order:
1-10 "Encounter at San'a", Holwan, Kayla, Damietta, Kufa, Maraghah (or "The Diversified"), Barkaid, Ma'arrah, Alexandria, Al-Rahba
11-20 "Encounter at Saweh", Damascus, Baghdad, Mecca, "Encounter called "The Legal"", "Encounter of the West", "Encounter called "The Reversed"", Sinjar, Nasibin, Mayyafariqin
21-30 "Encounter at Rayy al-Mahdiyeh", Euphrates, "Encounter of the Precinct", "Encounter called "Of the Portion"", Kerej, "The Encounter of the address", "The Encounter of the Tent-dwellers", Samarkand, Wasit, Sur
31-40 "Encounter at Ramlah", Tayleh, Tiflis, Zabid, Shiraz, Maltiyah, Sa'dah, Merv, Oman, Tabriz
41-50 "Encounter at Tanis", Najran, Al-Bakriya, "The Encounter called "The Wintry"", Ramlah, Aleppo, Hajr, Harmamiyeh, Sasan, Basra.

== Manuscripts ==
=== Early, non-illustrated copies ===
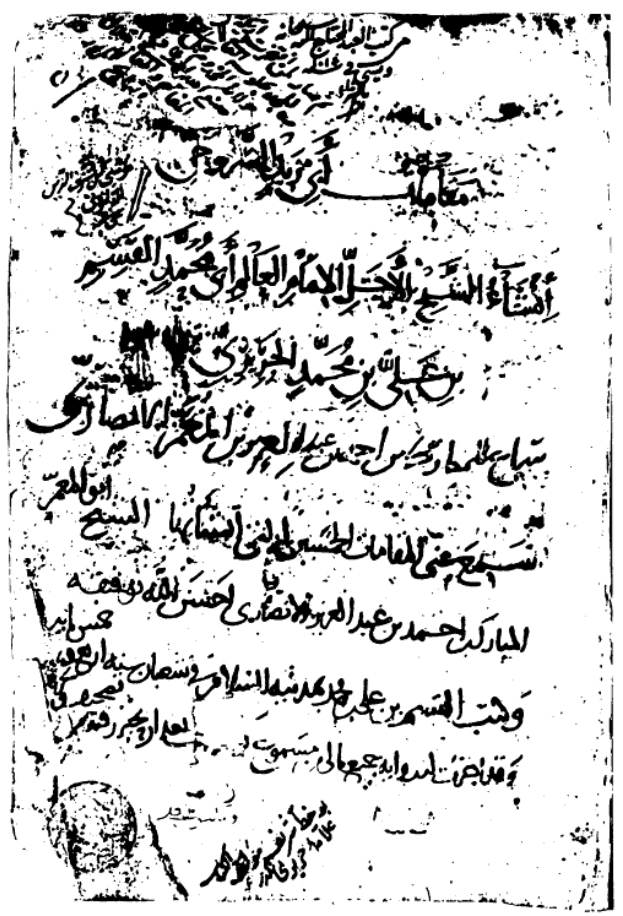
Ms Cairo Adab 105, folio 5a. Title and autograph ijaza written by al-Hariri himself, for the copyist in 1111 CE.

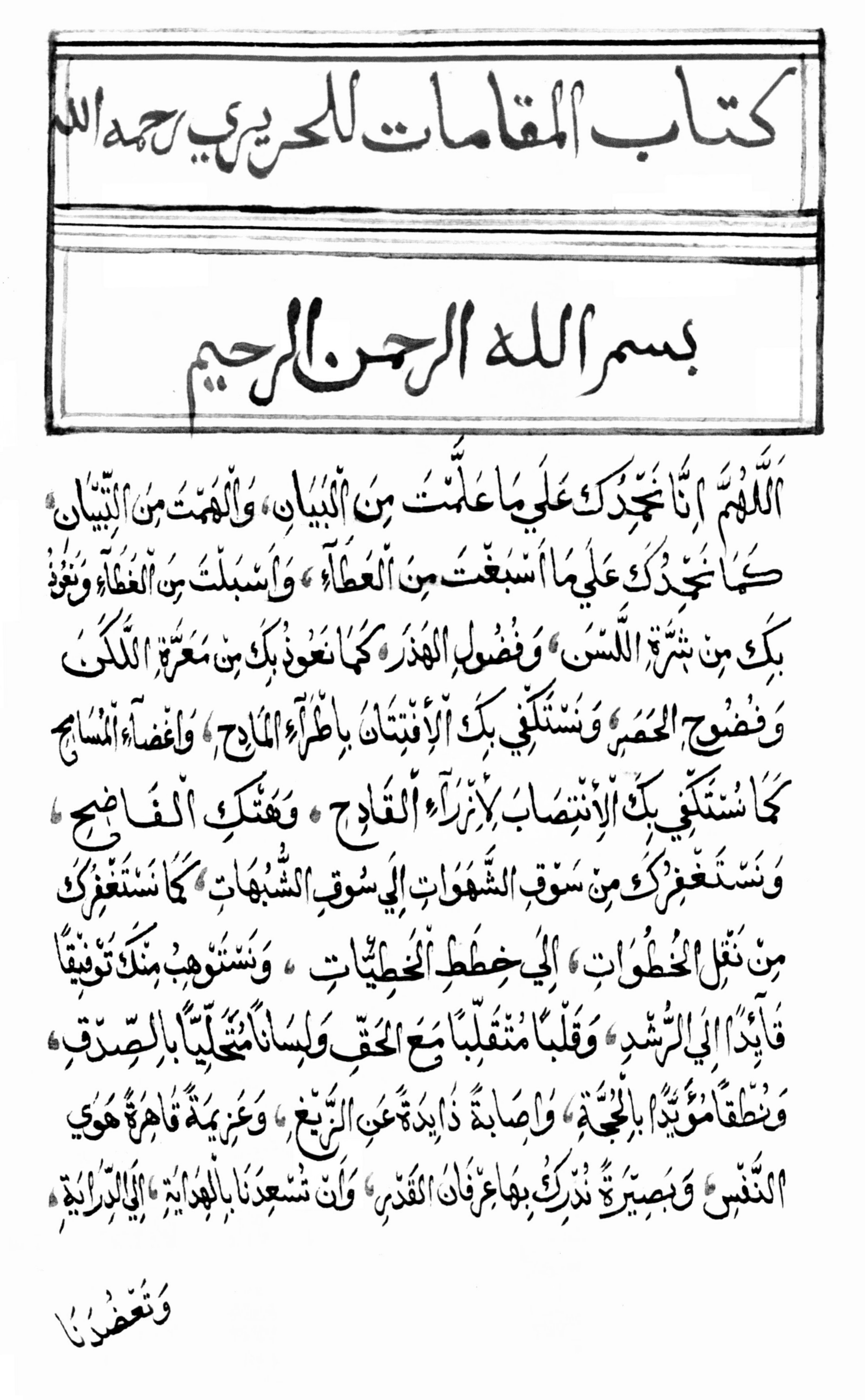
First page of 1188 CE edition (not illustrated). BNF Arabe 3924

Several early non-illustrated editions of the Maqāmāt al-Ḥarīrī are known, starting from the lifetime of al-Ḥarīrī himself (1054–1122), when he was about 56 years old. The earliest known manuscript is Cairo, National Library of Egypt, MS Adab 105, dated 504/1110–11 through an ijaza certificate of authenticity by al-Ḥarīrī himself. It is by far the earliest the earliest known manuscript, and it was copied the same year al-Ḥarīrī completed his work.

Other early manuscripts are known, such as London, British Library, Or. 2790 (557 AH/1161–62 CE); Vatican City, Biblioteca Apostolica Vaticana, Sbath 265 (583 AH/1187 CE); Paris, Bibliothèque Nationale de France, Arabe 3924 (584 AH/1188 CE); Paris, Bibliothèque Nationale de France, Arabe 3926 (611 AH/1214 CE); and Paris, Bibliothèque Nationale de France, Arabe 3927 (611 AH/1214 CE).

After this initial non-illustrative phase, illustrated Maqamat manuscripts started to appear, corresponding to a broader "explosion of figural art" in the Islamic world, from the 12th to 13th centuries, despite religious condemnations against the depiction of living creatures "because it implies a likeness to the creative activity of God".

=== Pictorial tradition ===
The origins of the pictorial tradition of Arabic illustrated manuscripts are uncertain. The first known decorated manuscripts are some Qur'ans from the 9th century CE. They were not illustrated, but were "illuminated" with decorations of the frontispieces or headings. The tradition of illustrated manuscripts started with the Graeco-Arabic translation movement and the creation of scientific and technical treatises often based on Greek scientific knowledge, such as the Arabic versions of The Book of Fixed Stars (965 CE), De materia medica or Book of the Ten Treatises of the Eye. The translators were most often Arab Syriac Christians, such as Hunayn ibn Ishaq or Yahya ibn Adi, and their work is known to have been sponsored by local rulers, such as the Artuqids.

An exposition of artistic artistry towards the illustration of manuscripts occurred in the 12th and 13th century. Throughout the 13th century in the area of Syria and Iraq, there is a lot in common stylistically between the Christian Syriac illustrated manuscripts, such as Syriac Gospels (British Library, Add. 7170), and Arab illustrated manuscripts such as the Maqamat al-Hariri. This synthesis seems to point to a common pictorial tradition that existed since circa 1180 CE in the region, which was highly influenced by Byzantine art.

==== Paris, Bibliothèque Nationale de France, Arabe 3929 (1200-1210) ====
Arabe 3929 was probably produced in Amid, modern-day Diyarbakır, Turkey, ca. 1200-1210. This manuscript probably belongs to the "Artuqid school" of painting, together with an early 1206 edition of the Automata of Ibn al-Razzaz al-Jazari, devoted to the depiction of mechanical devices (Ahmet III 3472, Topkapı Sarayı Library, securely dated to 1206 and displaying many design similarities).

This illustrated manuscript is considered the most ancient illustrated Maqāmāt known. The illustrations are rather simple and literal, which leads most specialists to attribute it to the early 13th or even late 12th century.

The first pages are lost: the manuscript starts from the second story (second Maqamah).

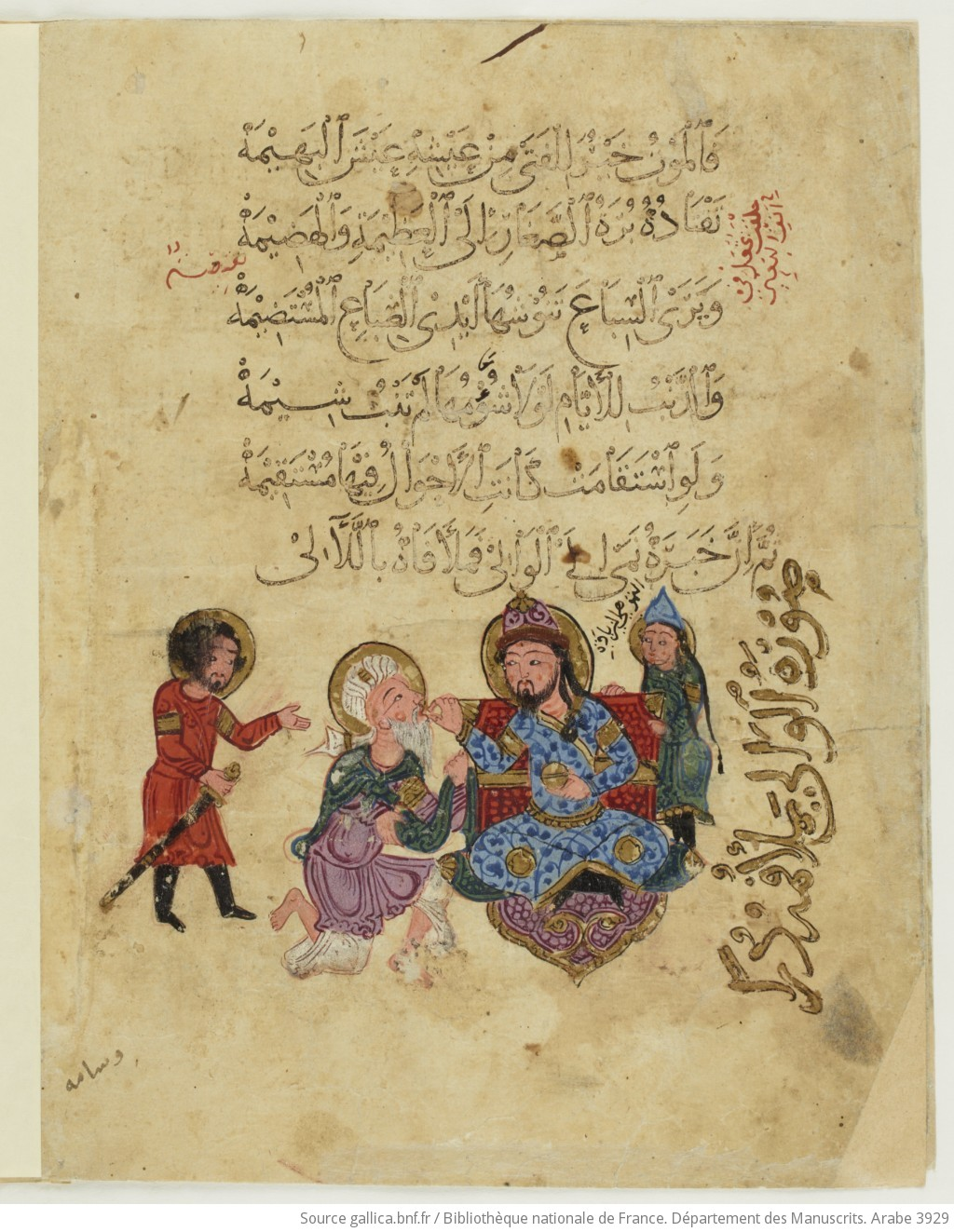
Maqama 06: Abu Zayd gratified by the Governor of Maraghah. Arabe 3929, 7v

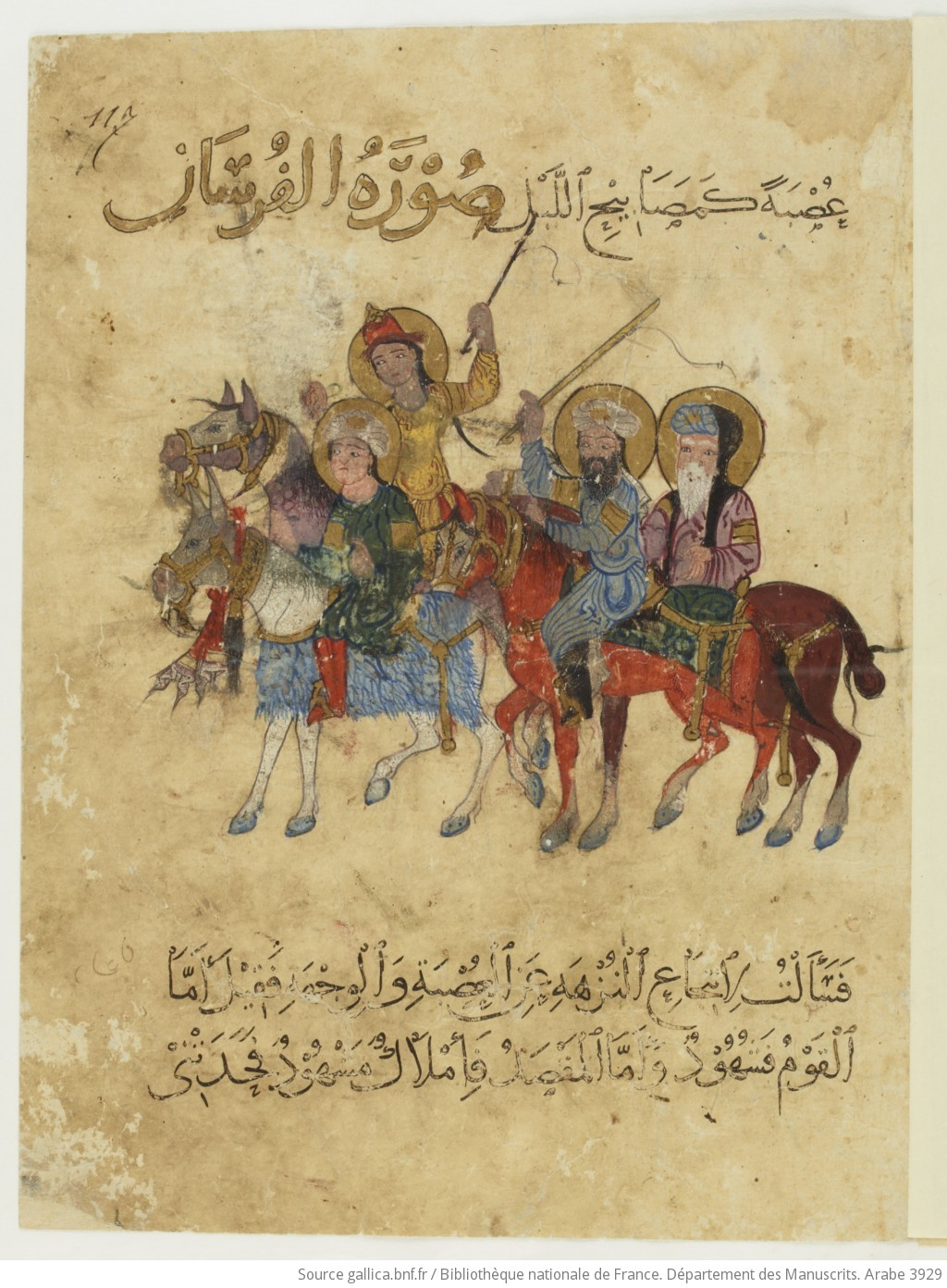
Maqama 30: Marriage procession. Arabe 3929, 117r

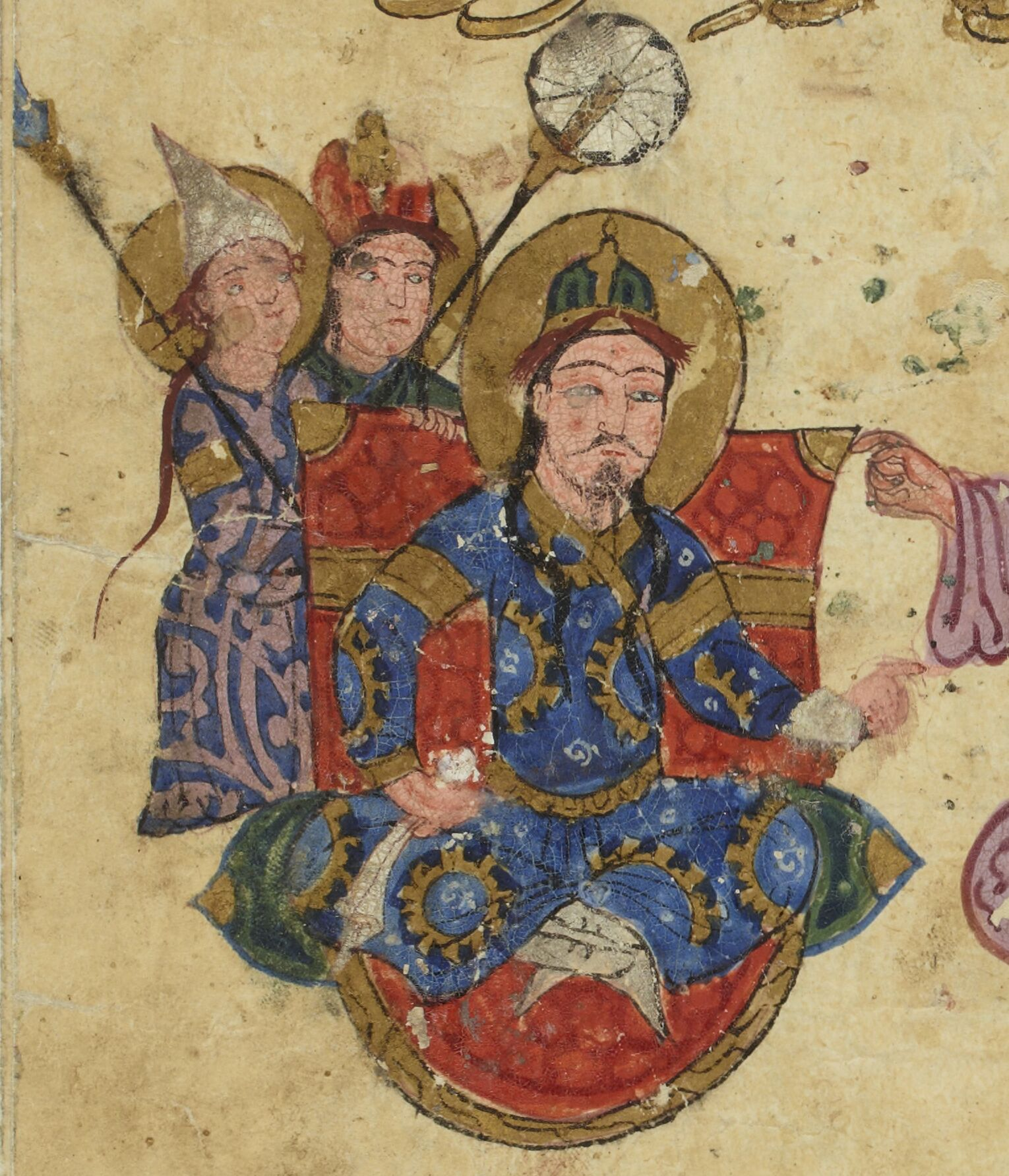
Maqama 43: the Sheikh of Diyar Bakr in Turkic dress, wearing the sharbūsh with tall cap. Maqamat 43, Arabe 3929, 157r.

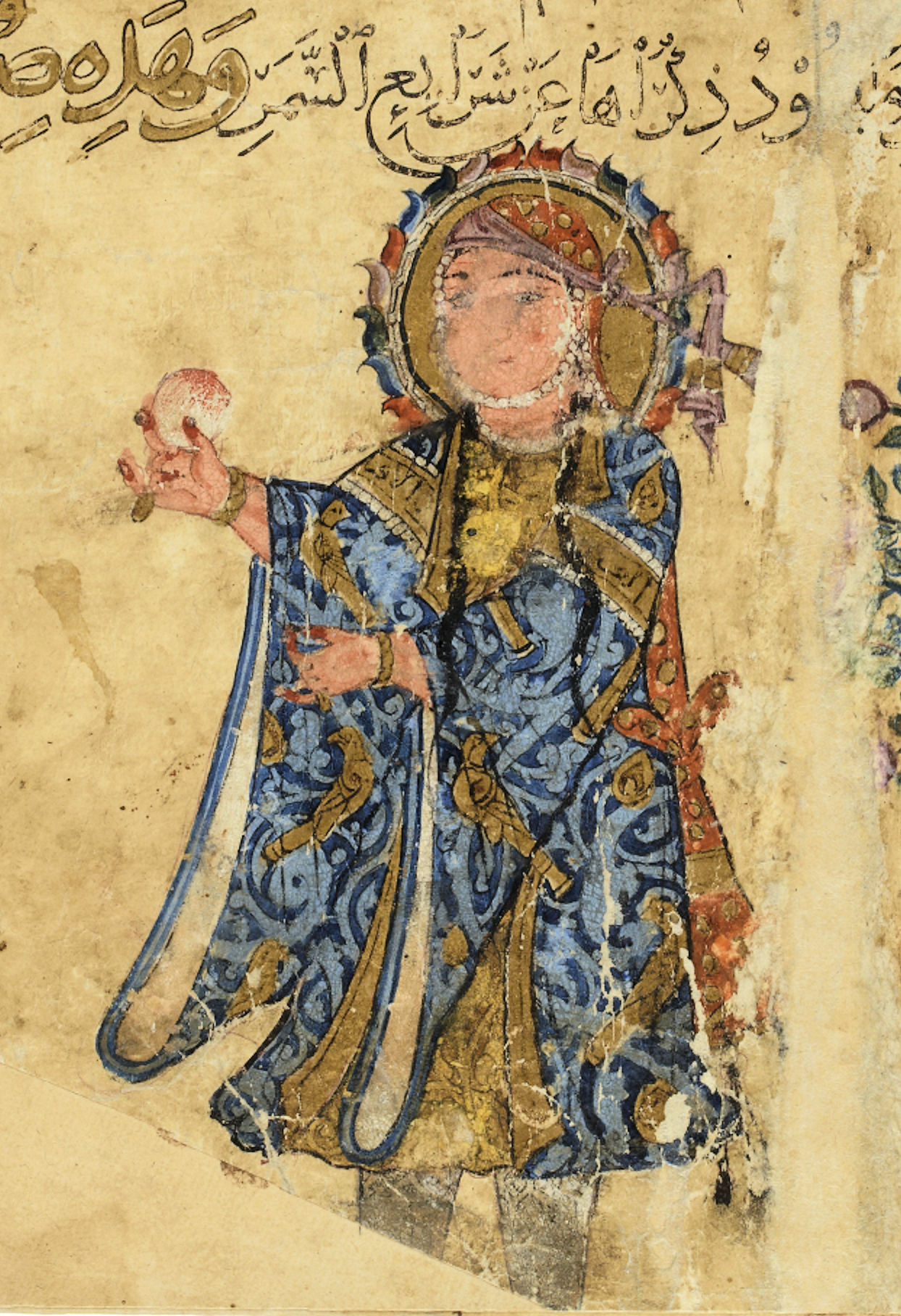
Maqama 18: the beautiful slave maiden of Abu Zaid, a "jāriya".

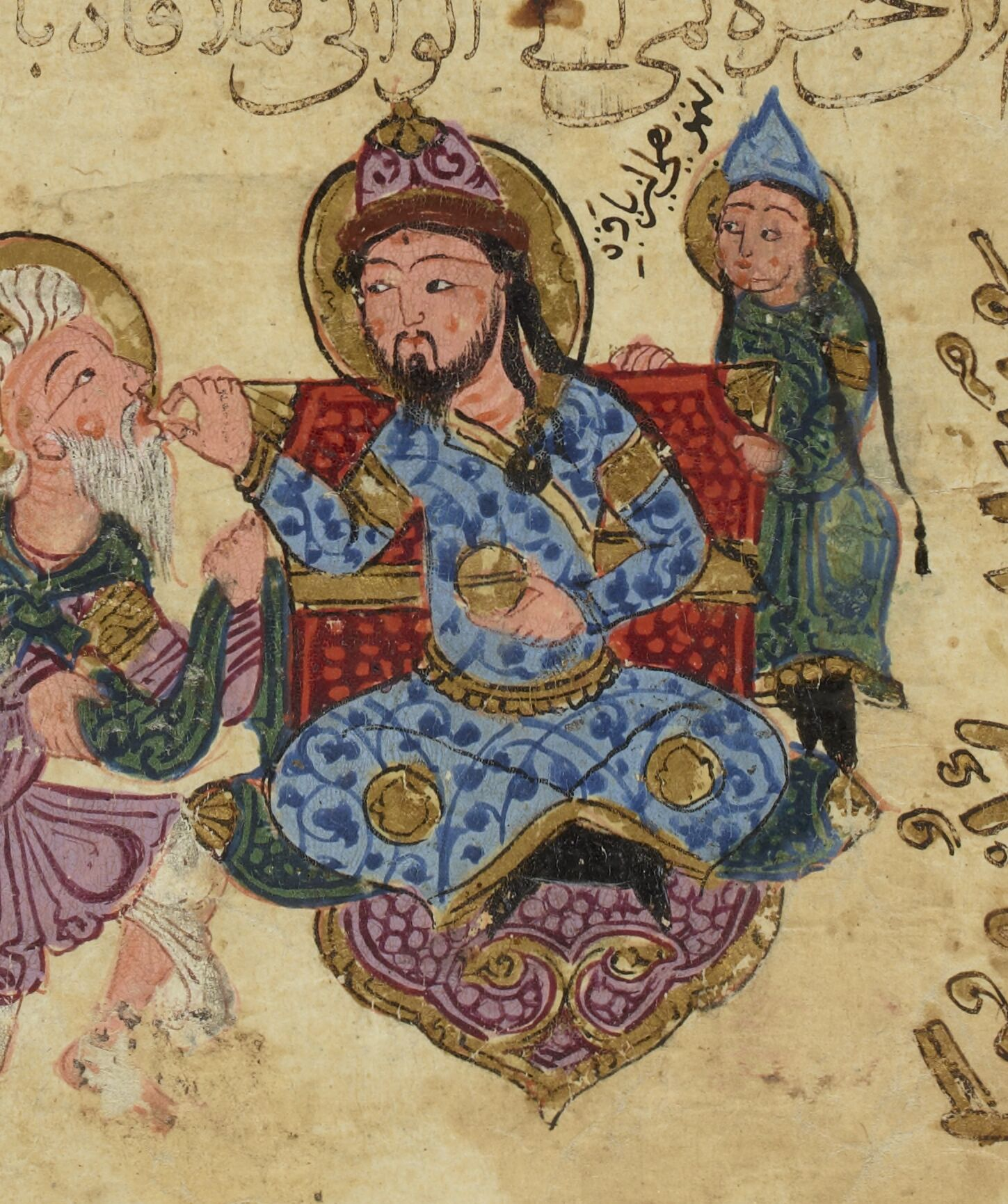
Maqama 06: the Governor of Maraghah in Iran

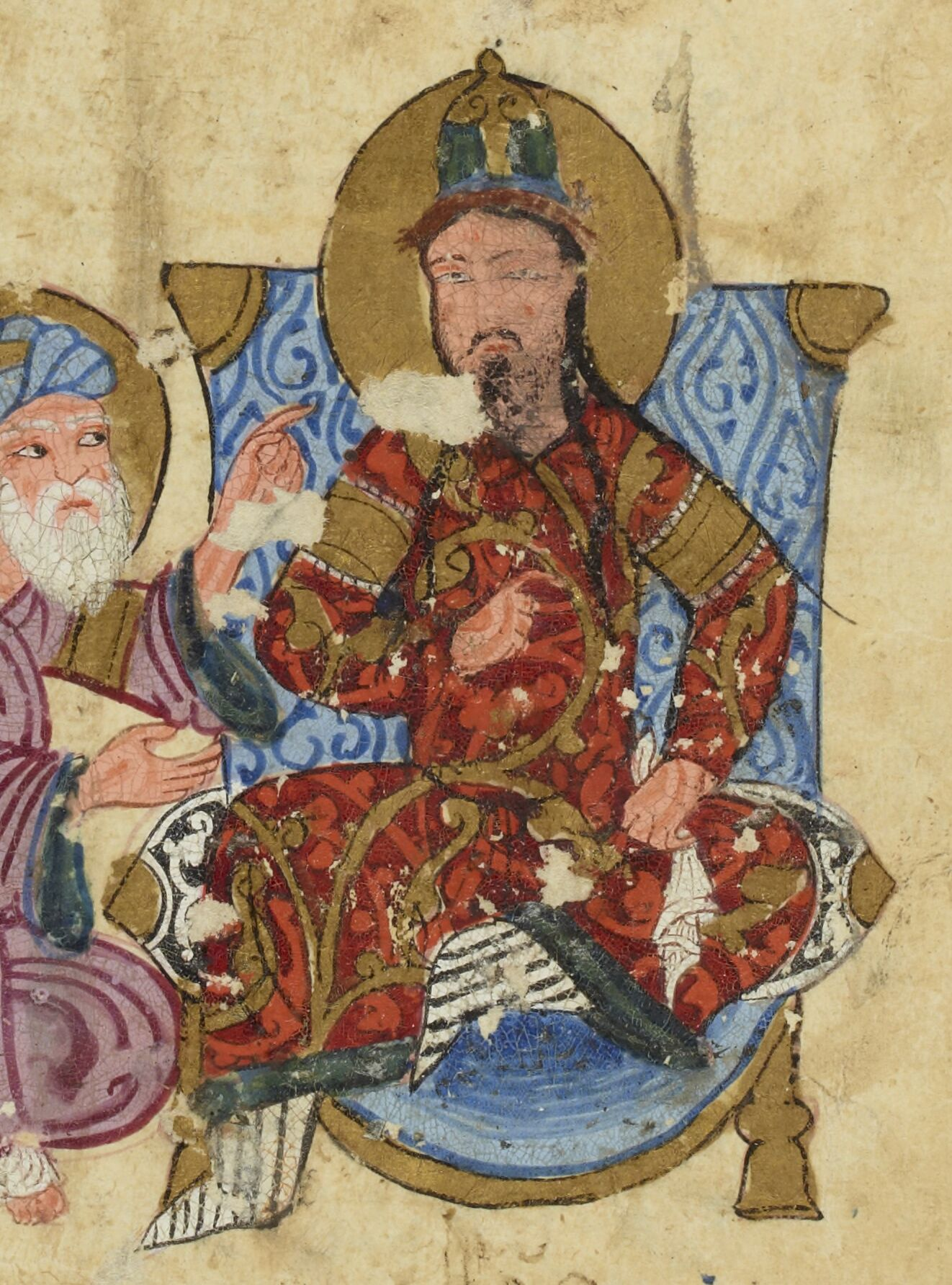
Maqama 38: the Governor of Merv, Iran

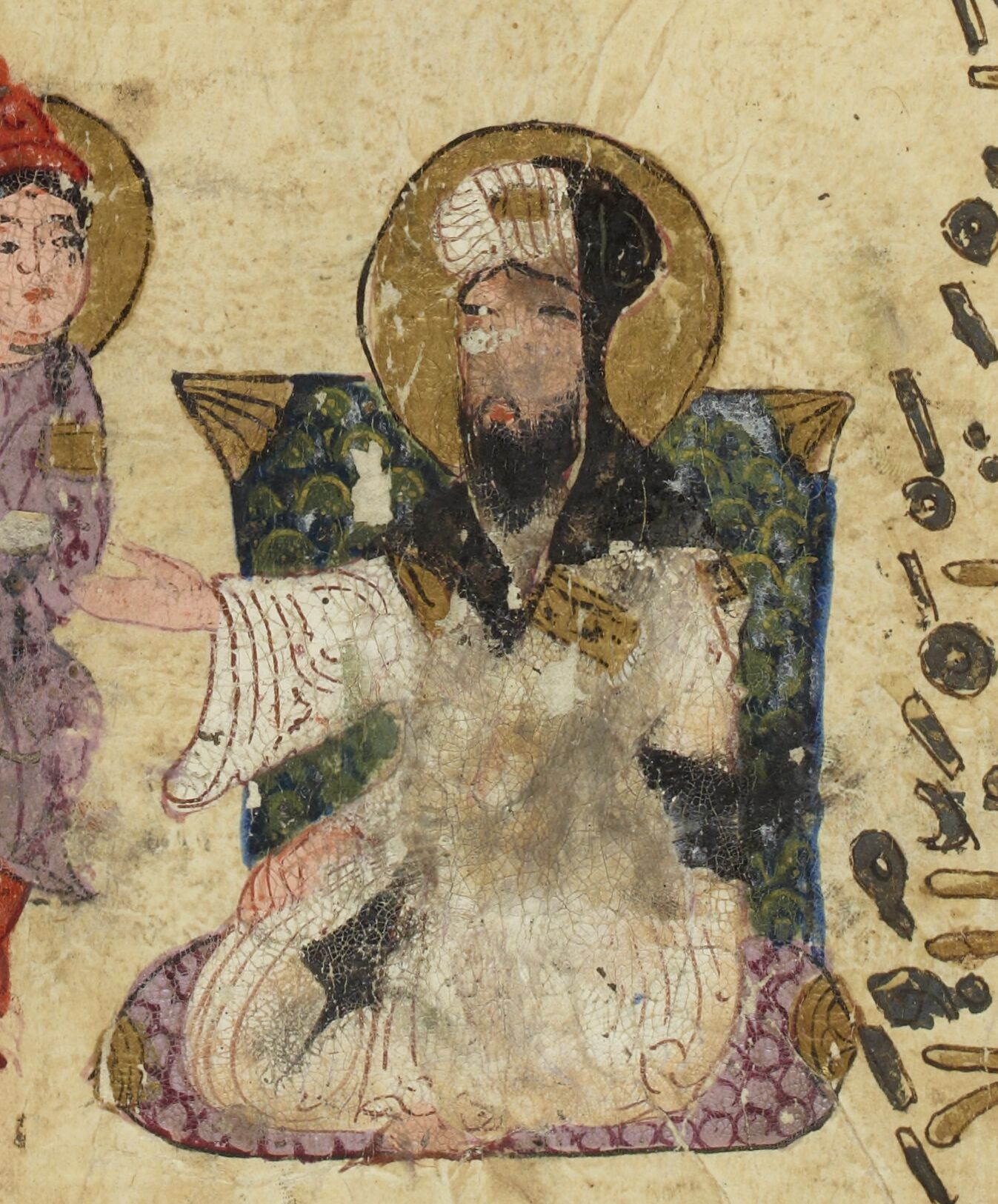
Maqama 37: the Qadi of Sa'dah in Yemen

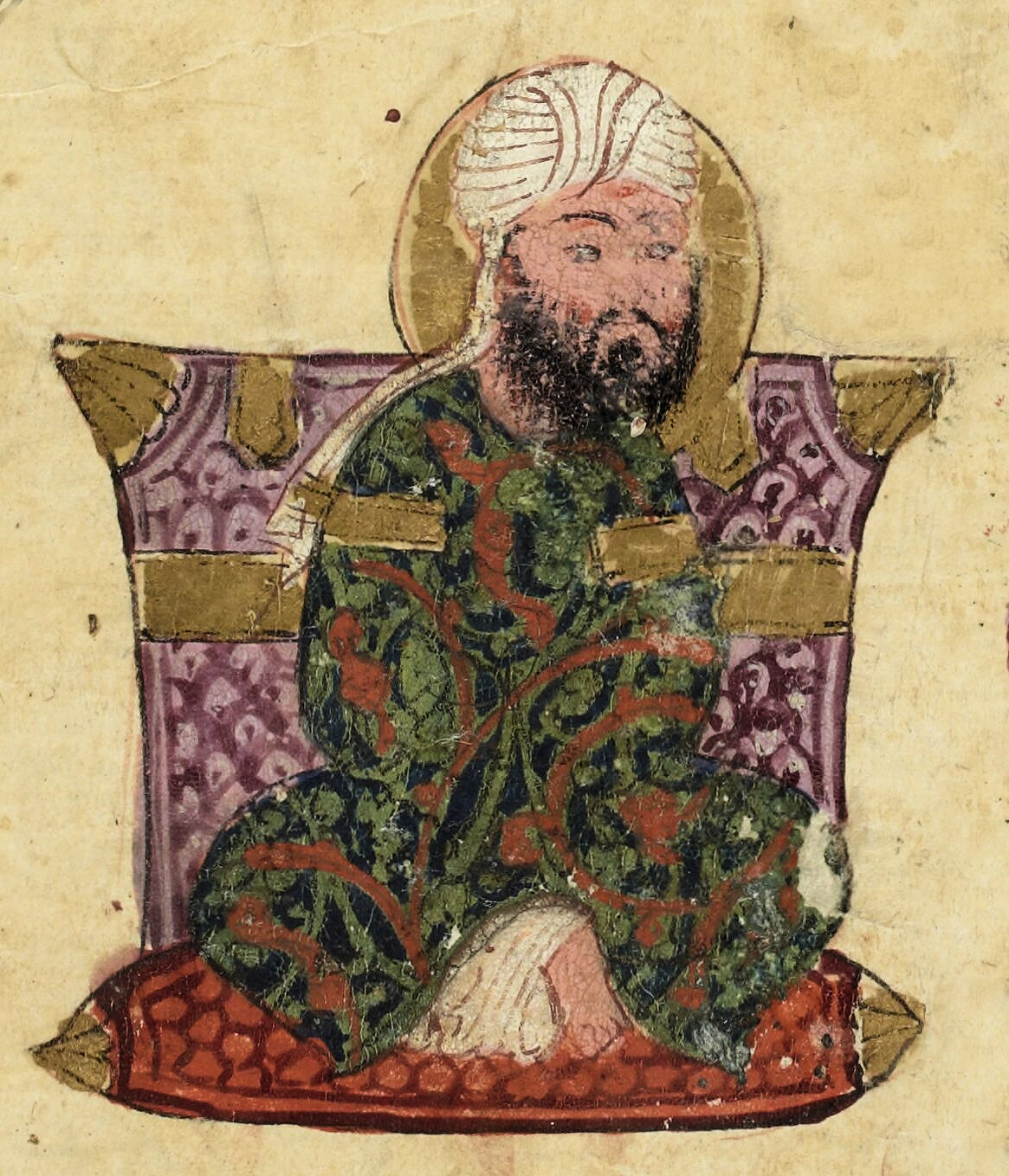
Maqama 09: the Qadi of Alexandria in Egypt

==== Paris, Bibliothèque Nationale de France, Arabe 6094 (1222) ====
Arabe 6094 was made in the Jazira region, and is the earliest securely dated illustrated Maqāmāt by al-Hariri. The style and numerous Byzantine inspirations in the illustrations suggest it might have been drawn in the area of Damascus in Syria, under the rule of the Ayyubids. The date appears in several places (on the hull of the boat in folio 68, or a plate held by a schoolboy in folio 167, in the format "made in the year 619" (i.e. 1222 CE).

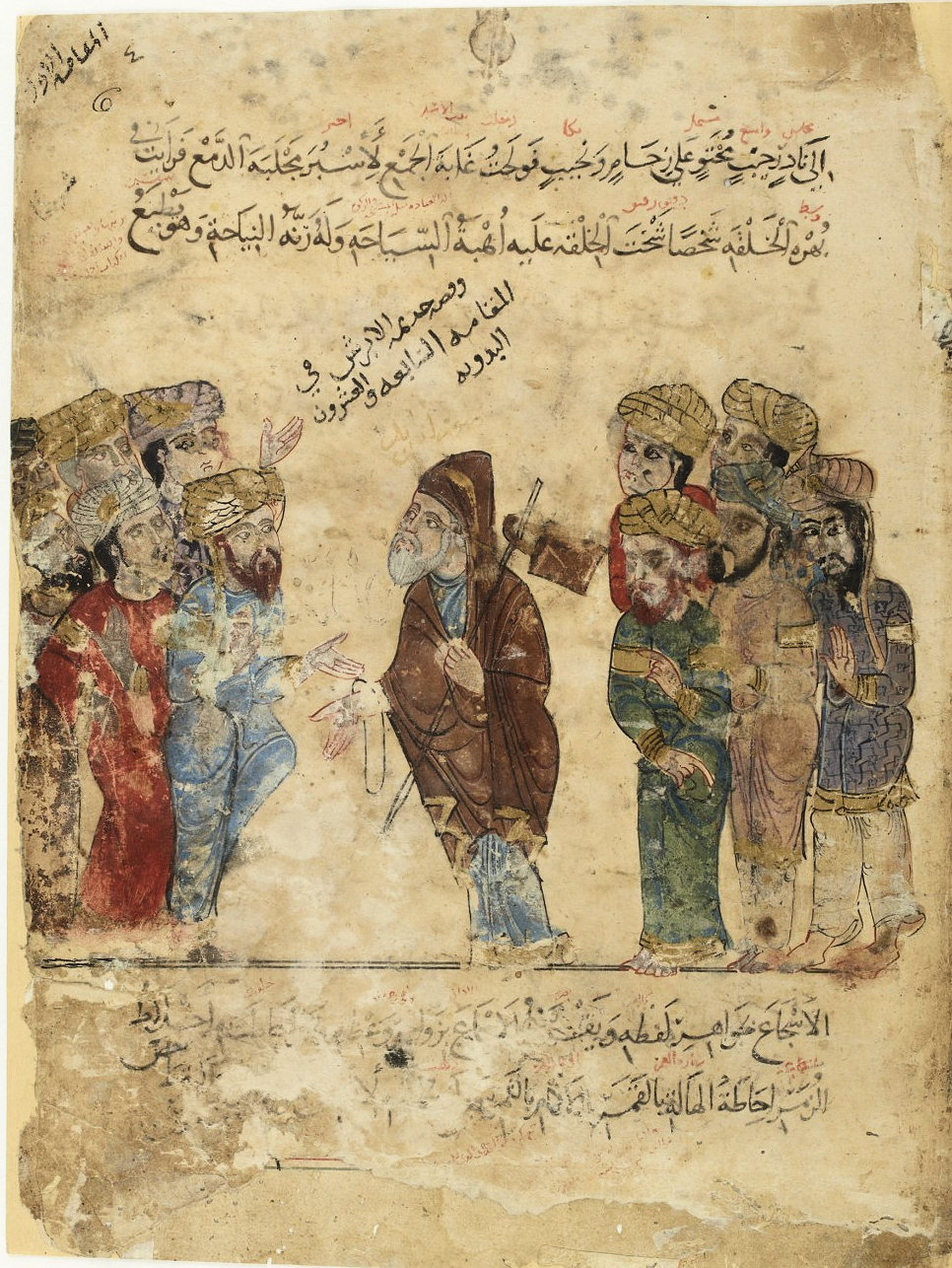
Mqama 01: Abu Zayd and listeners in San'a. Folio 6r

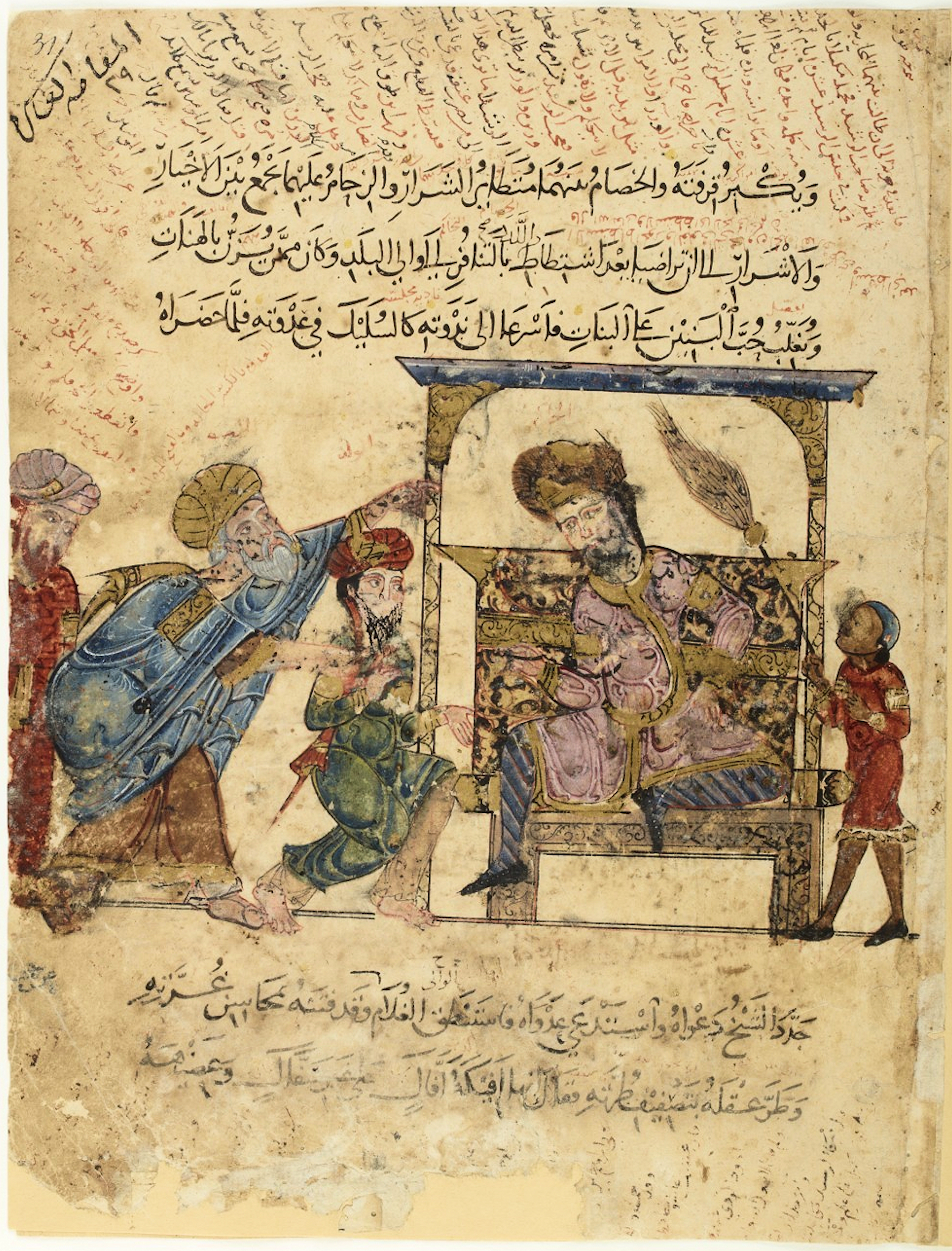
Maqama 10: Abu Zayd and his son before the governor of Rabba. 1222, folio 31r

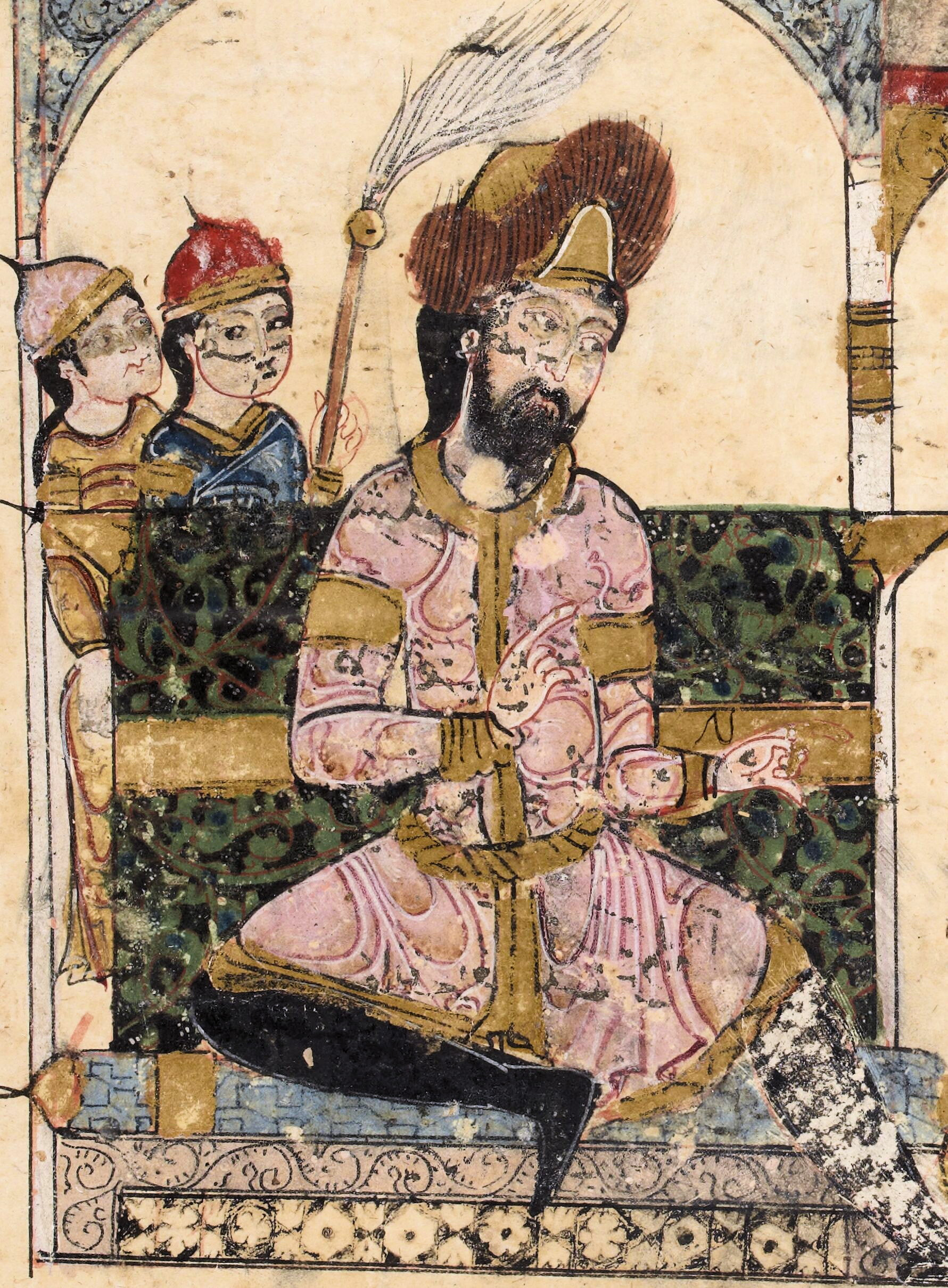
Maqama 38: the Governor of Merv, wearing the Turkic sharbūsh.

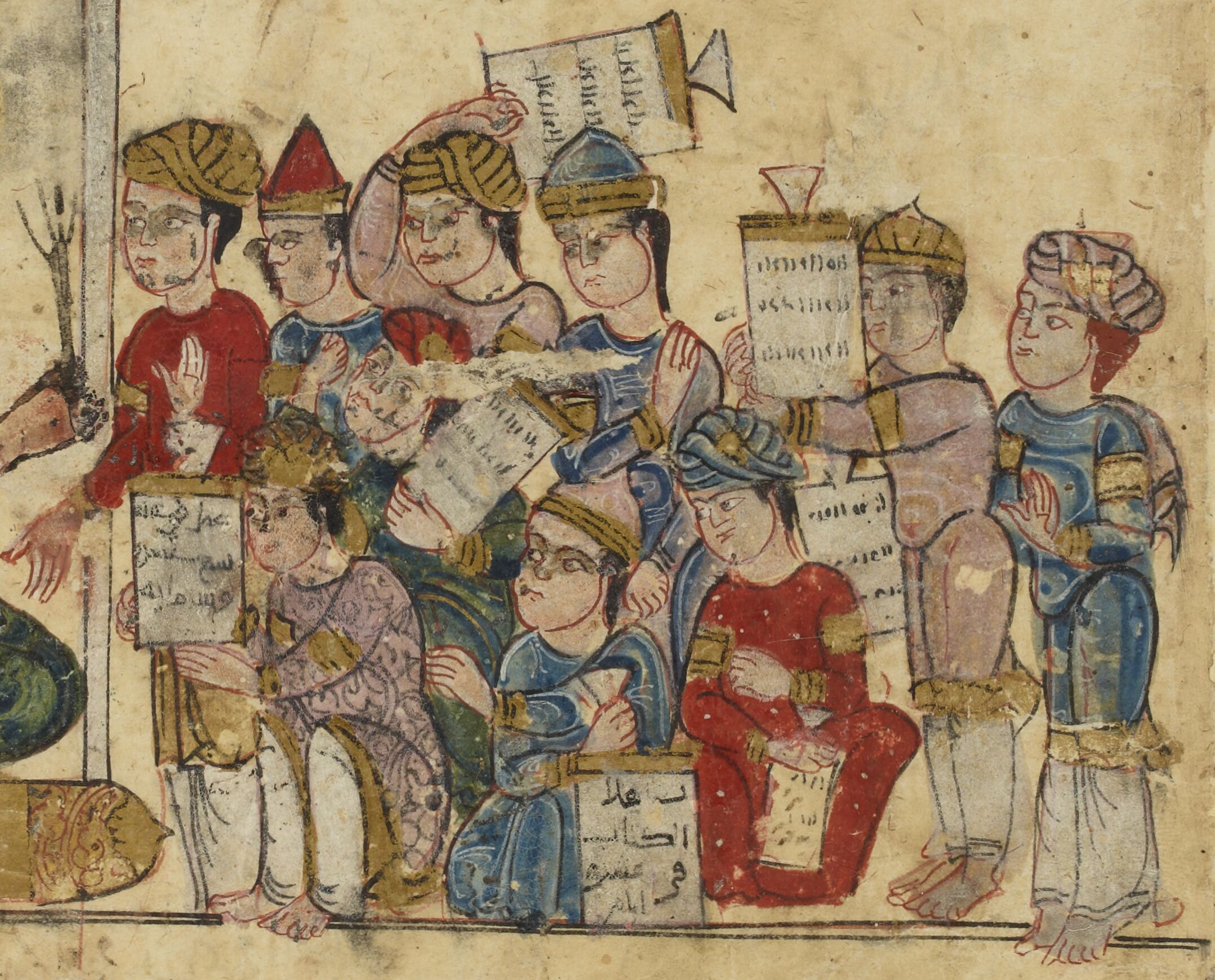
Maqama 46: Abu Zayd teacher in Aleppo. Students, some wearing the Arab turban, others Turkic caps. Folio 167r

==== Paris, Bibliothèque Nationale de France, Arabe 5847 (1237) ====
Arabe 5847, also known as the Schefer Ḥarīrī, is a copy created by Yahya ibn Mahmūd al-Wāsitī and is probably the most applauded copy of the Maqāmāt. According to its colophon, the manuscript was copied in the year 634 AH (1237 CE). It may have been created in Baghdad, based on some stylistic parallels with the Kitab al-baytarah, which securely emanated from this city, and the fact that the name of the Abbasid Caliph al-Mustansir appears in one of the paintings (15th maqama, fol. 164v); but this attribution remains quite conjectural. The Bibliothèque Nationale de France, holder of the manuscript, simply presents it as "Mesopotamian".

The twin frontispieces show one individual in Arab dress, who may be the author himself, and a majestic ruler in Seljuk-type Turkic military dress (long braids, fur hat, boots, fitting coat), who may be the potentate the manuscript was dedicated to. This potentate seems like a Turkic emir, and may be one of the Atabegs who ruled in the region, particularly Badr al-Din Lu'lu', who ruled in the Mosul region and Upper Mesopotamia with the approval of the Abbasid caliph at the time.

The book is written in red and black ink, and supplemented by 99 miniatures. These miniatures depict a wide variety of scenes from the Maqāmāt and from everyday life. Most are decorated with gold.

This Maqamat is particularly noted for its ability to depict various "types", according to they ethnic or social characteristics. Officials and "men of the sword" wear the sharbush hat, coat and boots, and are often armed with a spear, reflecting Turkic styles. "Men of the pen" such as judges, literary figures, musicians or merchants wear turbans, tunic and baggy trousers, with low black shoes, reflecting Arab practices. The few women in the manuscript often wear veils and have henna markings on their hands. Servants and slaves are often scantily clothed and tend to have darker skin.

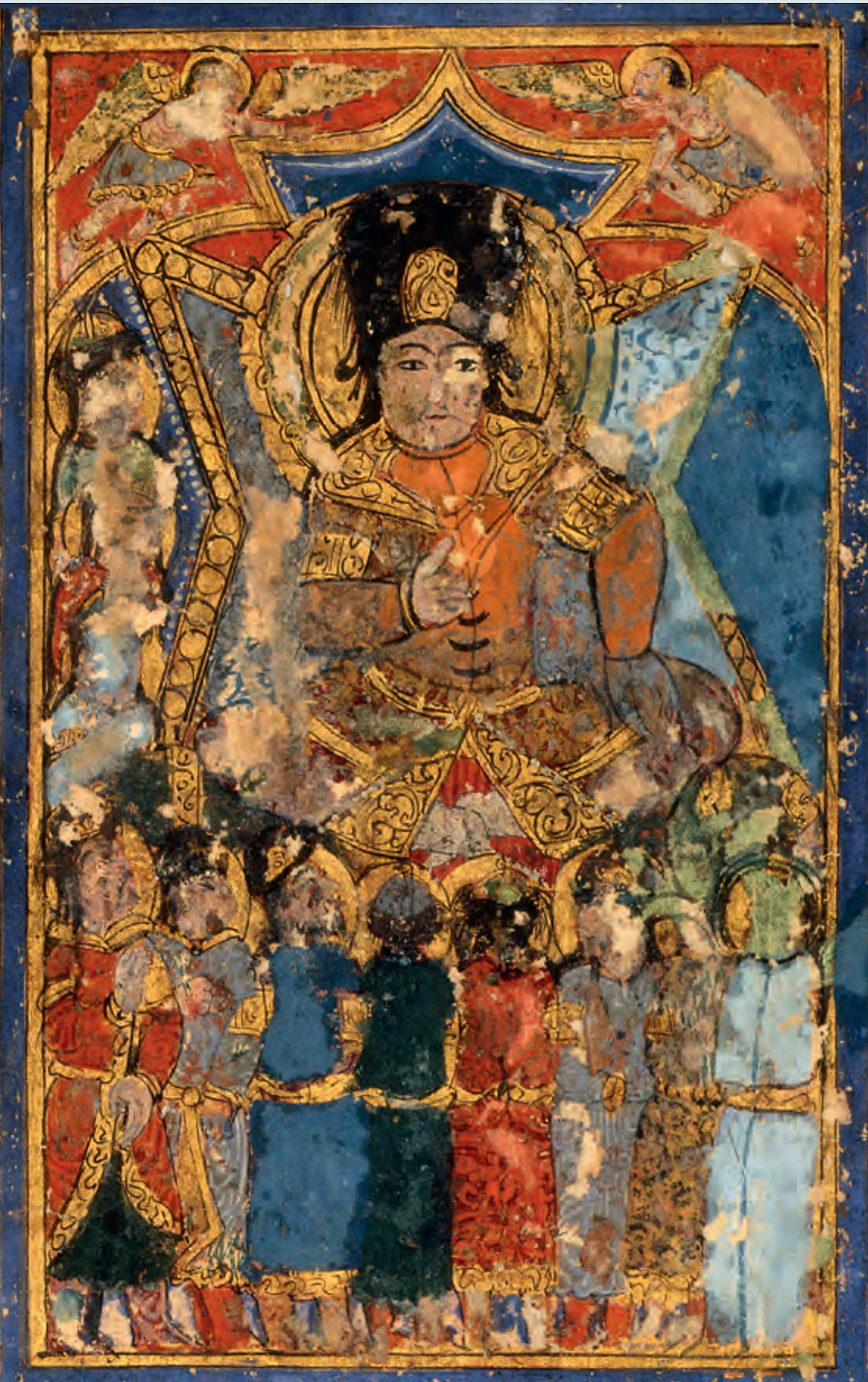
Left frontispiece (1v): ruler in Turkic dress (long braids, Sharbush fur hat, boots, fitting coat), in the Maqamat of al-Hariri, 1237 CE, possibly Baghdad.

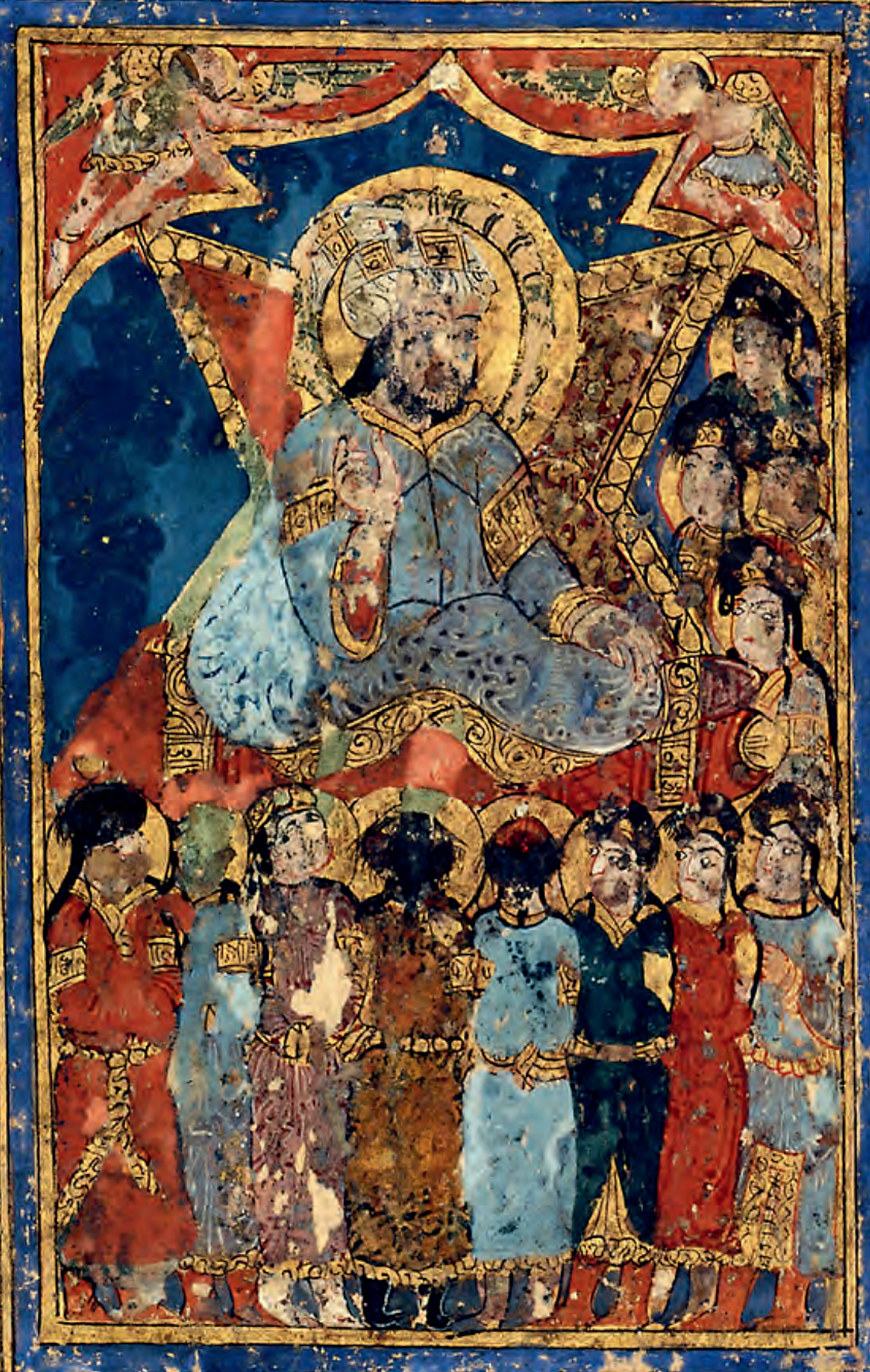
Right frontispiece (2r): possible depiction of the author al-Hariri himself, in the Maqamat of al-Hariri, 1237 CE, possibly Baghdad.

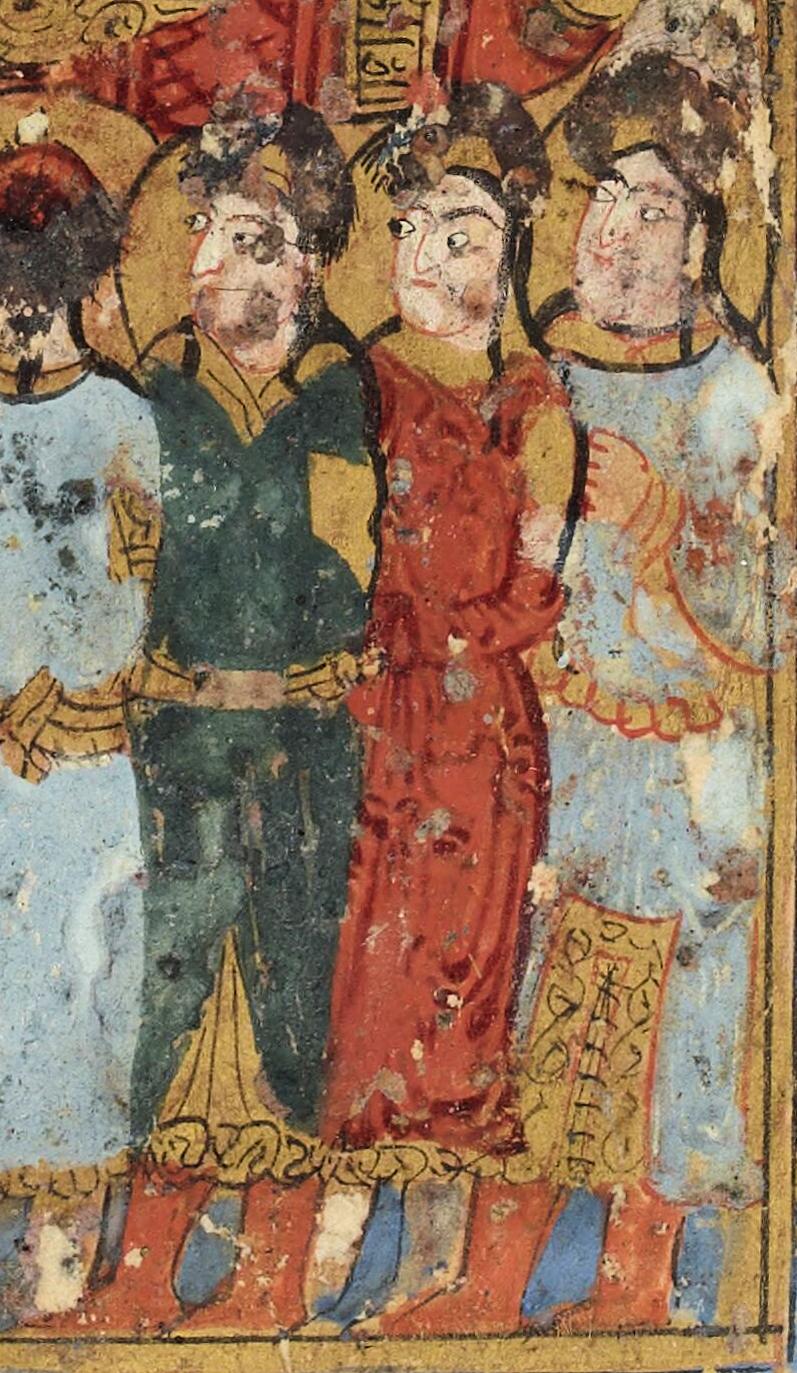
Turkic soldiers wearing the aqbiya turkiyya coat, tiraz armbands, boots and sharbush hat. (Second frontispiece detail)

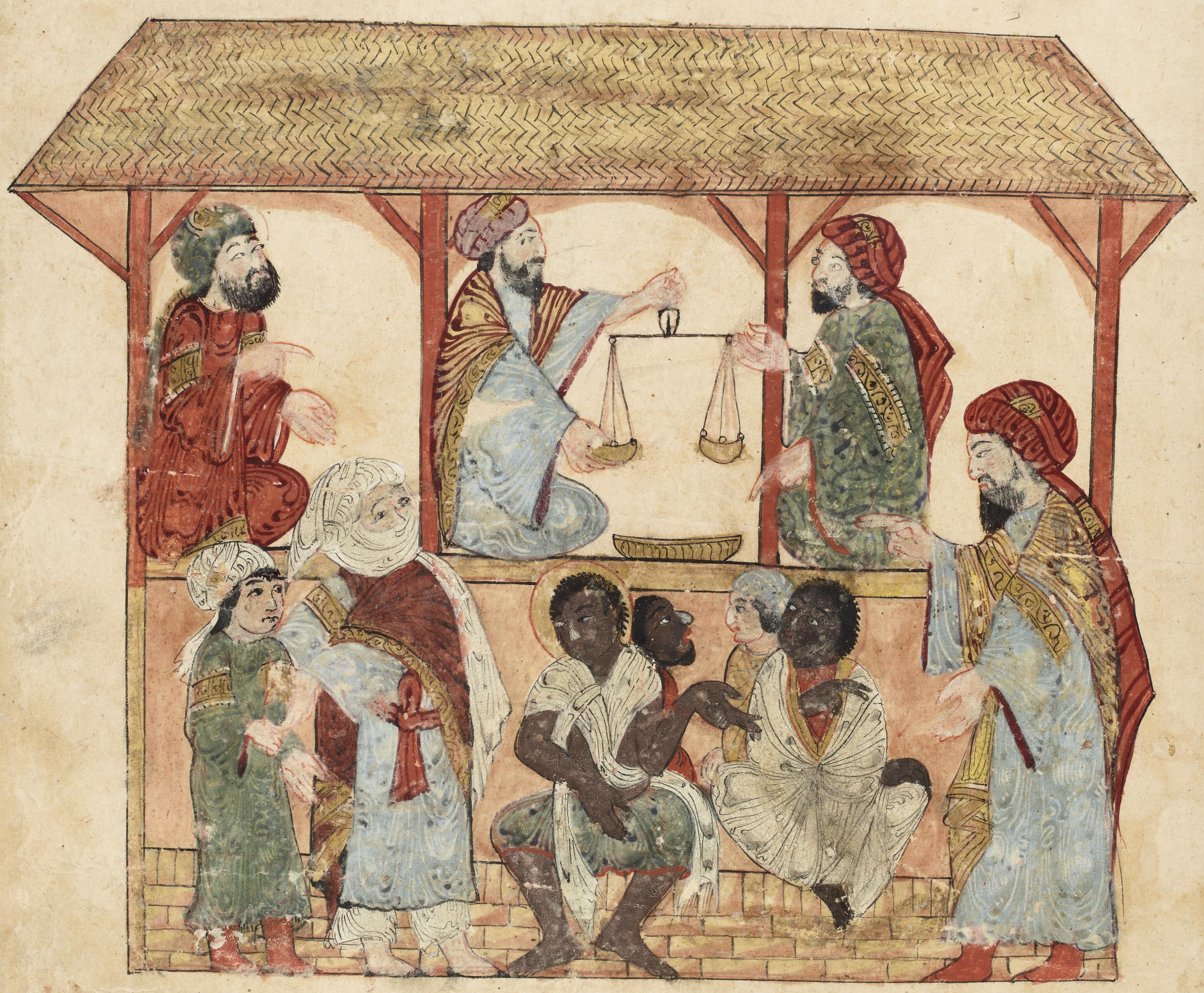
Maqama 34: Slave-market in the town of Zabid in Yemen

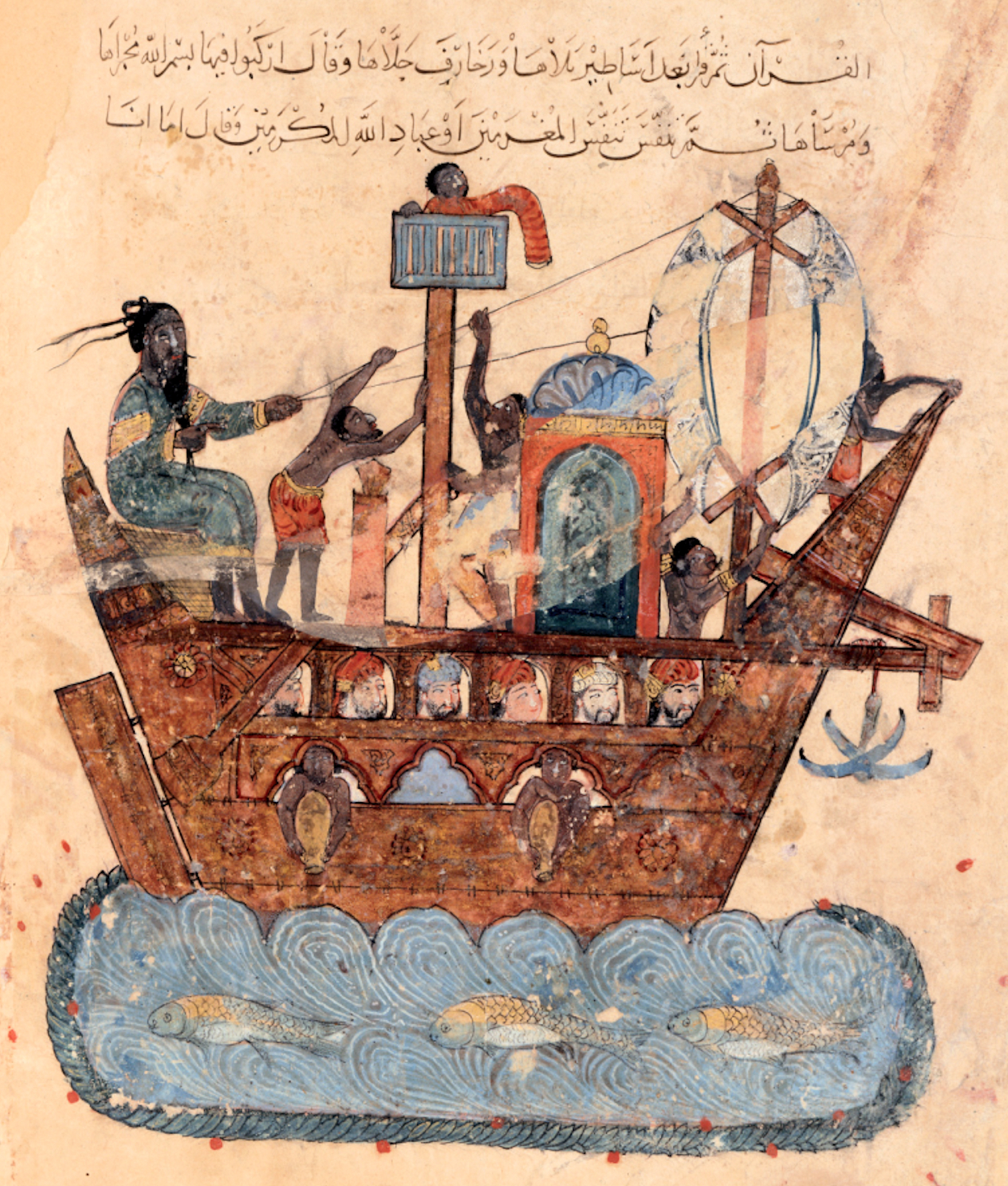
Maqama 39: A ship bound for Oman.

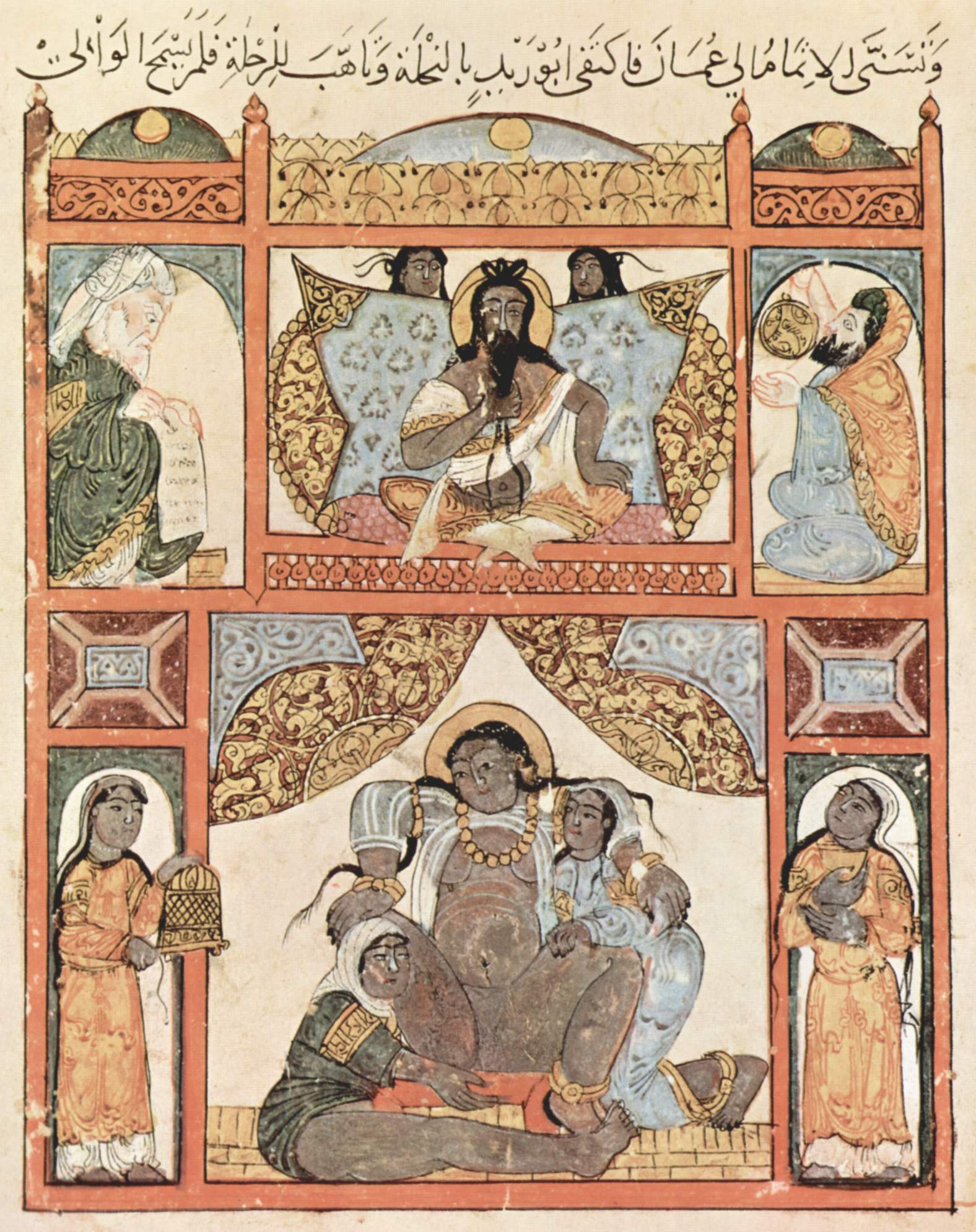
Maqama 39: the Queen of Oman giving birth.

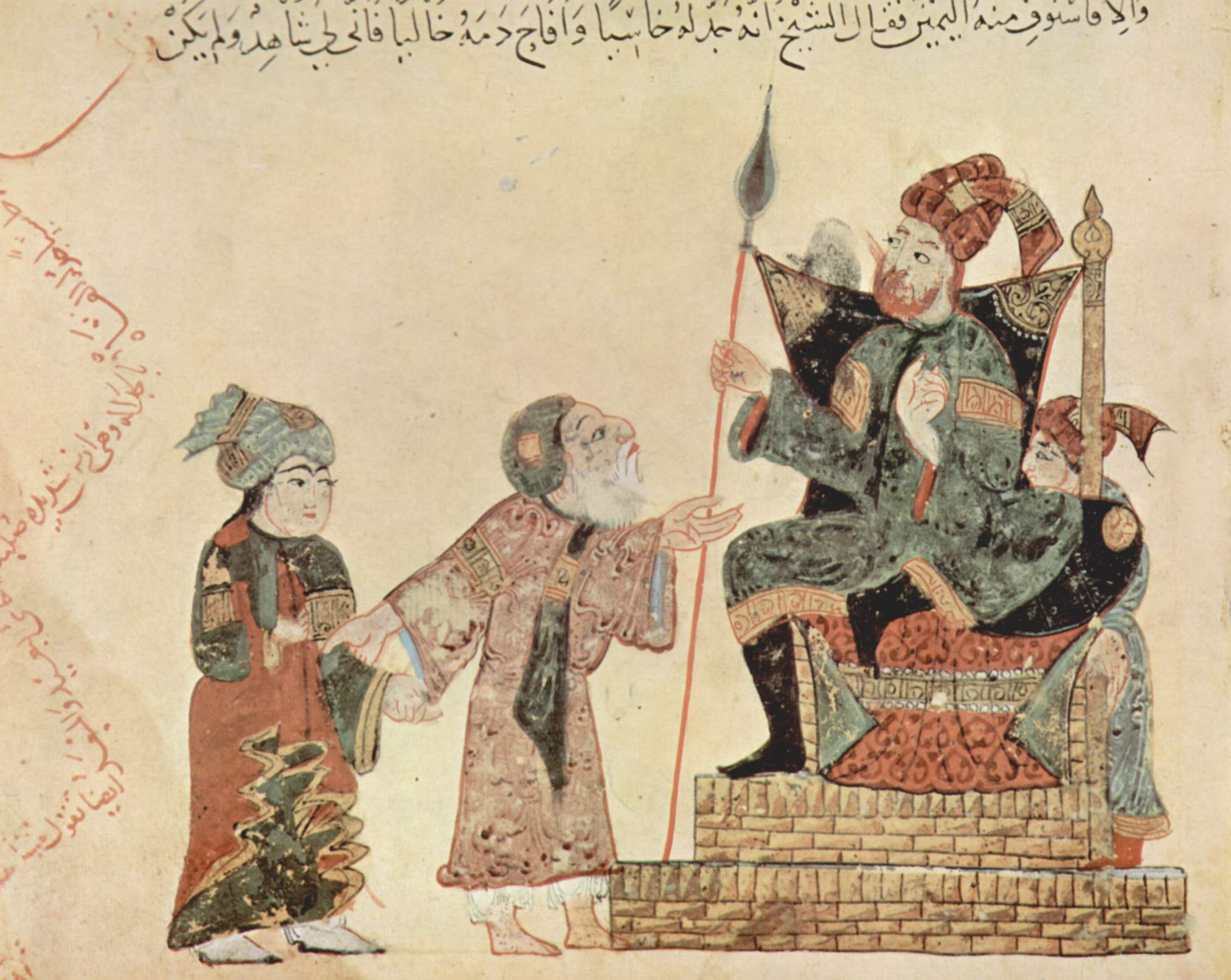
Maqama 10: Ayyubid Governor of Rahba, with Abū Zayd and his son.

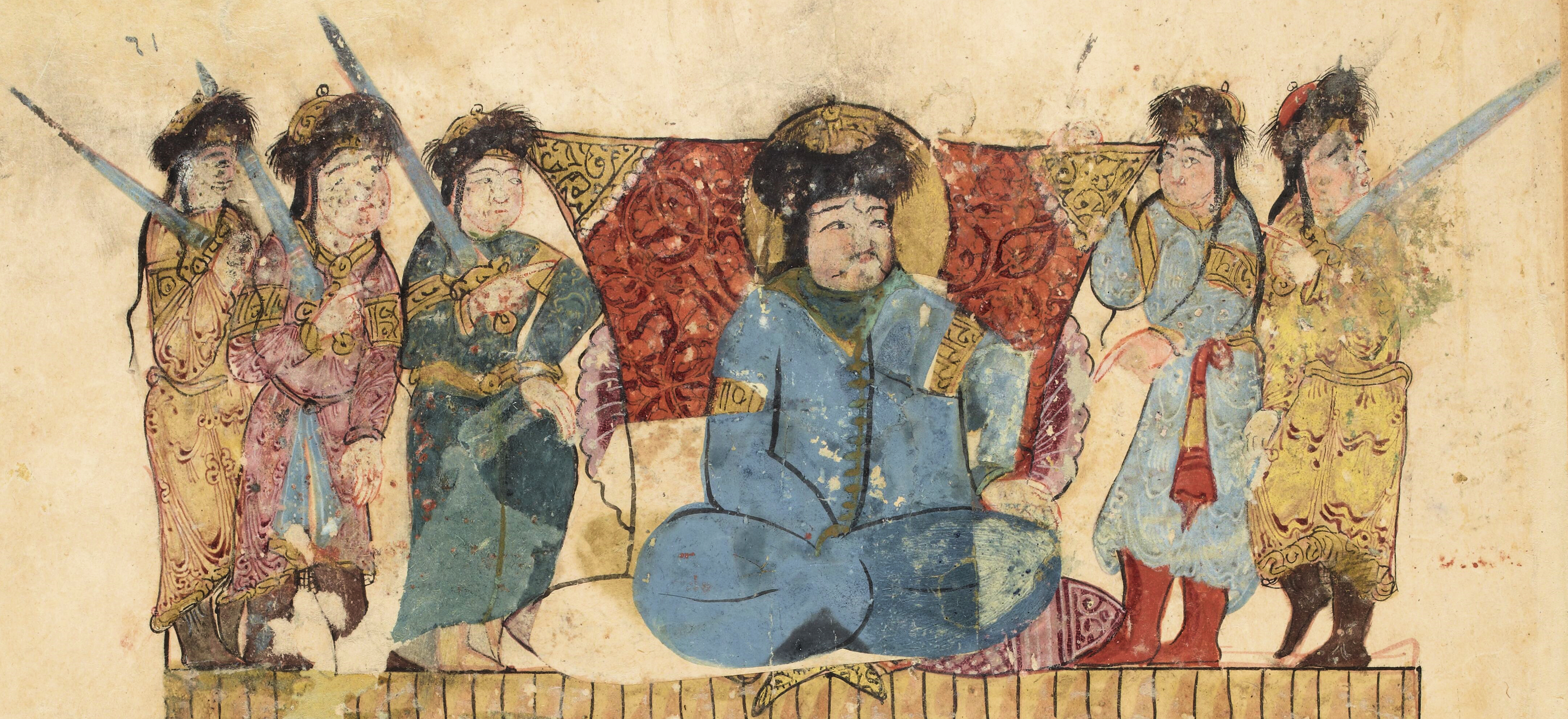
Maqama 21: Amir ("the Prince of that region") with guards, wearing the Turkic headgear Sharbush, in the preaching scene at Rayy, Iran,

==== Istanbul, Suleymaniye Library, Esad Efendi 2961 (1242-1258) ====
This manuscript is badly damaged and all the faces were erased. Its colophon bears a dedication to Abbasid Caliph Al-Musta'sim (1243–1258), but the location of its production is unknown.

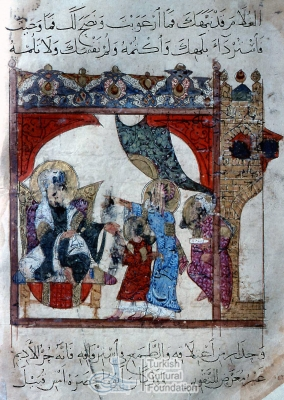
Suleymaniye Library, Esad Efendi 2916

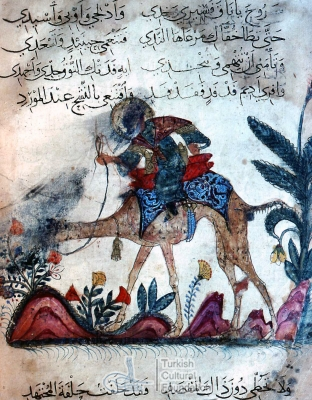
Suleymaniye Library, Esad Efendi 2916

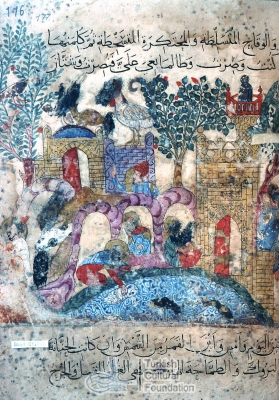
Suleymaniye Library, Esad Efendi 2916

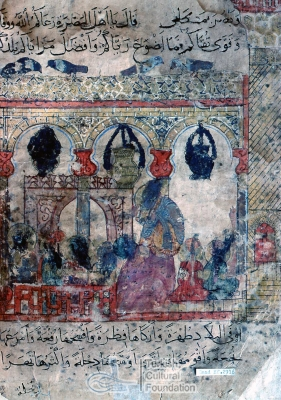
Suleymaniye Library, Esad Efendi 2916

==== London, British Library, Or 1200 (1256) ====
This manuscript has a colophon describing the date of its manufacture as 1256. It was made by an artist named Umar ibn Ali ibn al-Mubarak al-Mawsili ("from Mosul"). The manuscript is quite damaged, and miniatures often have been clumsily repainted.

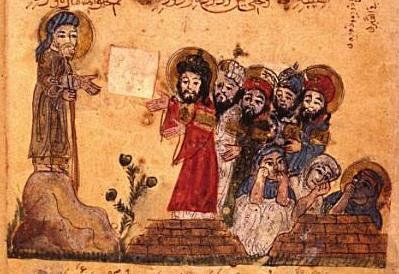
British Library, Ms. Or. 1200

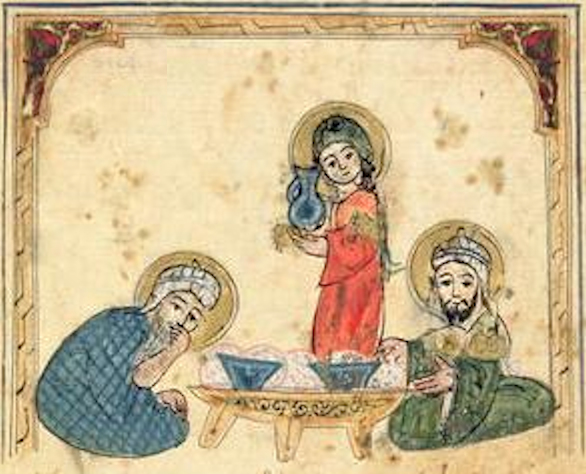
British Library, Ms. Or. 1200

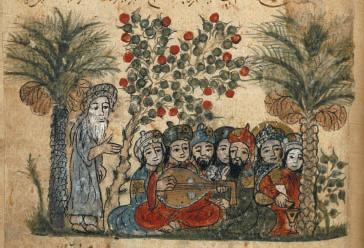
British Library, Ms. Or. 1200

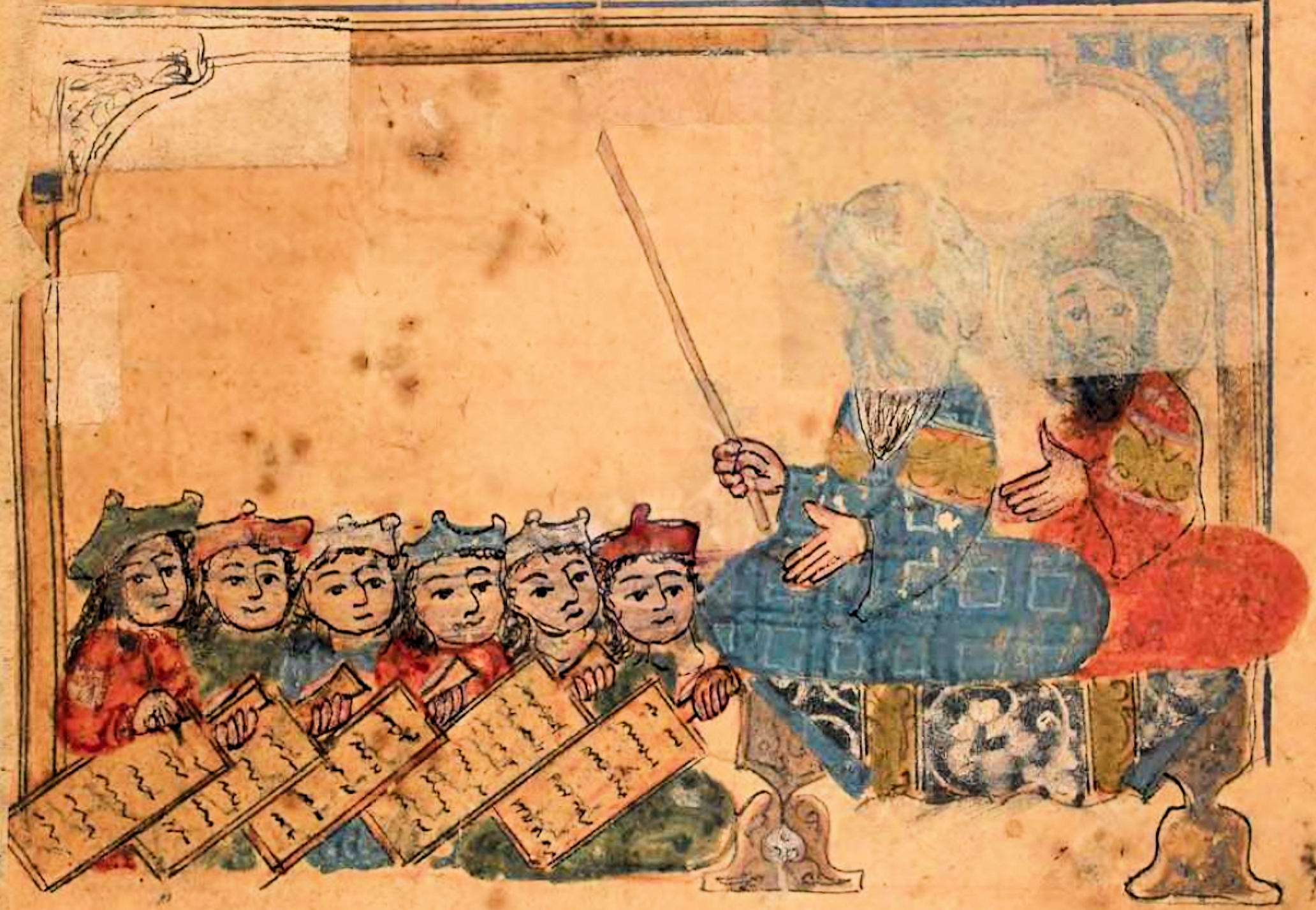
Abū Zayd in the children's school. British Library, Ms. Or. 1200

==== London, British Library, Ms. Or. 9718 (late 13th century) ====
The manuscript is quite damaged, and many of the miniatures were repainted in rather recent times. The original artist was from Damascus (folio 53r mentions "Work of Ghazi ibn 'Abd al-Rahman al-Dimashqi", who is known to have been born in 1232–3 and died in 1310 at the age of 80, and apparently lived in Damascus all his life).

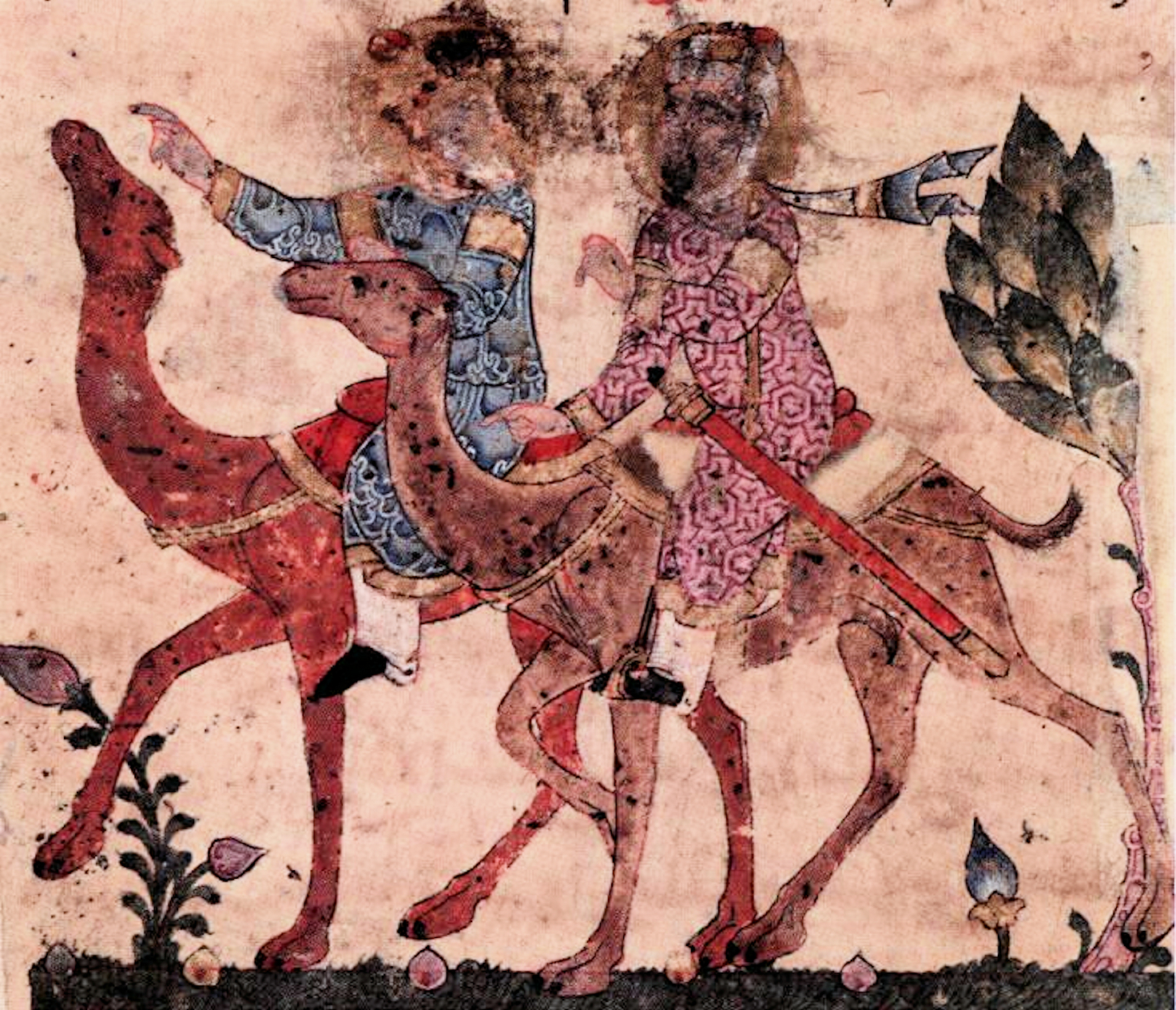
Two camel riders in Arab bedouin costumes. Maqamat, Syria, late 13th-century, British Library, Ms. Or. 9718.

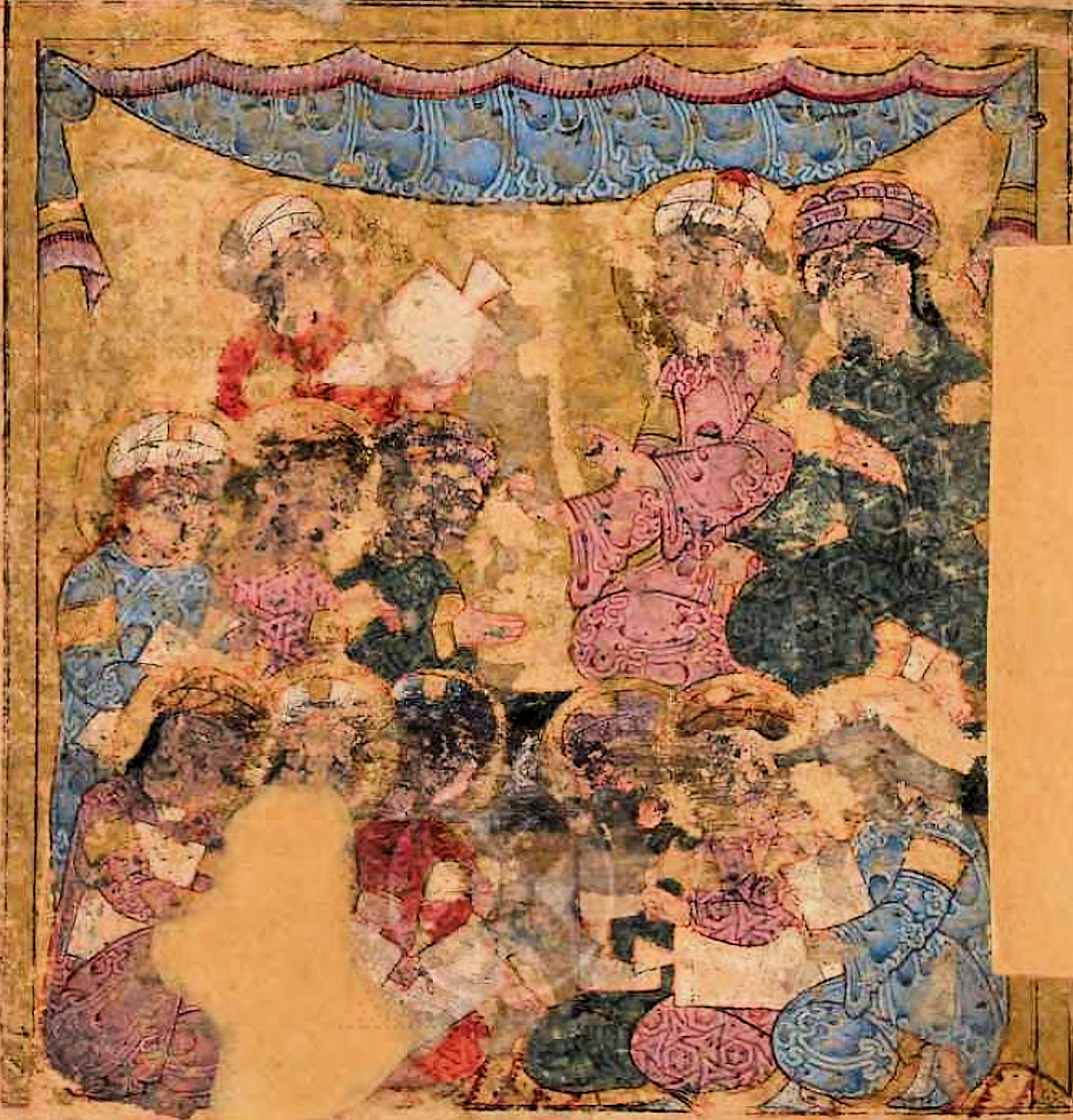
Abū Zayd in the children's school. British Library, Ms. Or. 9718.

==== Saint Petersburg, Russian Academy of Sciences, Ms. S.23 (13th century) ====
This manuscript (also sometimes labelled Ms. C-23), although in rather poor condition, has many elaborate illustrations. It is undated, and the place of origin is unknown.

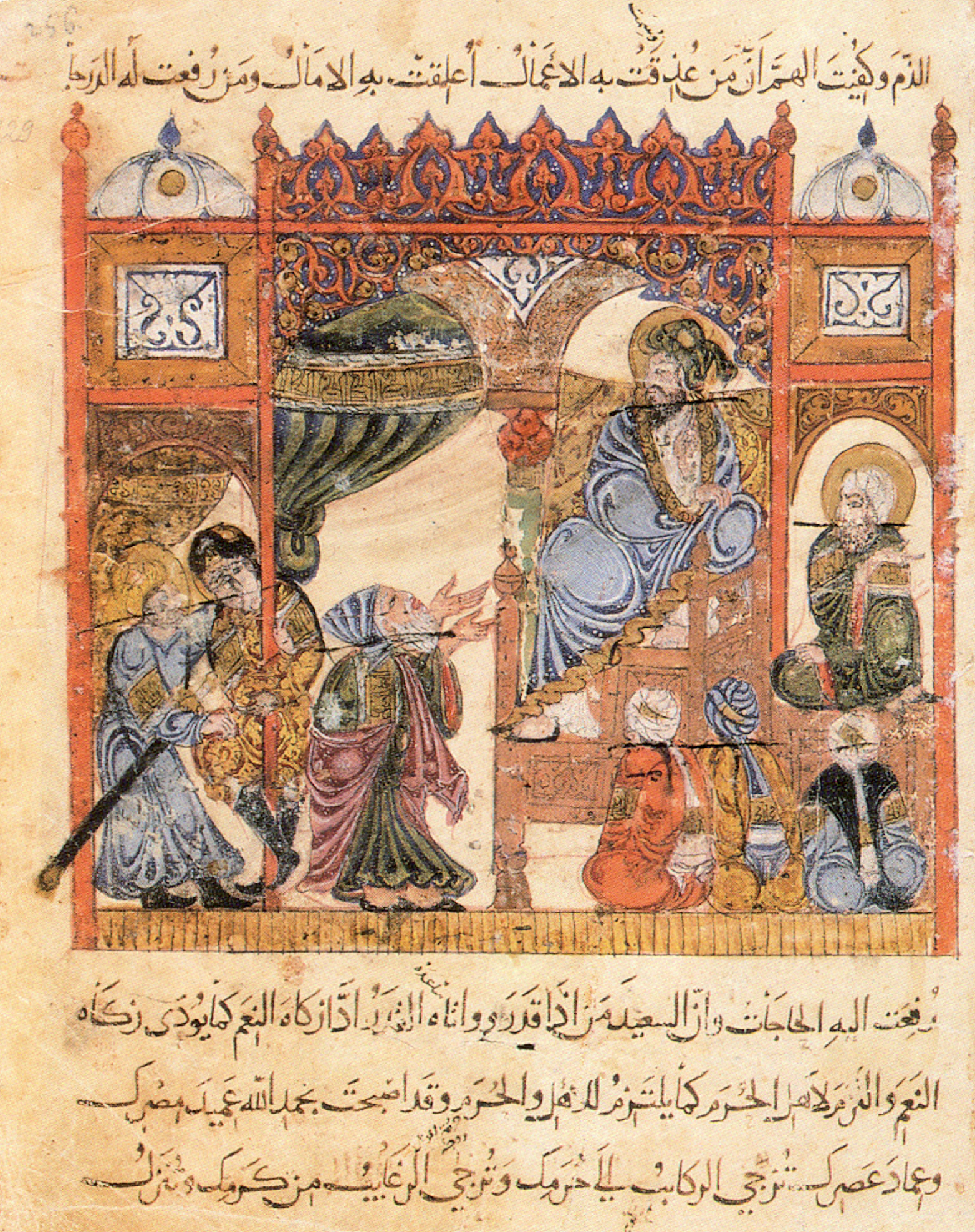
Abu Zayd before the governor of Merv (Maqāma 28). Saint Petersburg Ms. S.23.

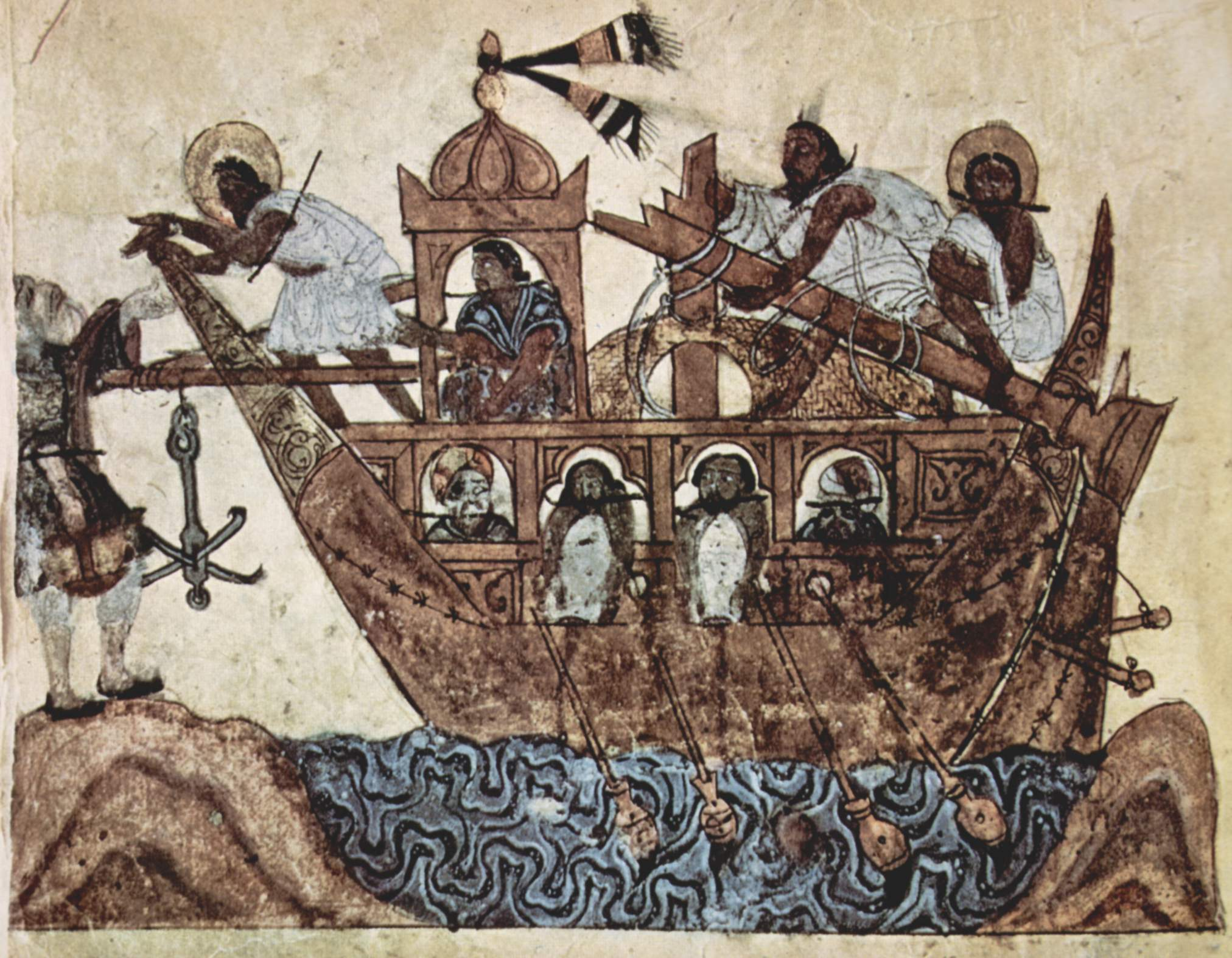
A ship bound for Oman (Maqāma 39). Saint Petersburg, Russian Academy of Sciences, Ms. S.23.

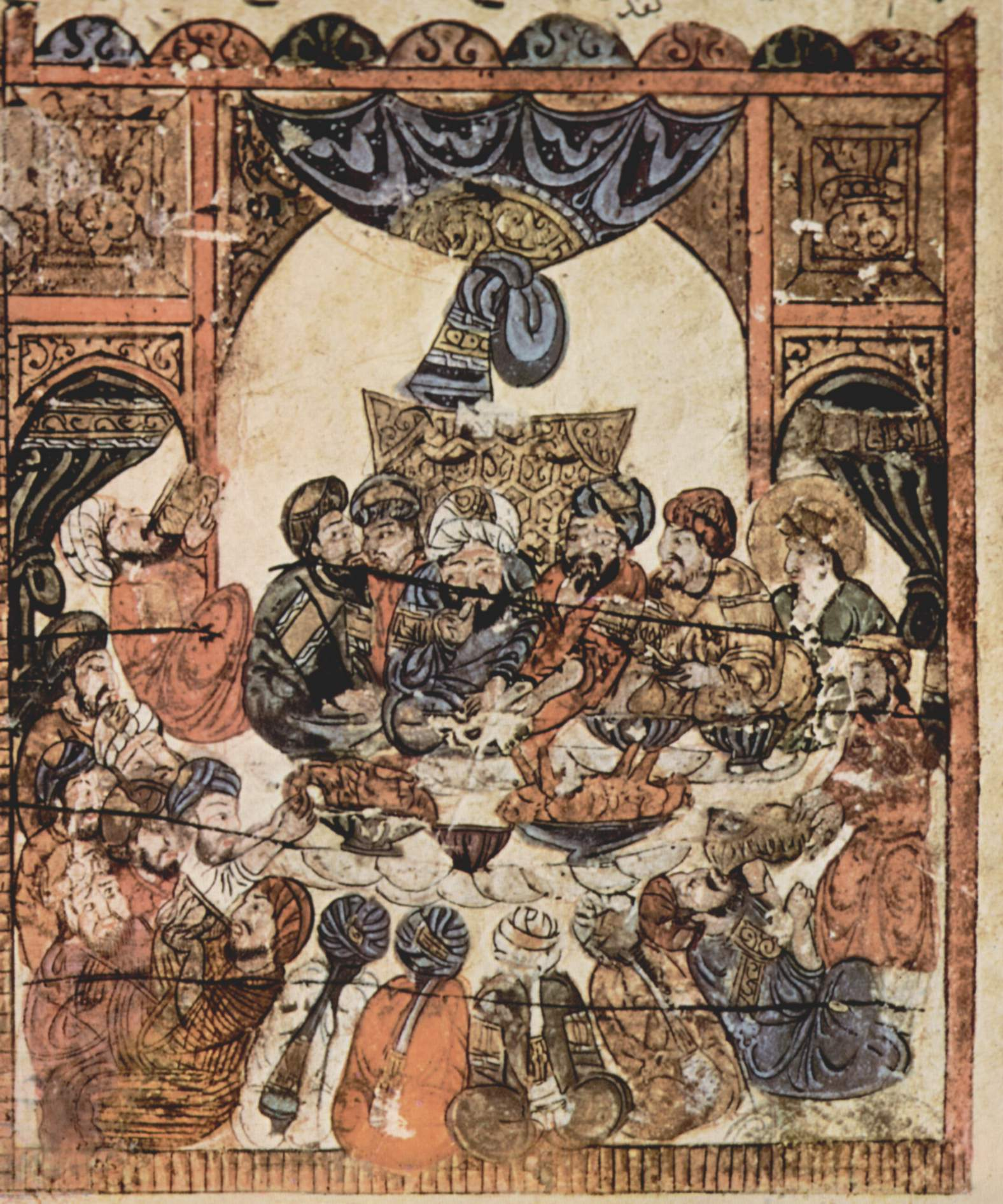
Assembly

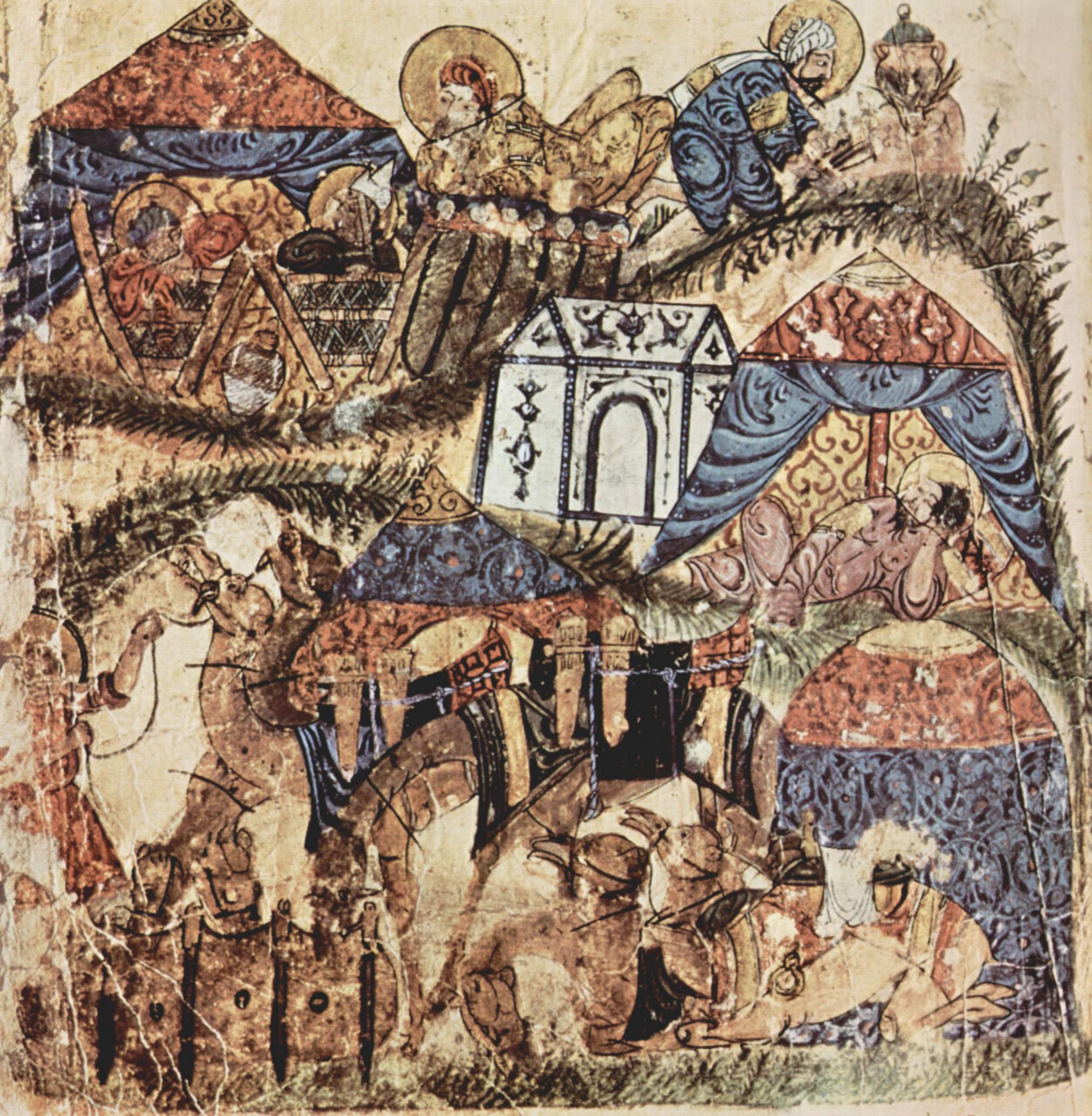
Travelers

==== London, British Library, Ms. Or. Add. 22114 (early 14th century) ====
This manuscript may have been made in Syria, in the early 14th century. The first and last pages are lost. Many miniatures are well preserved, but they are dull and repetitive, suggesting a copy without much invention. A governorial figure wearing typically Seljuq or Turkic costume, particularly the sharbush headgear, and quite similar to the figure of Badr ad-Din Lu'lu' in other manuscripts, appears on several of the folios (such as maqama 21).

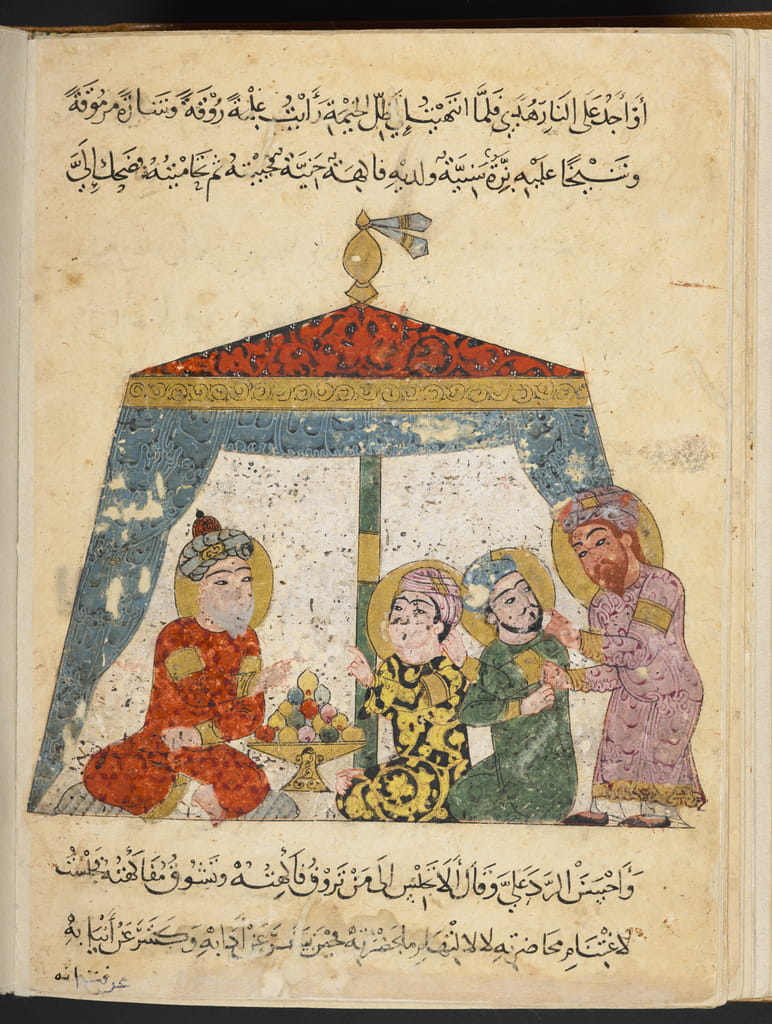
MS Or. Add. 22114, folio 96r

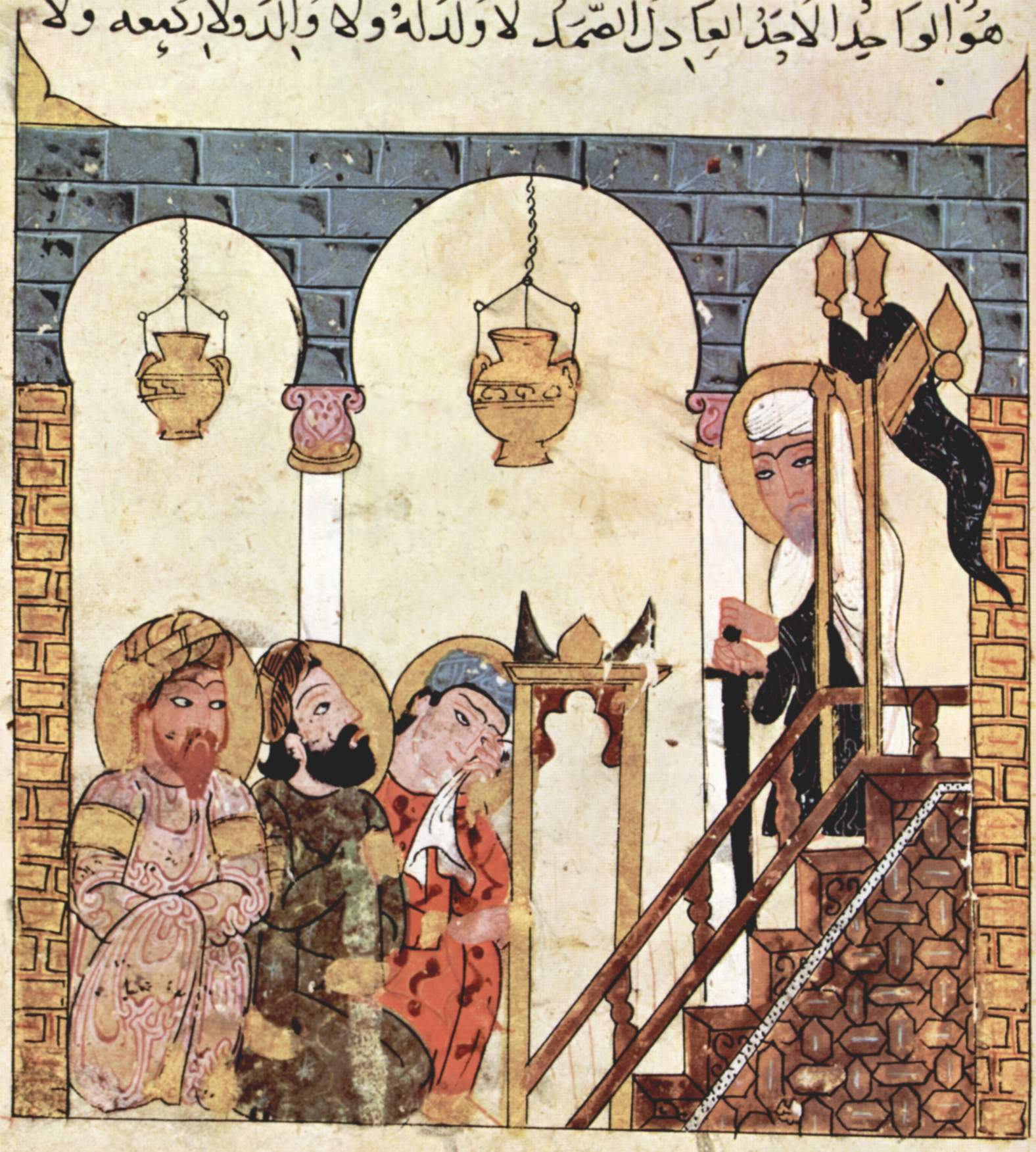
MS Or. Add. 22114, folio 94

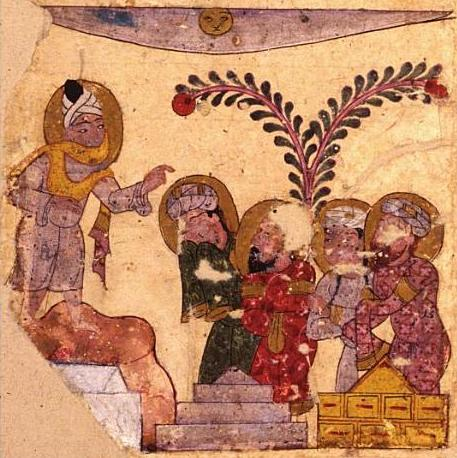
British Library, Ms. Or. Add. 22114

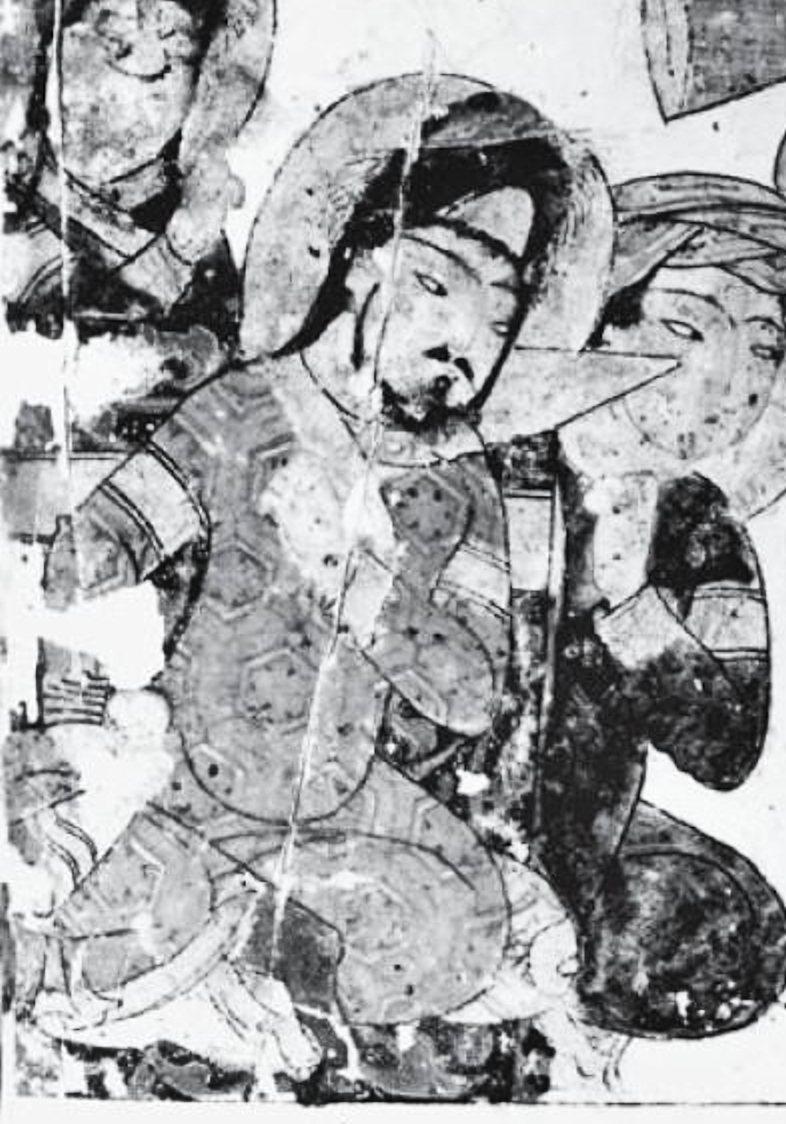
Maqama 21: Turkic governor at Rayy, with sharbush. British Library, Ms. Or. Add. 22114.

==== London, British Library, Ms. Or. 7293 (1323) ====
This manuscript has a colophon describing the date of its manufacture as 1323. It is beautifully made, and suggests a luxury copy. Still, many of the miniatures are left blank and were never completed. It may have been copied from Paris, Bibliothèque Nationale de France, Arabe 5847. The manuscript was acquired by a tax collector in Damascus in 1375–1376, according to an inscription on the first page.

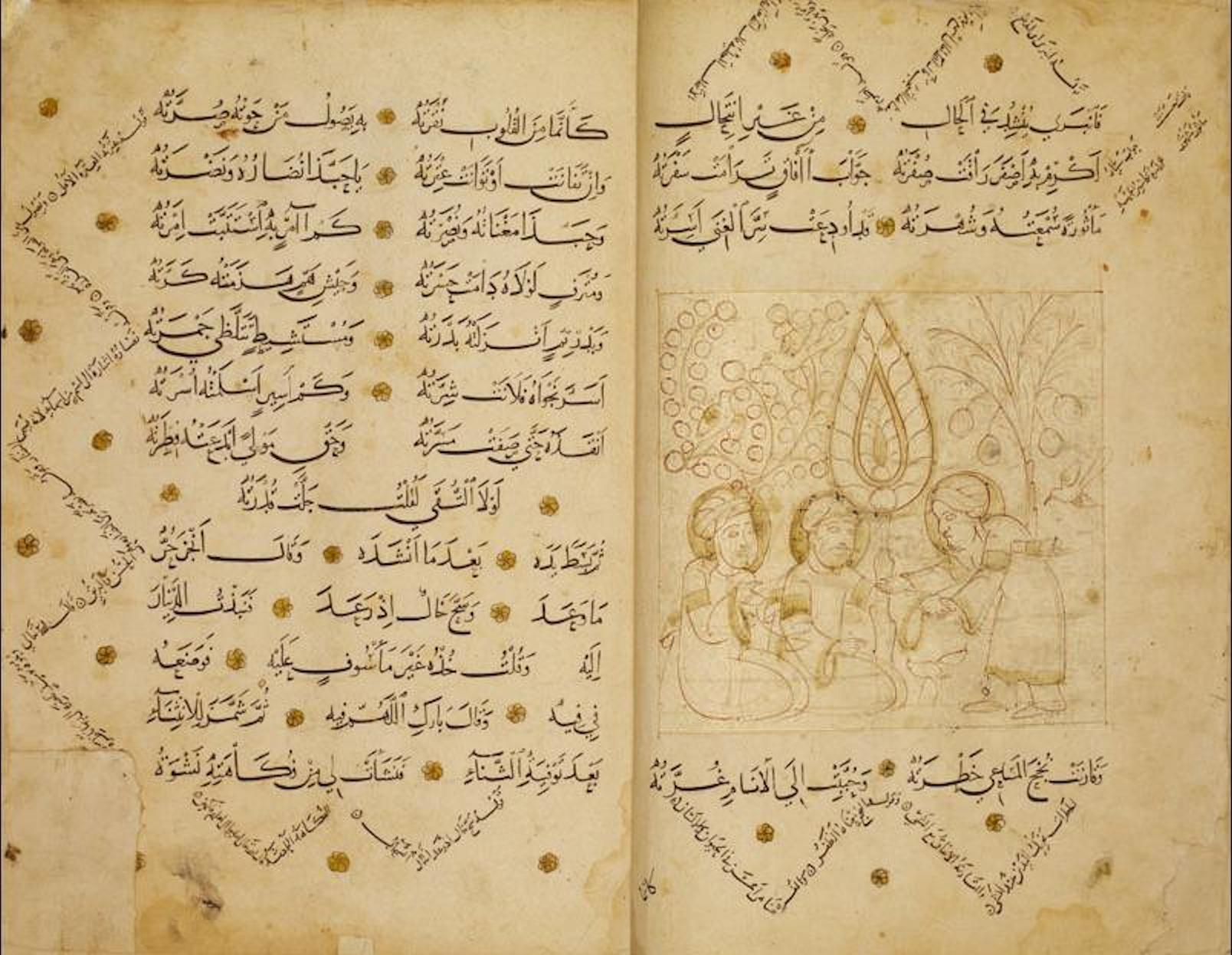
Maqāmāt, British Library, Ms. Or. Add. 7293

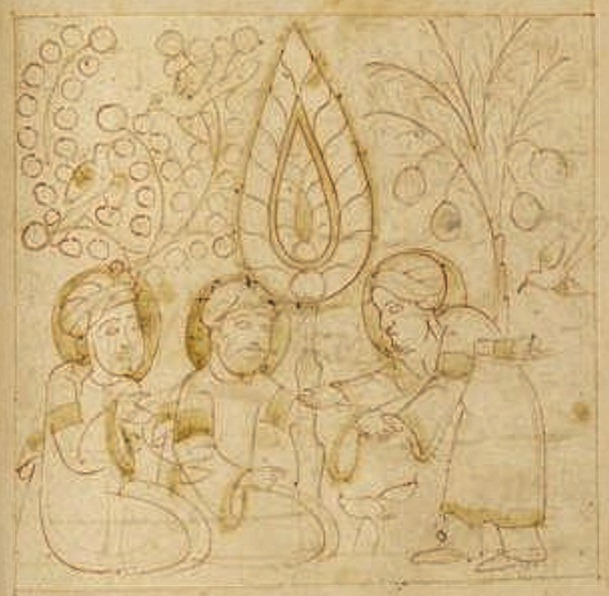
Maqamat, British Library, Ms. Or. Add. 7293 (detail). Abū Zayd and his audience (maqāma 3)

==== Vienna, National Library of Austria, AF9 (1334) ====
This copy is dated to the Egyptian Mamluk era, and was produced in Egypt or Syria, most probably in Cairo. The fronstispiece shows an enthroned Prince at his court. The style is Turkic: "In the paintings the facial cast of these [ruling] Turks is obviously reflected, and so are the special fashions and accoutrements they favored". The ruler may be the Mamluk Sultan An-Nasir Muhammad.

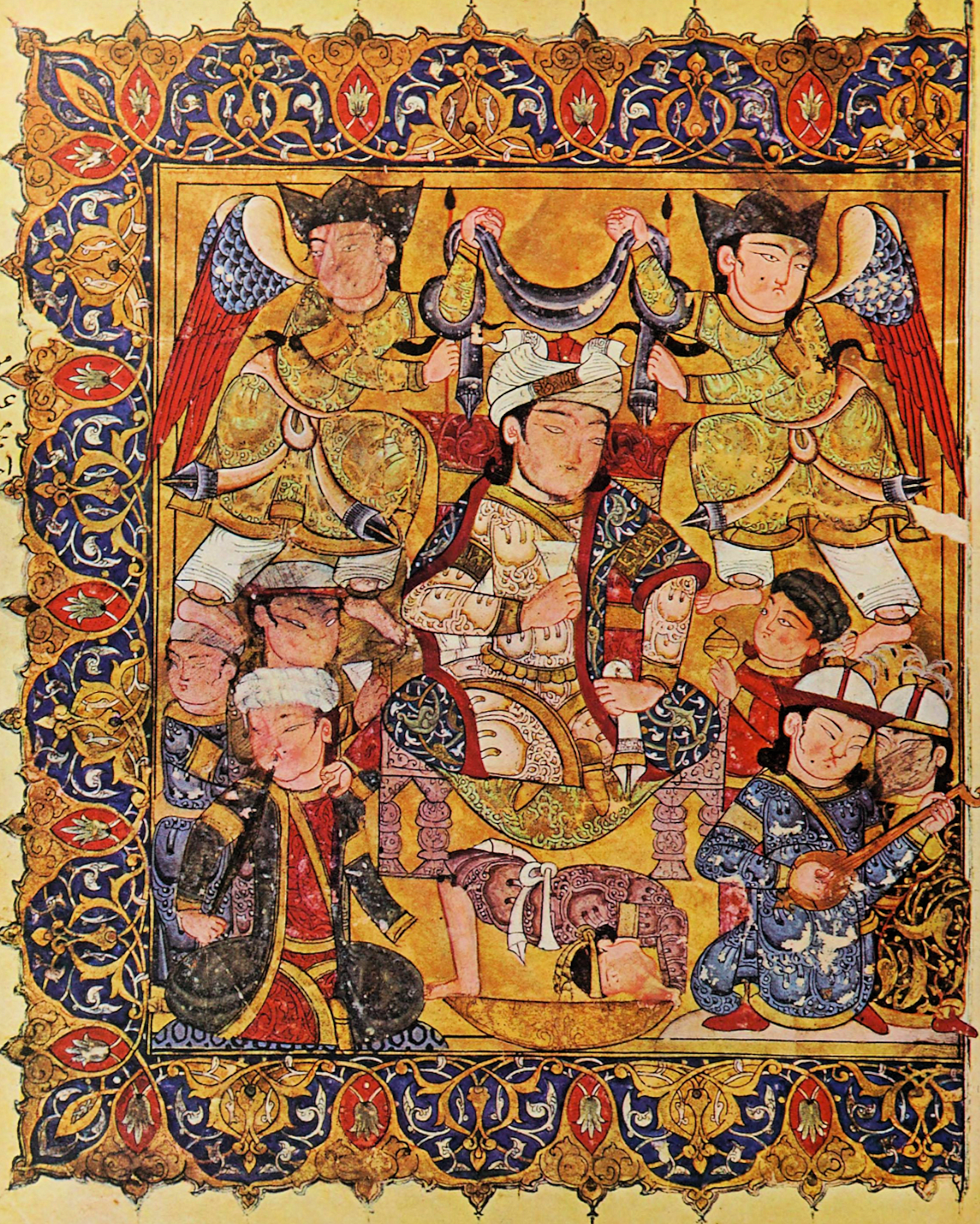
Frontispiece with Mamluk court scene. Probably Egypt, dated 1334. Maqamat of Al-Hariri.

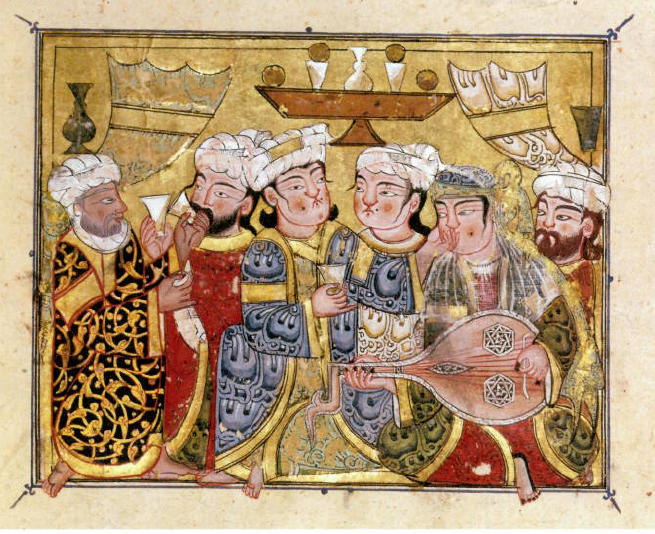
Maqamat of al-Hariri, Vienna manuscript AF 9, 1334 CE Folio 42v

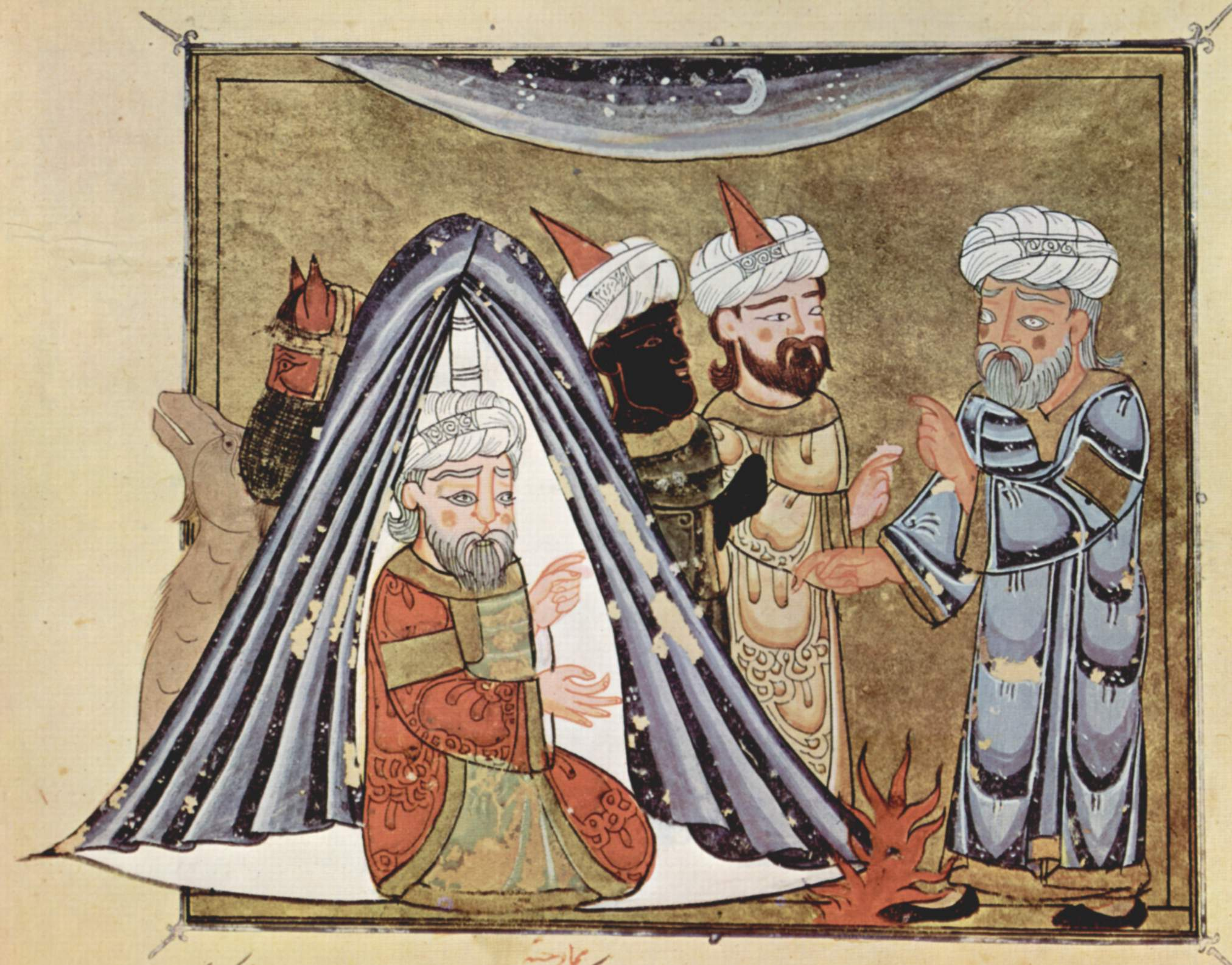
Maqamat of Al-Hariri, 1334

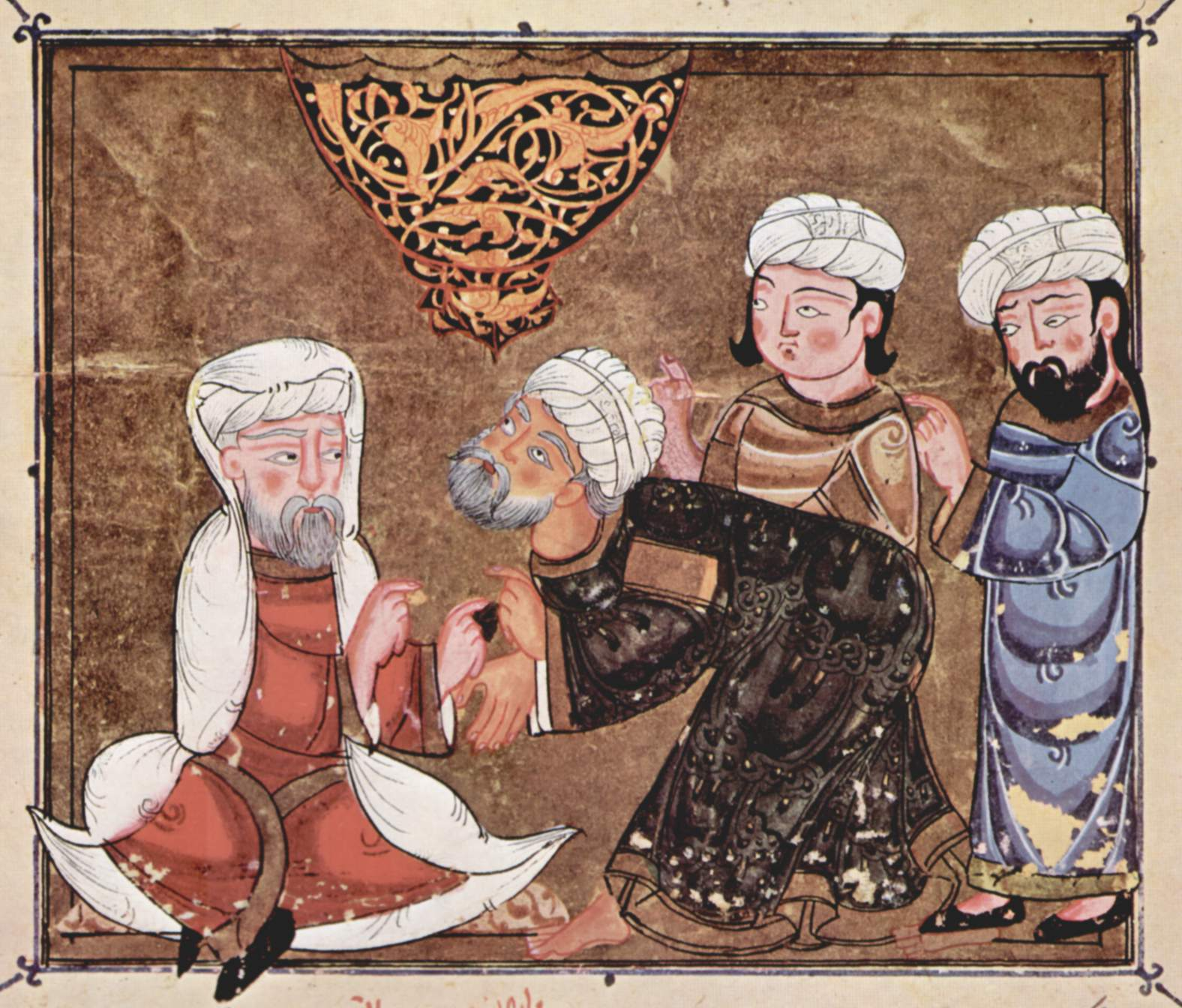
Abū Zayd pleads before the qāḍī of Ma'arra, Maqamat al-Hariri, (1334), Austrian National Library

==== Oxford, Bodleian Library, MS Marsh 458 (1337) ====
Only a few pages of this manuscript remain. The colophon indicates that it was manufactured in 1337 for an official at the Mamluk court, the Mamluk amir Nasir al-Din Muhammad, son of Husam al-Din Tarantay Silahdar, in Cairo, Egypt.

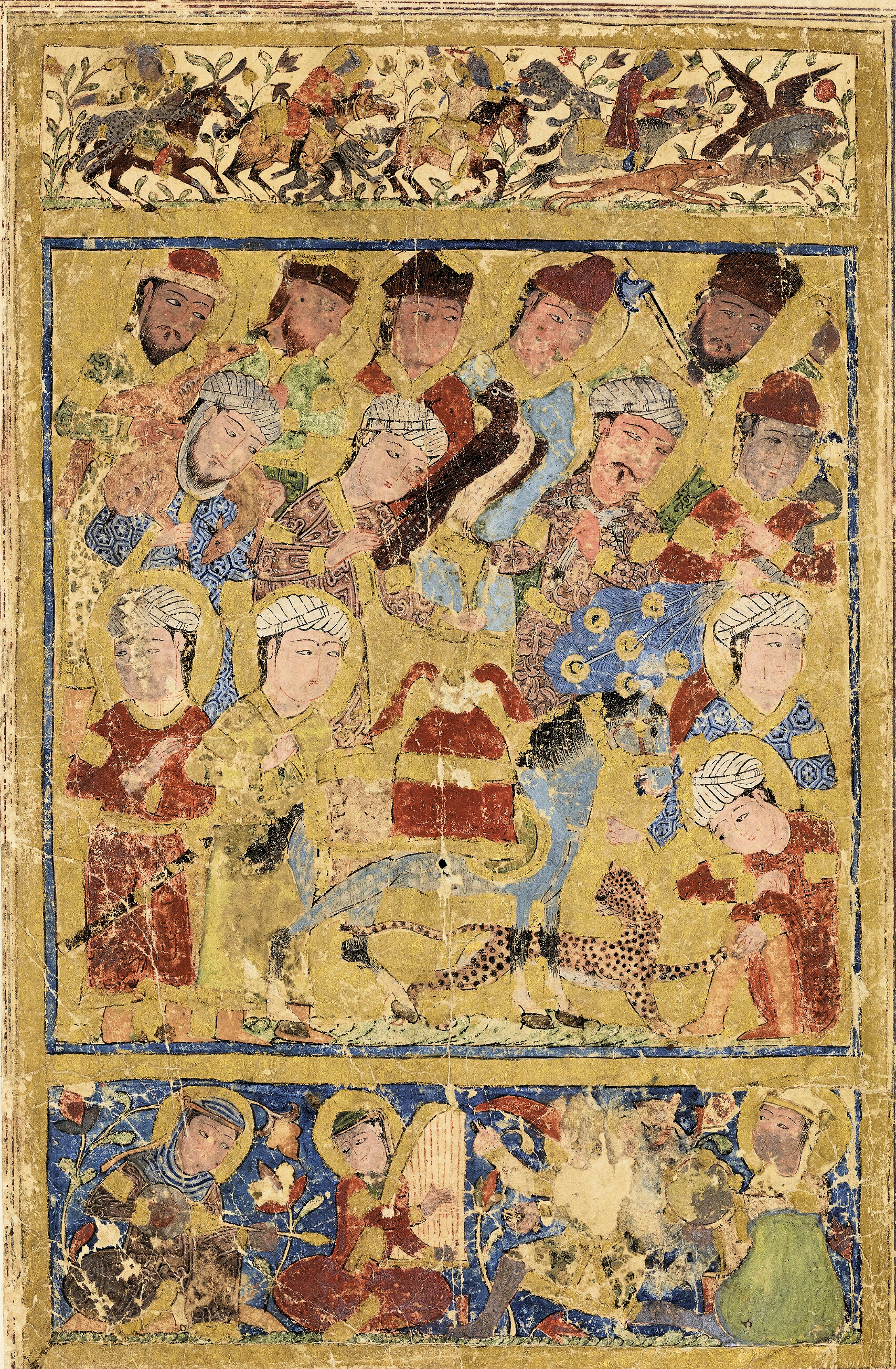
Ms. Marsh 458, Frontispiece

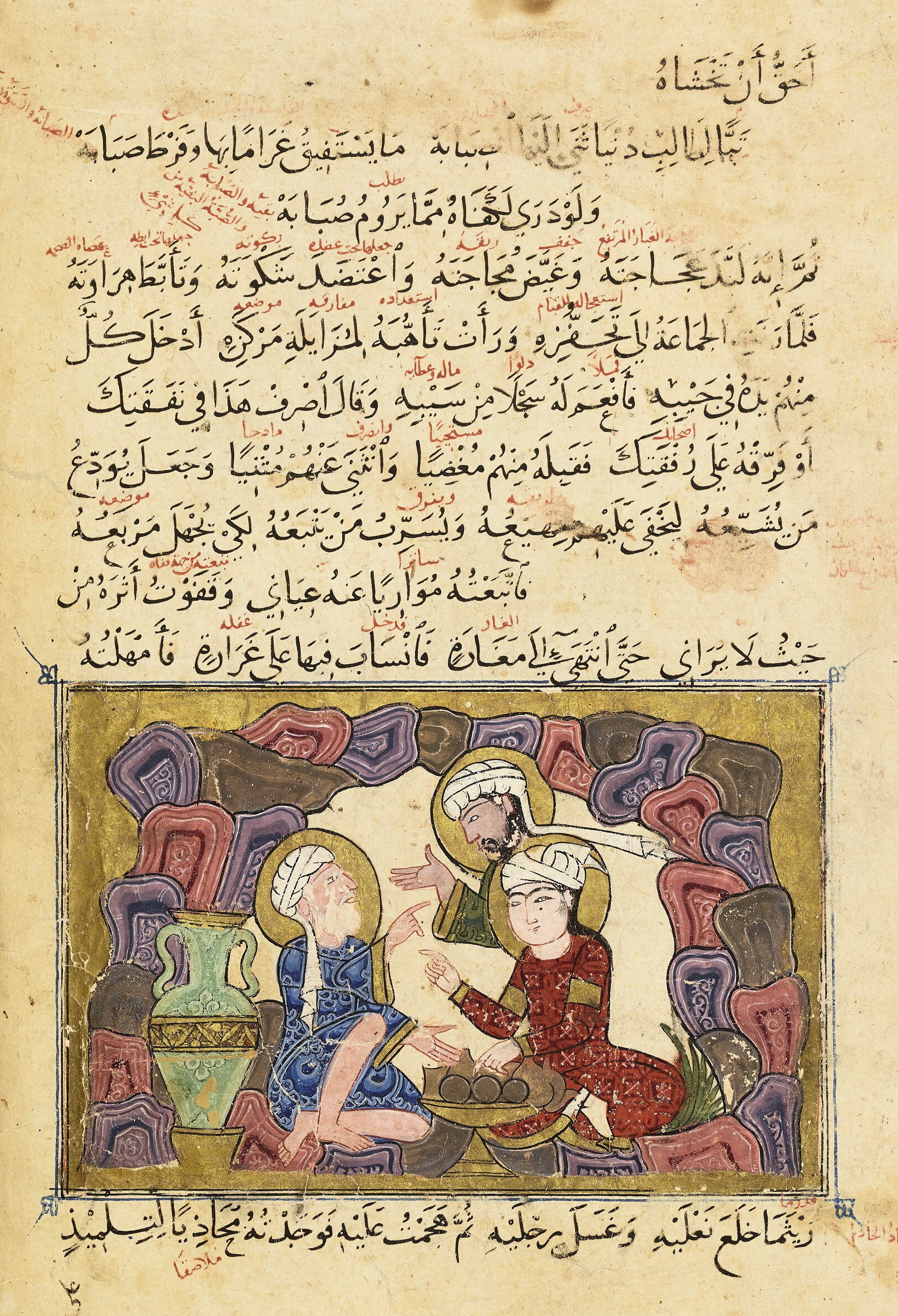
Ms. Marsh 458, Folio 7b

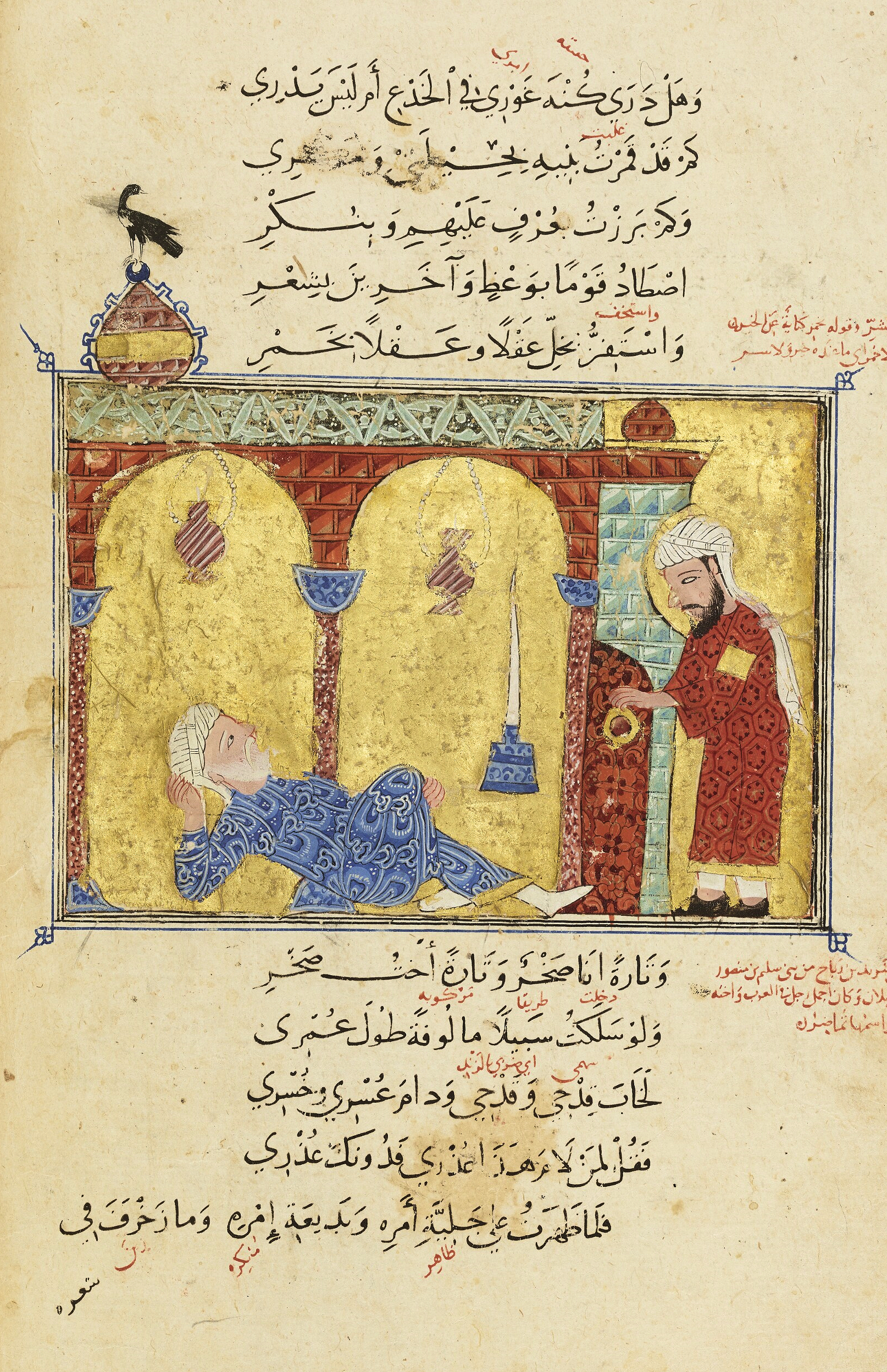
Ms. Marsh 458, Folio 29b

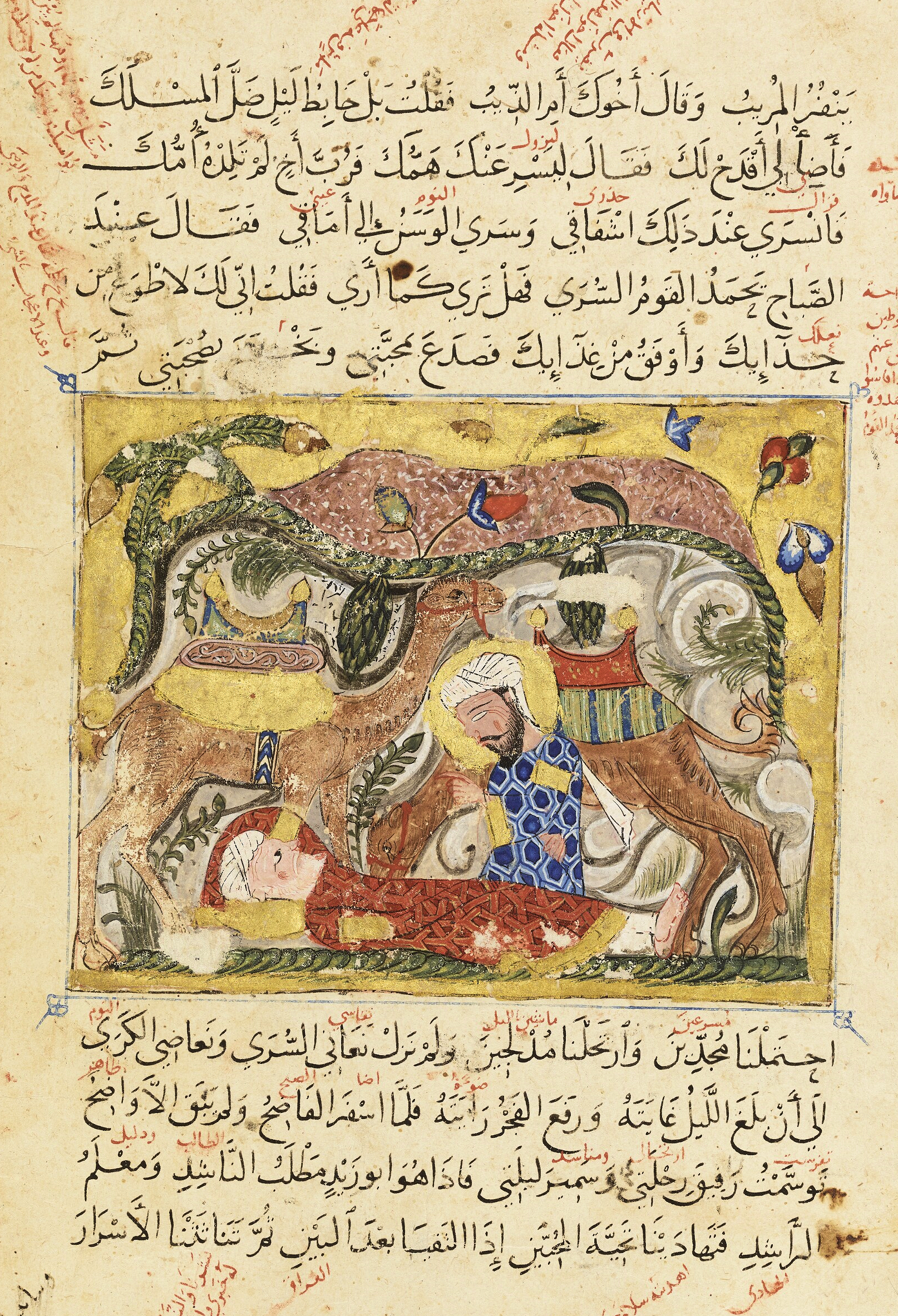
Ms. Marsh 458, Folio 77b

== Figures of local potentates ==
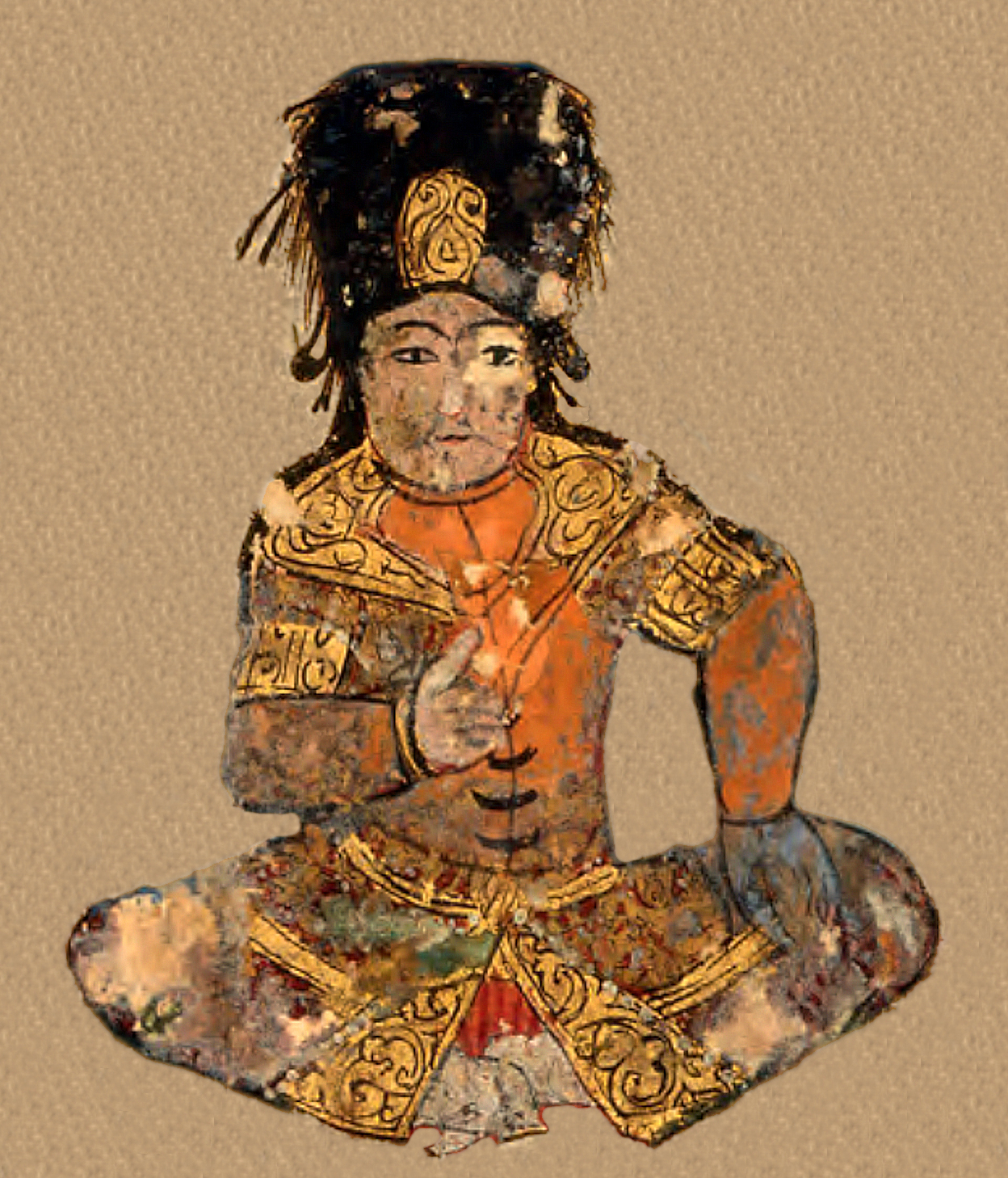
Dignitary in Turkic military dress: long braids, sharbush fur hat, boots, close-fitting coat. He may be an amir. From Maqamat, 1237 CE edition (BNF Arabe 5847).

Figures of Qadis, Sheikhs, Princes or Governors appear recurrently in the various manuscripts of Maqamat al-Hariri, from the 13th century miniatures of North Jazira down to those of the Mamluk period. These are characteristic of the figures of princely cycle and courtly life in early Islamic art. These figures are generally similar to Seljuq depictions of authority, wearing typically Seljuq or Turkic costumes, particularly the sharbush headgear, with distinctive facial features, and sitting cross-legged on a throne with one hand on the knee and one arm raised. These figures are also similar to those in the frontispieces of the Kitab al-Aghani and Kitab al-Diryaq of the mid-13th century. In all manuscripts, these figures of power and authority in Seljuk style are very different from the otherwise omnipresent figures in Arabic style with their long robes and turbans. Snelders summarizes the situation in socio-political terms:

...thirteenth-century manuscripts of the Maqamat of al-Hariri, in which a similar iconographic differentiation can be found. In a number of these manuscripts a careful distinction is made between royal and non-royal figures, both in terms of physical appearance and dress. Whereas princes and governors are commonly represented with the same ‘Asiatic’ or ‘Oriental’ facial features, and dressed in Turkish military garments like fur-trimmed caps (sharbush) and short close-fitting tunics, most other figures are depicted with ‘Arab’ or ‘Semitic’ facial features, and dressed in long robes and turbans. Apparently in keeping with the contemporary political and social makeup of the region in which these manuscripts were produced, a visual distinction was made along ethnic and social lines, between the non-Arab Turkish ruling elite and the indigenous Arab bourgeoisie.

— Snelders Identity and Christian-Muslim interaction : medieval art of the Syrian Orthodox from the Mosul area.

== In popular culture ==
In 1972, the Jordan Radio and Television Corporation produced a historical drama series titled Maqāmāt al‑Harīrī series (مسلسل مقامات الحريري), based on the classic tales of al‑Hariri. Directed by Safwat Ghattas and scripted by Gulbahar Moumtaz, the production featured prominent actors such as Rashid Allama, Habib Shams, Marwan Haddad, Abd al‑Majid Majzoub, and Zakaria al‑Masri.

== See also ==
- Maqamat Badi' az-Zaman al-Hamadhani

== Sources ==
- Contadini, Anna (1 January 2012). A World of Beasts: A Thirteenth-Century Illustrated Arabic Book on Animals (the Kitāb Na't al-Ḥayawān) in the Ibn Bakhtīshū' Tradition. Brill. doi:10.1163/9789004222656_005.
- Ettinghausen, Richard (1977). La Peinture arabe (in French). Geneva: Skira. pp. 104–124.
  - Translated as Ettinghausen, Richard (1977b). Arab painting. New York : Rizzoli. ISBN 978-0-8478-0081-0.
- Grabar, Oleg (1984). The Illustrations of the Maqamat (PDF). University of Chicago Press. p. 7.
- Grabar, Oleg. "Maqamat Al-Hariri: Illustrated Arabic Manuscript from the 13th century".
- Hillenbrand, Robert (1 January 2010). "The Schefer Ḥarīrī: A Study in Islamic Frontispiece Design". Arab Painting. pp. 117–134. doi:10.1163/9789004236615_011. ISBN 978-90-04-23661-5.
- Shah, Amina (1980). The assemblies of al-Hariri : fifty encounters with the Shaykh Abu Zayd of Seruj. London : Octagon Press. ISBN 978-0-900860-86-7.
- Snelders, B. (2010). Identity and Christian-Muslim interaction : medieval art of the Syrian Orthodox from the Mosul area. Peeters, Leuven.
- Al Maqamat: Beautifully Illustrated Arabic Literary Tradition – 1001 Inventions
