= Furusiyya =

Historical Arabic term for equestrian martial exercise

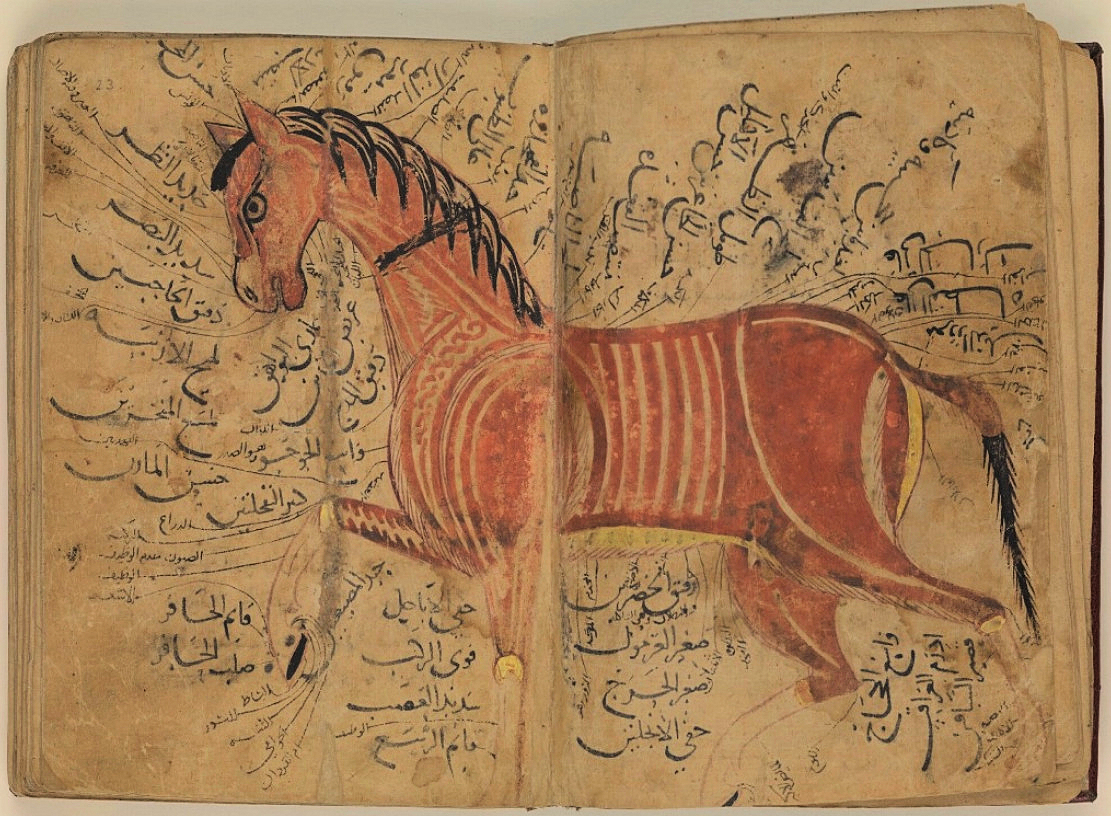
Illustration of a horse's ideal physical traits, 13th century manuscript of the Kitāb al-bayṭara by Aḥmad ibn ʿAtīq al-Azdī.

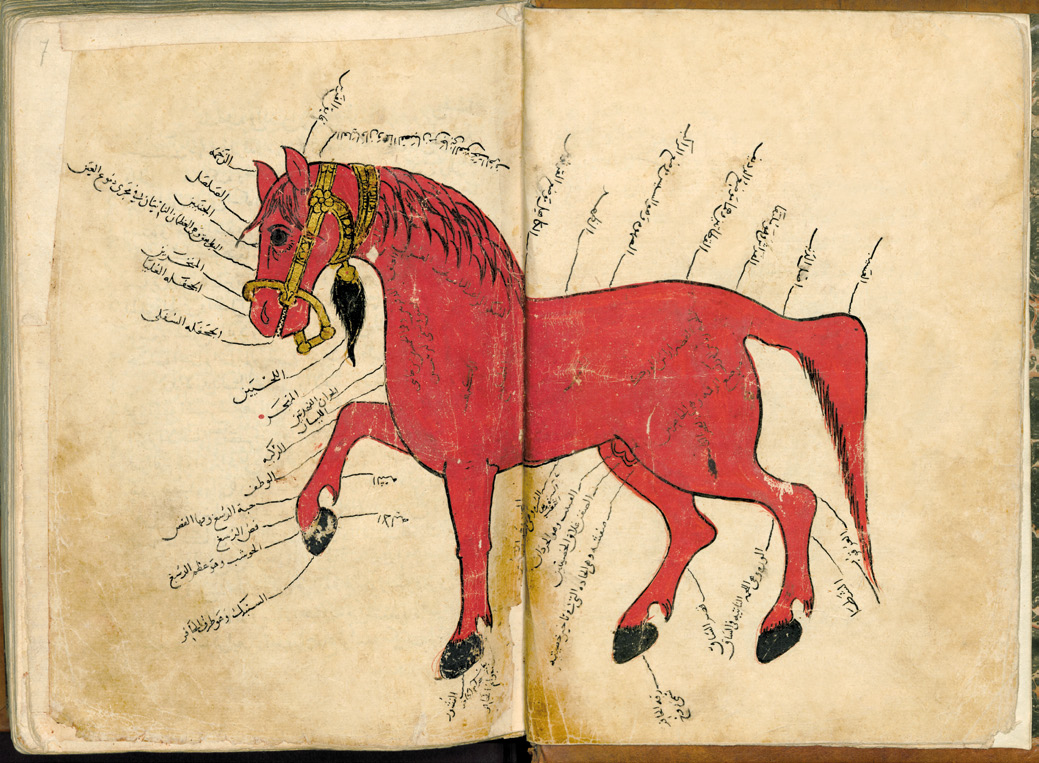
Muhammad ibn Yaqub al-Khuttuli: Kitab al-furusiyya wa’l-baitara (Horsemanship and Veterinary Book). Leiden University Library manuscript Or. 299 (1), 1343.

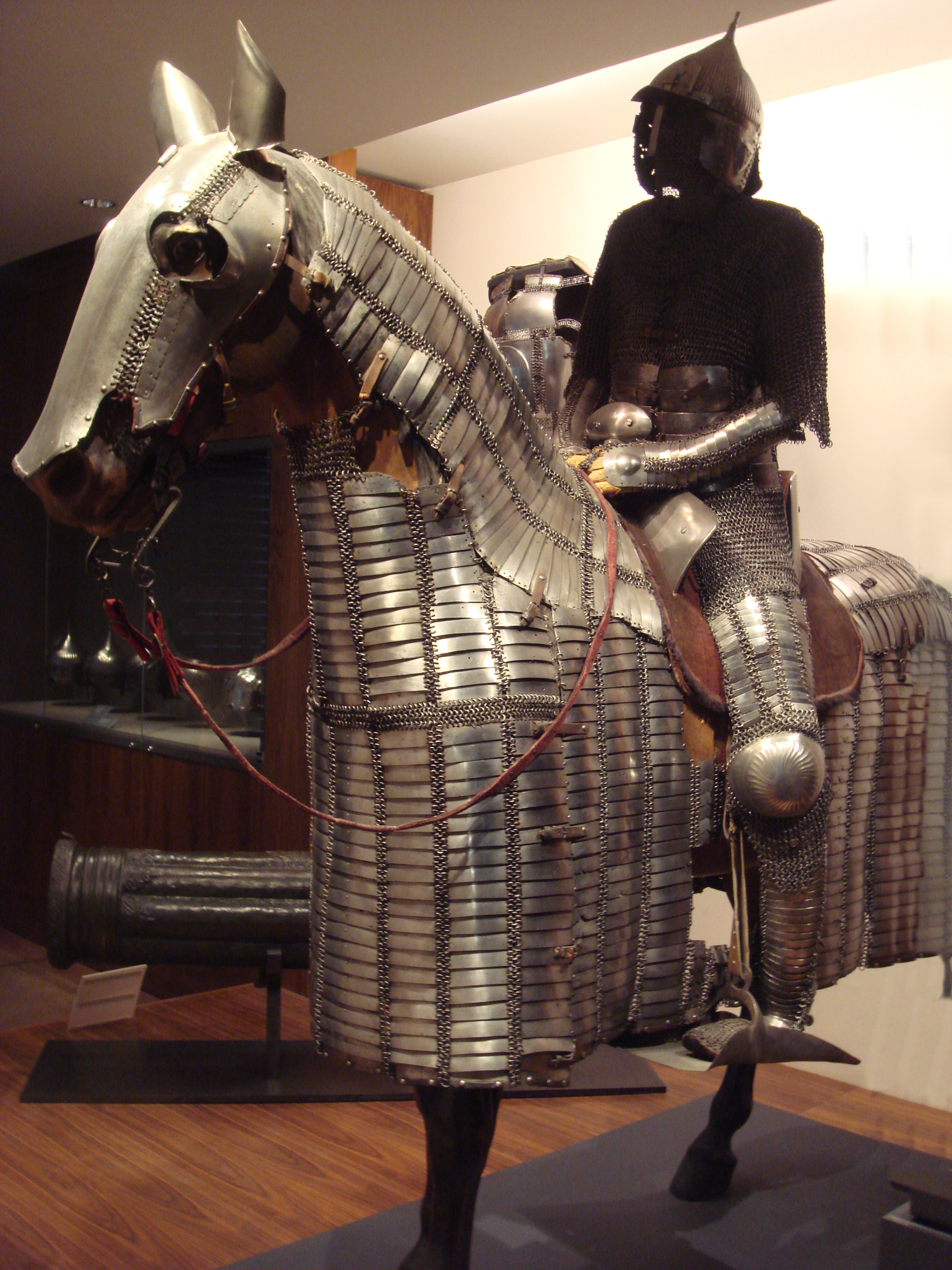
Late Mamluk / early Ottoman Egyptian horse armour (Egypt, c. 1550; Musée de l'Armée.

Furūsiyya (Arabic: فروسية; also transliterated as furūsīyah, knighthood) is an Arabic knightly discipline and ethical code developed in the Middle Ages. It was practised in the medieval Muslim world from Afghanistan to Muslim Spain, and particularly during the Crusades and the Mamluk period. The combat form uses martial arts and equestrianism as its foundation.

The term furūsiyya is a derivation of faras (فرس) "horse", and in Modern Standard Arabic means "equestrianism" in general. The term for "horseman" or "cavalier" ("knight") is fāris (فارس), which is also the origin of the Spanish rank of alférez. The Perso-Arabic term for "Furūsiyya literature" is faras-nāma or asb-nāma. Faras-nāma is also described as a small encyclopedia about horses.

The three basic categories of furūsiyya are horsemanship, including veterinary aspects of proper care for the horse (hippology) and the proper riding techniques (equestrianism), mounted archery, and jousting. Ibn Qayyim al-Jawziyya adds swordsmanship as a fourth discipline in his treatise Al-Furūsiyya (1350). Ibn Akhi Hizam also cited that there are three fundamentals to the furūsiyya: horse mastery, proficiency in handling all types of weapons, and bravery.

== History ==
=== Tradition ===
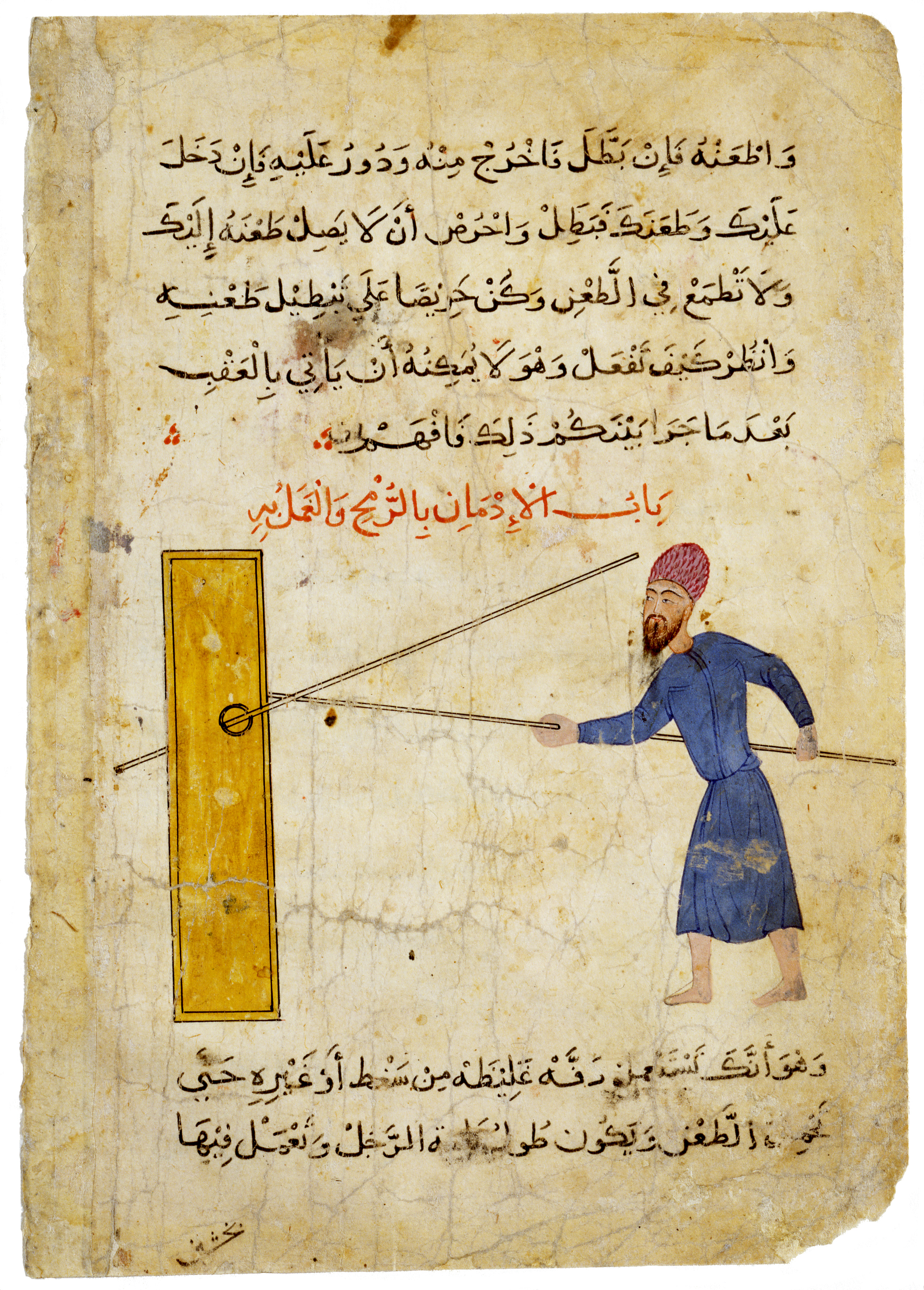
Late Mamluk-era manuscript on training with the lance (The David Collection Inv. nr. 19/2001, c. 1500).

The Arabic literary tradition involving equestrianism dates back thousands of years and occupied large sections of pre-Islamic Arabic poetry. That of veterinary medicine (hippiatry) in Furusiyya literature, much like in the case of human medicine, was adopted from Byzantine Greek sources in the 9th to 10th centuries. In the case of furūsiyya, the immediate source is the Byzantine compilation on veterinary medicine known as the Hippiatrica (5th or 6th century); the very word for "horse doctor" in Arabic, bayṭar, is a Greek: ἱππιατρός, romanized: hippiatros.

=== Arabic treatises ===
The first known such treatise in Arabic is due to Ibn Akhī Ḥizām (ابن أخي حزام), an Abbasid-era commander and stable master to caliph Al-Muʿtadid (r. 892–902), author of Kitāb al-Furūsiyya wa 'l-Bayṭara ("Book of Horsemanship and Hippiatry"). Ibn al-Nadim in the late 10th century records the availability in Baghdad of several treatises on horses and veterinary medicine attributed to Greek authors.

The discipline peaked in Mamluk Sultanate during the 14th century. In a narrow sense, furūsiyya literature comprises works by professional military writers with a Mamluk background or close ties to the Mamluk establishment. These treatises often quote pre-Mamluk works on military strategy. Some of the works were versified for didactic purposes. The best known versified treatise is the one by Taybugha al-Ashrafi al-Baklamishi al-Yunan ("the Greek"), who in c. 1368 wrote the poem al-tullab fi ma'rifat ramy al-nushshab. The discipline of furusiyya became increasingly detached from its origins in Byzantine veterinary medicine and more focussed on military arts.

=== Categories ===
The three basic categories of furūsiyya are horsemanship, including hippology and veterinary aspects of proper care for the horse, and the appropriate riding techniques, mounted archery, and jousting. Ibn Qayyim al-Jawziyya adds swordsmanship as a fourth discipline in his treatise Al-Furūsiyya (1350). Ibn Akhi Hizam also cited that there are three fundamentals to furūsiyya: horse mastery, proficiency in handling all types of weapons, and bravery.

=== Persian treatises ===
Persian faras-nāma which can be dated with confidence are extant only from about the mid-14th century, but the tradition survives longer in Persia, throughout the Safavid era. One treatise by ʿAbd-Allāh Ṣafī, known as the Bahmanī faras-nāma (written in 1407/8) is said to preserve a chapter from an otherwise lost 12th-century (Ghaznavid-era) text. There is a candidate for another treatise of this age, extant in a single manuscript: the treatise attributed to one Moḥammad b. Moḥammad b. Zangī, also known as Qayyem Nehāvandī, has been tentatively dated as originating in the 12th century. Some of the Persian treatises are translations from the Arabic. One short work, attributed to Aristotle, is a Persian translation from the Arabic. There are supposedly also treatises translated into Persian from Hindustani or Sanskrit. These include the Faras-nāma-ye hāšemī by Zayn-al-ʿĀbedīn Ḥosaynī Hašemī (written 1520), and the Toḥfat al-ṣadr by Ṣadr-al-Dīn Moḥammad Khan b. Zebardast Khan (written 1722/3). Texts thought to have been originally written in Persian include the Asb-nāma by Moḥammad b. Moḥammad Wāseʿī (written 1365/6; Tehran, Ketāb-ḵāna-ye Malek MS no. 5754). A partial listing of known Persian faras-nāma literature was published by Gordfarāmarzī (1987).

== List of Furusiyyah treatises ==
The following is a list of known Furusiyyah treatises (after al-Sarraf 2004, al-Nashīrī 2007).

Some of the early treatises (9th to 10th centuries) are not extant and are only known from references by later authors: Al-Asma'i, Kitāb al-khayl (خيل "horse"), Ibn Abi al-Dunya (d. 894 / AH 281) Al-sabq wa al-ramī, Al-Ṭabarānī (d. 971 / AH 360) Faḍl al-ramī, Al-Qarrāb (d. 1038 / AH 429), Faḍā'il al-ramī.

Author	Date	Title	Manuscripts / Editions
Ibn Akhī Hizām (Muḥammad ibn Yaʿqūb ibn Ghālib ibn ʿAlī al-Khuttalī)	fl. c. 900	"Kitāb al-Furūsiyya wa-al-Bayṭarah" (or "Kitāb al-Furūsiyya wa-Shiyāt al-Khayl")	Istanbul, Bayezit State Library, Veliyüddin Efendi MS 3174; British Library MS Add. 23416 (14th century); Istanbul, Fatih Mosque Library MS 3513 (added title "Al-Kamāl fī al-Furūsiyya..."); Leiden, Muhammad ibn Yaqub al-Khuttuli: Kitab al-furusiyya wa’l-baitara (Horsemanship and Veterinary Book). Leiden University Library manuscript Or. 299 (1), 1343.
Al-Tarsusi (Marḍī ibn ʿAlī al-Ṭarsūsī)	died 1193 / AH 589	"Tabṣirat arbāb al-albāb fī kayfīyat al-najāt fī al-ḥurūb min al-anwā' wa-nashr aʿlām al-aʿlām fī al-ʿudad wa-al-ālāt al-muʿīnah ʿalá liqā' al-aʿdā'"	Oxford, Bodleian Library MS Huntington 264
Aḥmad ibn al-Ḥusayn ibn al-Aḥnaf	12th century	"Kitāb al-bayṭara"	Egyptian National Library and Archives, Khalil Agha F8 (dated 1209); Istanbul, Topkapı Library, TSMK, A. 2115 (dated 1210)
Abū Aḥmad (Abū Muḥammad Aḥmad ibn ‘Atīq al-Azdī)	1223 / AH 620	"Kitāb al-furūsiyya wa-l-bayṭarah" (an abbreviated version of Ibn Akhī Ḥizām's treatise)	British Library Or 1523
Al-Zahirī (Badr al-Dīn Baktūt al-Rammāḥ al-Khāzindārī al-Zahirī)	13th century	"Kitāb fī ʿIlm al-Furūsiyya wa-Laʿb al-Rumḥ wa-al-Birjās wa-ʿIlāj al-Khayl" (or "ʿIlm al-Furūsiyya wa-Siyāsat al-Khayl", "Al-Furūsiyya bi-rasm al-Jihād wa-mā aʿadda Allāh li 'l-Mujāhidīn min al-ʿIbād")	Bibliothèque Nationale MS 2830 (fols. 2v.–72r.); ed. al-Mihrajān al-Waṭanī lil-Turāth wa-al-Thaqāfah, Riyadh (1986); ed. Muḥammad ibn Lājīn Rammāḥ, Silsilat Kutub al-turāth 6, Damascus, Dār Kinān (1995).
Al-Aḥdab (Najm al-Dīn Ḥasan al-Rammāḥ)	died 1295 / AH 695	"Al-Furūsiyya wa-al-manāṣib al-ḥarbiyya" (The book of military horsemanship and ingenious war devices)	ed. ʿĪd Ḍayf ʿAbbādī, Silsilat Kutub al-turāth, Baghdad (1984).
Al-Ḥamwī (Muḥammad ibn Ibrāhīm Ibn Jamāʿah al-Ḥamwī)	died 1332 / AH 733	"Mustanad al-ajnād fī ālāt al-jihād"	
Ibn al-Mundhir (Abū Bakr al-Bayṭar ibn Badr al-Dīn al-Nāsirī)	died 1340/1	"Kāshif al-Wayl fī Maʿrifat Amrāḍ al-Khayl" (or "Kāmil al-ṣināʿatayn fī al-Bayṭarah wa-al-Zardaqah")	Bibliothèque Nationale MS 2813
Al-Aqsarā'ī (Muḥammad ibn ʿIsá ibn Ismāʿīl al-Hanafī al-Aqsarā'ī)	died 1348	"Nihāyat al-Sūl wa-al-Umniyya fī Taʿlīm Aʿmāl al-Furūsiyya"	British Library MS Add. 18866 (dated 1371 / AH 773); Chester Beatty Library MS Ar 5655 (dated 1366 / AH 788).
Al-Nāṣirī (Muḥammad Ibn Manglī al-Nāṣirī)	died after 1376	"Al-Adillah al-Rasmiyya fī al-Taʿābī al-Harbiyya"	Istanbul, Ayasofya Library MS 2857
Al-Nāṣirī (Muḥammad Ibn Manglī al-Nāṣirī)	died after 1376	"Al-Tadbīrāt al-Sulṭāniyya fī Siyāsat al-Sināʿah al-Harbiyya"	British Library MS Or. 3734
Al-Nāṣirī (Muḥammad Ibn Manglī al-Nāṣirī)	died after 1376	"Uns al-Malā bi-Waḥsh al-Falā"	Bibliothèque Nationale MS 2832/1
Aṭājuq (Alṭanbughā al-Husāmī al-Nāṣirī)	1419 / AH 822	"Nuzhat al-Nufūs fī Laʿb al-Dabbūs"	Dār al-Kutub al-Miṣriyya MS 21 furūsiyya Taymūr
Sulaymānah (Yūsuf ibn Aḥmad)	written before 1427 / AH 830	"Faraj al-Makrūb fī aḥkām al-ḥurūb wa muʻānātihā wa-mudaratiha wa-lawazimiha wa-ma yasu'u bi-amrihā"	
Muhammad ibn Yaʿqūb ibn aḫī Ḫozām	1470 / 1471	"Kitāb al-makhzūn jāmiʻ al-funūn"	Bibliothèque Nationale MS Ar 2824
		"Al-ʿAdīm al-Mithl al-Rafīʿ al-Qadr"	Istanbul, Topkapı Sarayı Library MS Revan 1933
pseudo-Al-Aḥdab; Aḥmad ibn Muḥammad Abū al-Maʿālī al-Kūfī	17th century	"Kitāb al-Furūsiyya" (added title)	Bibliothèque Nationale MS 2829
Al-Asadī (Abū al-Rūḥ ʿIsá ibn Hassān al-Asadī al-Baghdādī)		"Al-Jamharah fī ʿUlūm al-Bayzarah"	British Library MS Add. 23417; Madrid, Escorial Library MS Ar. 903
ʿUmar ibn Raslān al-Bulqīnī		"Qaṭr al-Sayl fī Amr al-Khayl"	Istanbul, Süleymaniye Library MS Şehid Alī Pasha 1549
Sharaf al-Dīn ʿAbd al-Mu'min ibn Khalaf al-Dimyāṭī		"Faḍl al-Khayl"	Bibliothèque Nationale MS 2816
Abū Muḥammad Jamāl al-Dīn ʿAbd Allāh Ibn Maymūn		"Kitāb al-Ifādah wa-al-Tabṣīr li-Kull Rāmin Mubtadi' aw Māhir Naḥrīr bi-al-Sahm al-Tawīl wa-al-Qaṣīr"	Istanbul, Köprülü Mehmet Pasha Library MS 1213
ʿAlā'al-Dīn ʿAlī ibn Abī al-Qāsim al-Naqīb al-Akhmīmī		"Hall al-Ishkāl fī al-Ramy bi-al-Nibāl"	Bibliothèque Nationale MS 6259
ʿAlā'al-Dīn ʿAlī ibn Abī al-Qāsim al-Naqīb al-Akhmīmī		"Naqāwat al-Muntaqá fī Nāfiʿāt al-Liqā"	British Library MS Add. 7513/2
Rukn al-Dīn Jamshīd al-Khwārazmī		untitled	British Library MS Or. 3631/3
		"Kitāb fī Laʿb al-Dabbūs wa-al-Sirāʿ ʿalá al-Khayl"	Bibliothèque Nationale MS Ar. 6604/2
		"Kitāb al-Hiyal fī al-Hurūb wa-Fatḥ al-Madā'in wa-Hifz al-Durūb"	British Library MS Add. 14055
		"Kitāb al-Makhzūn Jāmiʿ al-Funūn" / "Kitāb al-Makhzūn li-Arbāb al-Funūn"	Bibliothèque Nationale MS 2824 and MS 2826
Husām al-Dīn Lājīn ibn ʿAbd Allāh al-Dhahabī al-Husāmī al-Tarābulṣī al-Rammāḥ		"Kitāb ʿUmdat al-Mujāhidīn fī Tartīb al-Mayādīn"	Bibliothèque Nationale MS Ar. 6604/1
		"Al-Maqāmah al-Salāḥiyya fī al-Khayl wa-al-Bayṭarah wa-al-Furūsiyya"	Dār al-Kutub al-Miṣriyya MS 81 furūsiyya Taymūr
Shams al-Dīn Muḥammad ibn ʿAbd al-Raḥmān al-Sakhāwī		"Al-Qawl al-Tāmm fī (Faḍl) al-Ramy bi-al-Sihām"	Dār al-Kutub al-Miṣriyya MS 2 m funūn ḥarbiyya
		"Sharḥ al-Maqāmah al-Salāḥiyya fī al-Khayl"	Bibliothèque Nationale MS Ar. 2817
al-Hasan ibn Muḥammad ibn ʿAysūn al-Hanafī al-Sinjārī		"Hidāyat al-Rāmī ilá al-Aghrāḍ wa-al-Marāmī"	Istanbul, Topkapı Sarayı Library MS Ahmet III 2305
Nāṣir al-Dīn Muḥammad ibn ʿAlī al-Qāzānī al-Sughayyir		"Al-Mukhtaṣar al-Muḥarrar"	Istanbul, Topkapı Sarayı Library MS Ahmet III 2620
Nāṣir al-Dīn Muḥammad ibn ʿAlī al-Qāzānī al-Sughayyir		"Al-Hidāyah fī ʿIlm al-Rimāyah"	Bodleian Library MS Huntington 548
Nāṣir al-Dīn Muḥammad ibn ʿAlī al-Qāzānī al-Sughayyir		"Sharḥ al-Qaṣīdah al-Lāmiyya lil-Ustādh Sāliḥ al-Shaghūrī"	Bibliothèque Nationale MS Ar 6604/3
Jalāl al-Dīn ʿAbd al-Raḥmān ibn Abī Bakr al-Suyūṭī		"Ghars al-Anshāb fī al-Ramy bi-al-Nushshāb"	British Library MS Or. 12830
Abū Muḥammad ʿAbd al-Raḥmān Aḥmad al-Tabarī		untitled fragment	British Library MS Or. 9265/1
Abū Muḥammad ʿAbd al-Raḥmān Aḥmad al-Tabarī		"Kitāb al-Wāḍiḥ (fī ʿIlm al-Ramy)"	British Library MS Or. 9454
Taybughā al-Ashrafī al-Baklamīshī al-Yunānī		"Kitāb al-Ramy wa-al-Rukūb" (added title)	Bibliothèque Nationale MS 6160
Husayn ibn ʿAbd al-Raḥmān al-Yūnīnī		"Al-Nihāyah fī ʿIlm al-Rimāyah"	Istanbul, Ayasofya Library MS 2952
Abū al-Naṣr al-Qāsim ibn ʿAlī ibn Husayn al-Hāshimī al-Zaynabī		"Al-Qawānīn al-Sulṭāniyya fī al-Sayd"	Istanbul, Fatih Mosque Library MS 3508
		"Al-Furūsiyya" (untitled fragment)	British Library MS 9015
		hunting treatise (untitled)	Alexandria, Egypt, Maktabat al-Baladiyya MS 1201/1

== Fāris ==
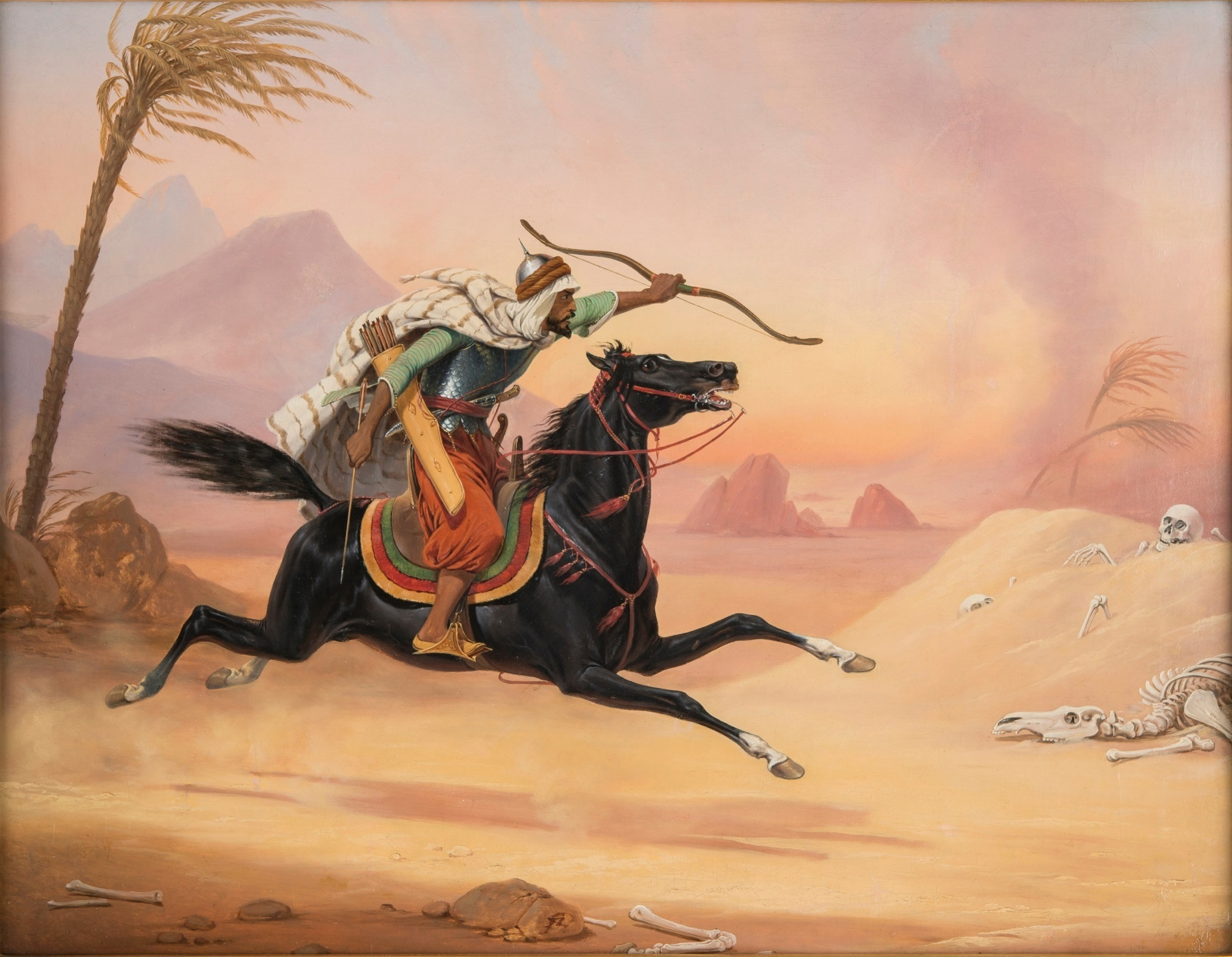
Faris, by January Suchodolski (1836).

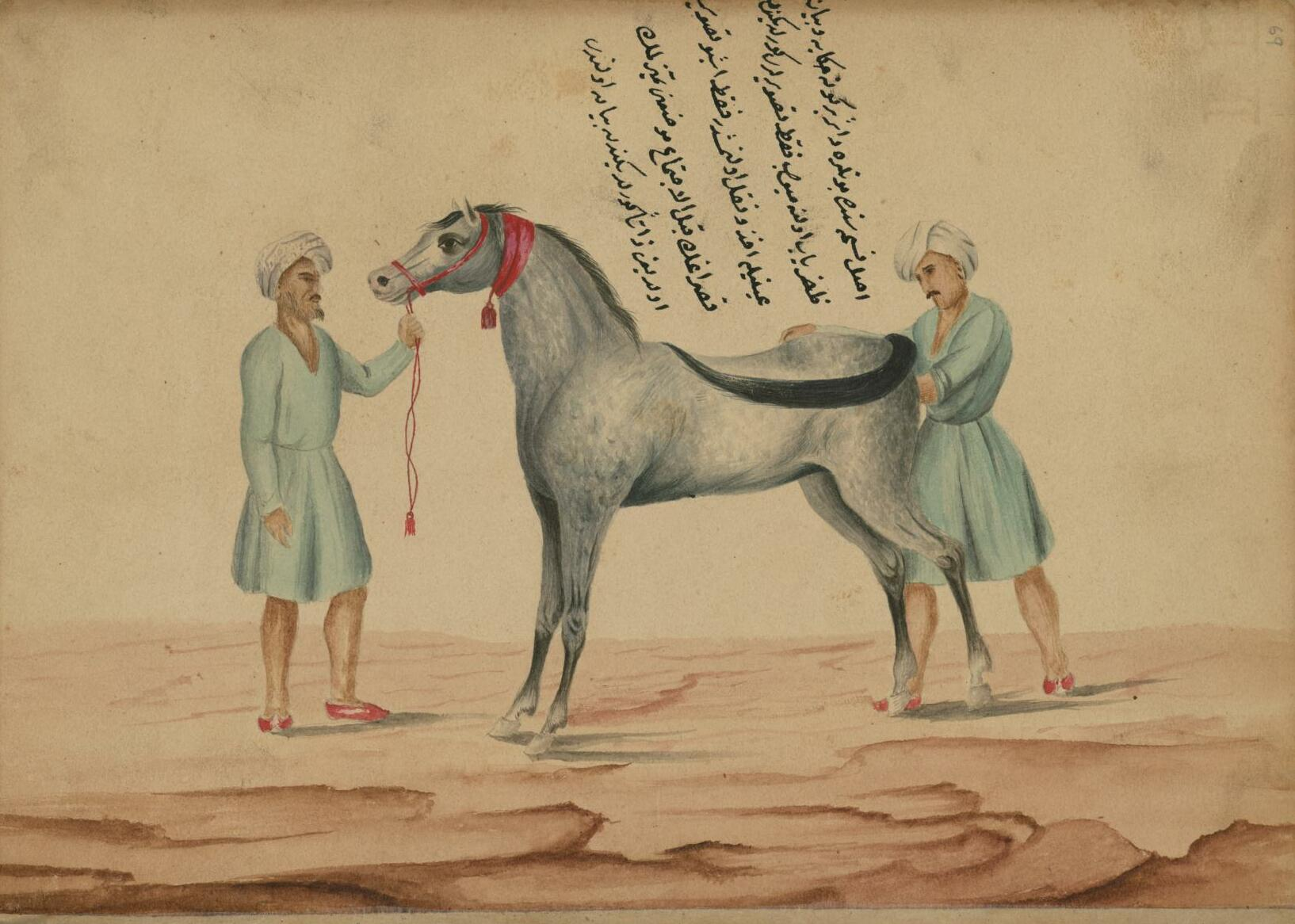
Illustration from an Ottoman copy of Tuhfat ül-farisin fi ahval-i huyul il-mucahidin by Ahmed 'Ata Tayyarzade.

The term furūsiyya, much like its parallel chivalry in the West, also appears to have developed a wider meaning of "martial ethos". Arabic furusiyya and European chivalry have both influenced each other as a means of a warrior code for the knights of both cultures.

The term fāris (فارس) for "horseman" consequently adopted qualities comparable to the Western knight or chevalier ("cavalier"). This could include free men (such as Usama ibn Munqidh) or unfree professional warriors, like ghulāms and mamluks. The Mamluk-era soldier was trained in the use of various weapons such as the saif, spear, lance, javelin, club, bow and arrows, and tabarzin (Mamluk bodyguards are known as tabardariyya), as well as wrestling.

== See also ==
- Hippiatrica
- Shalihotra Samhita
- Bem cavalgar
- History of veterinary medicine
- Horses in the Middle Ages
- Horses in warfare
- Aswaran
- Futuwwa
- Ayyār
