= Hunting by cheetah =

Historical hunting method

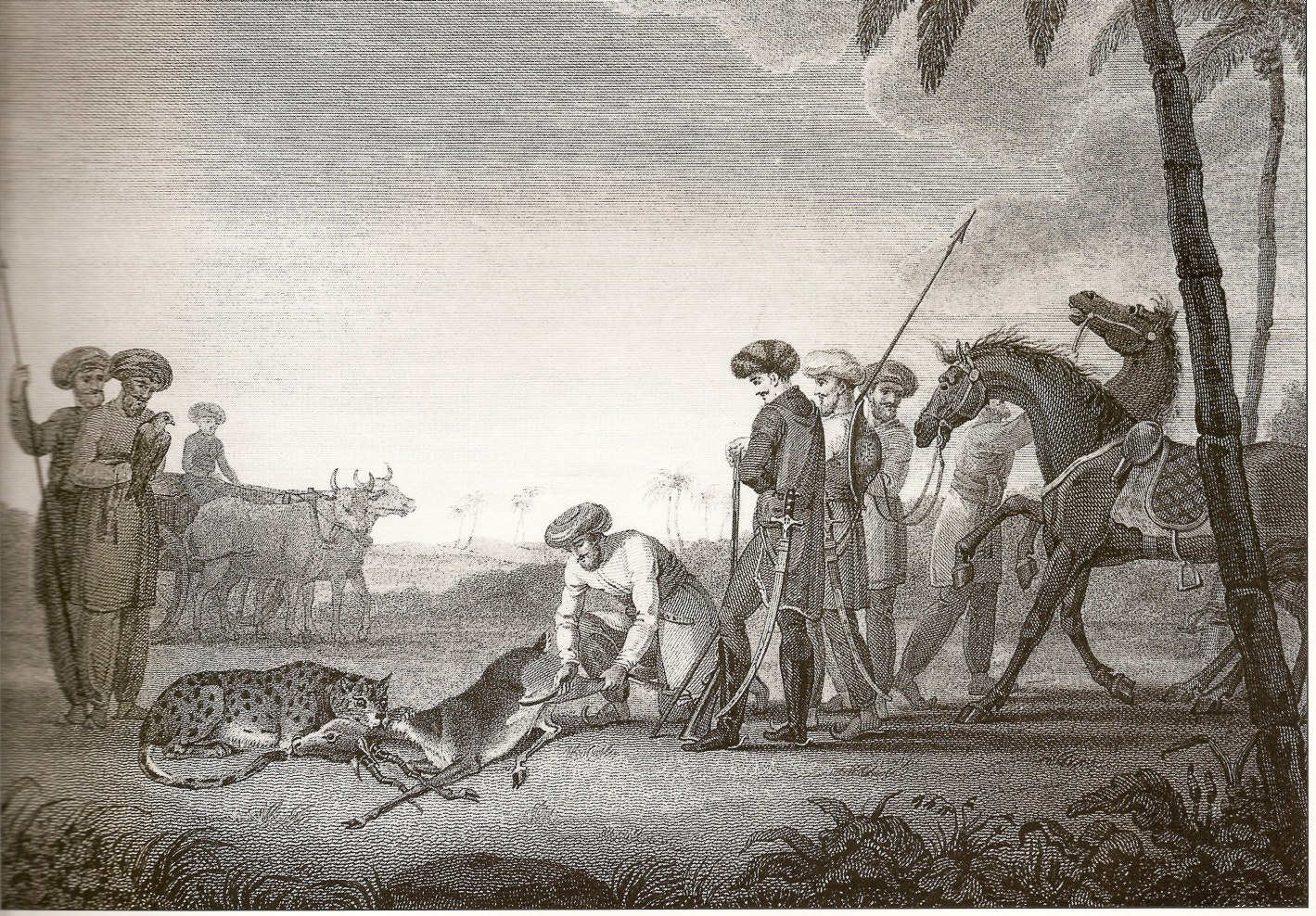
Mughal Empire hunters using a cheetah to catch a blackbuck, Gujarat, 1812. Illustration by James Forbes.

The use of tame cheetahs as hunting companion animals dates back to antiquity, but is no longer widely practiced. Cheetahs are relatively easy to tame, which made them popular among royals and elites, although they struggle to breed in captivity. Because of this, cheetahs were typically taken from the wild, a practice that contributed to the extirpation of the Asiatic cheetah in much of Asia. A long period of global decline in the practice began in the seventeenth century.

The last recorded instances of royal cheetah hunts took place in India between the 1920s and 1940s. Cheetah hunts continue to take place on rare occasions, and tame cheetahs are still kept as exotic pets by some.

== History ==
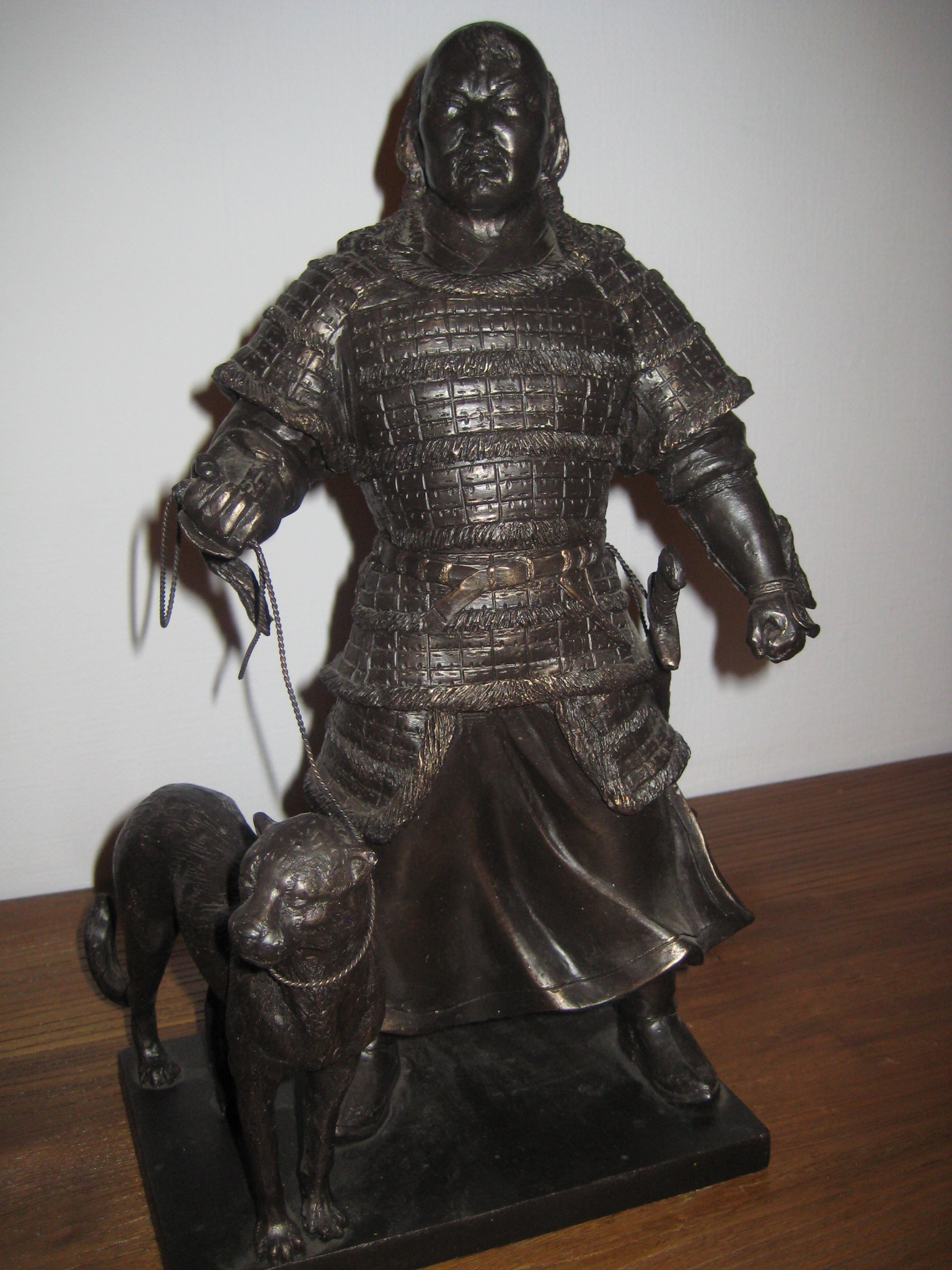
A statue of a Mongol hunter with a tame cheetah

Tame cheetahs were imported to Ancient Egypt from the South, and it has been speculated that ancient Egyptians used them to hunt, although there is no evidence to support this. The Byzantines may have referred to the cheetah as the λεοπάρδος leopardos or λεοντόπαρδος leontopardos and believing it to be a hybrid between a leopard and a lion because of the difficulty of breeding them in captivity. A Roman hunting cheetah is depicted in a 4th-century mosaic from Lod, Israel. Cheetahs continued to be used into the Byzantine period of the Roman Empire, with "hunting pards" being mentioned in sixteenth and seventeenth-century vernacular versions of the Alexander Romance. The Roman poet Luxorius recorded that a cheetah hunt took place in the court of the Vandal king Thrasamund in Carthage.

=== In Asia ===
Hunting by cheetah likely originated in ancient Persia, India, or Afghanistan. Persian literature states that cheetahs were first tamed for hunting during the time of the Sasanian Empire. The epic poem Shahnameh by Ferdowsi states that the king Bharām Gūr used cheetahs to hunt in the fifth century, and that they were tamed for the first time by the legendary king Tahmuras. Meanwhile, some Arab traditions hold that hunting by cheetah began prior to the Hijrah in the fifth century. Hunting cheetahs are known in pre-Islamic Arabic art from Yemen. Hunting with cheetahs became more prevalent toward the seventh century AD. In the Middle East, cheetahs would accompany the nobility to hunts in a special seat on the back of the saddle. Taming was an elaborate process and could take a year to complete. Hunting with cheetahs may have taken place in the Tang dynasty in China, as evidenced by a painting of a cheetah being carried on horseback in the tomb of Li Shu. Chinese use of hunting cheetahs continued into the Ming dynasty. Additionally, in Central Asia, Marco Polo wrote that Kublai Khan used "big leopards [cheetahs] well trained for hunting" in the thirteenth century. Tomb figurines from the Mongol empire, dating back to the reign of Kublai Khan (1260–1294), represent cheetahs on horseback.

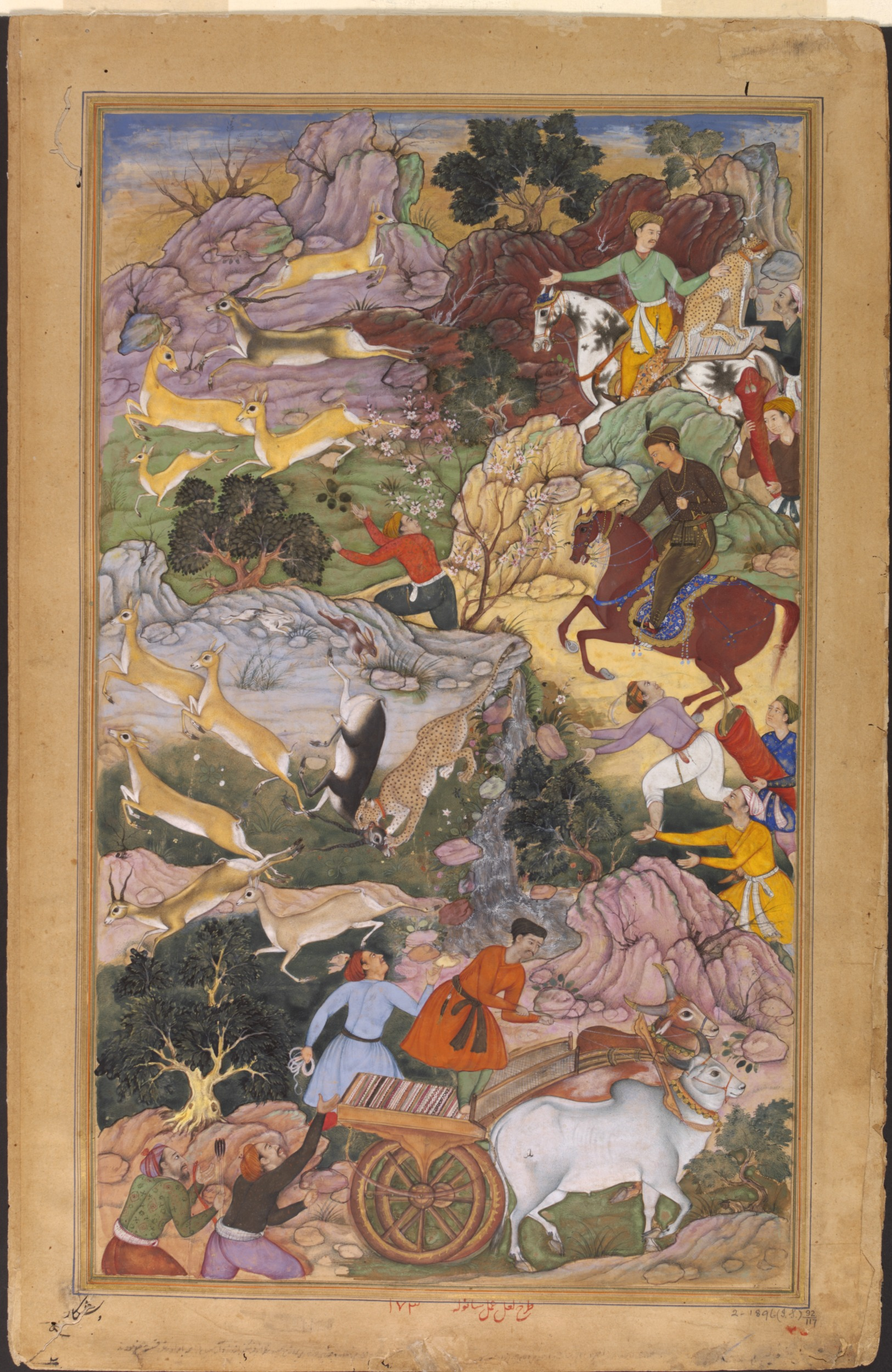
Akbar hunting blackbuck (Akbarnama, c. 1590s)

The first written evidence of hunting by cheetah in India appears in the thirteenth century. Indian Mughal art from the late sixteenth century depicted the emperor Akbar hunting with cheetahs, and it was written that he owned one thousand of them at one time. Mughal rulers trained cheetahs in a similar way as the western Asians and used them to hunt game.

=== In Europe ===
Hunting by cheetah in medieval Europe gained prominence in the thirteenth century and declined in the sixteenth and seventeenth centuries. The earliest written records of cheetahs in Western Europe are from the twelfth century. The French monk Rodulfus Tortarius recorded having seen, between 1096 and 1099, a chained leopard carried on horseback in a royal procession for the King of England in Caen, Normandy. The fact that the cheetah was tame enough to ride a horse suggests that it was trained for hunting, although it is not known for certain. Scholars generally agree that the first person to hunt with cheetahs in Europe was Frederick II, Holy Roman Emperor, who imported the cats from Tunisia.

Frederick II kept records about his cheetah keepers, which he called leoparderii. He likely owned many cheetahs, as he ordered 60 carpets specifically for his leoparderii in 1260. The troubadour Guilhem Figueira criticized Frederick for spending so much time hunting with his cheetahs ("Pero qar vai chazan / per bosc et per eissartz / ab cas et ab leopartz?", "But where does he go hunting / by forest and by clearing / with dogs and with leopards?"). Frederick sent cheetahs as gifts to other rulers such as Henry III of England. Charles I of Anjou also maintained hunting cheetahs and he had five leoparderii named Domenico, Pasquale, Isa, Elia, and Bulfetto. Charles I's leoparderii were under the authority of a Saracen named Salem who served as the "master of the cheetah-handlers of the king".

Cheetah hunting also took place in medieval Spain, possibly having been adopted from Muslim tradition. Trained cheetahs were kept in royal menageries in Aragon and Navarre, and Ferdinand I of Aragon mentioned hunting with cheetahs in a 1412 letter. Additionally, James I of Cyprus kept twenty-four hunting cheetahs. Francis I of France and his son Henry II were the final French monarchs to hunt with cheetahs. At the end of the sixteenth century, Henry III killed all of the wild animals in the French court. The last attested record of hunting by cheetah in early modern Europe was by Leopold I, Holy Roman Emperor, who owned two tame cheetahs that were gifted to him by the Ottoman Sultan, at the end of the sixteenth century.

=== Decline and modern period ===
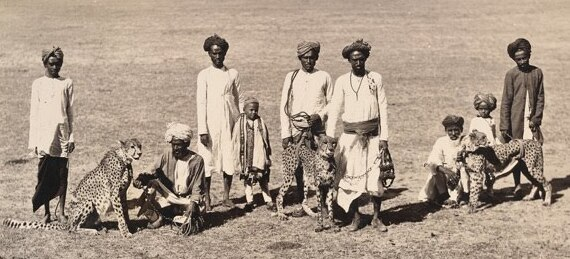
Three cheetahs with handlers in Vadodara, c. 1890s

A long period of global decline in hunting by cheetah began in the seventeenth century. The Ottoman court removed its crew of cheetah handlers from 1686 to 1687. Western travelers such as Jean-Baptiste Tavernier, François Bernier, Adam Olearius, and Jean Chardin recorded encountering cheetah hunts in Persia and India in the seventeenth century after its decline in the Ottoman Empire. The very last recorded royal hunts in India took place from the 1920s to 1940s. During this same period, the Asiatic cheetah disappeared from India, the Middle East, Egypt, and the Maghreb. The subspecies is now critically endangered and survives only in Iran.

There have been some instances of cheetahs being used to hunt deer in modern times, with recorded hunts having been posted on the Internet. Cheetahs are still kept as exotic pets by some, particularly in the Persian Gulf nations, although these cheetahs are typically illegally captured from the wild.

== Hunting practices ==
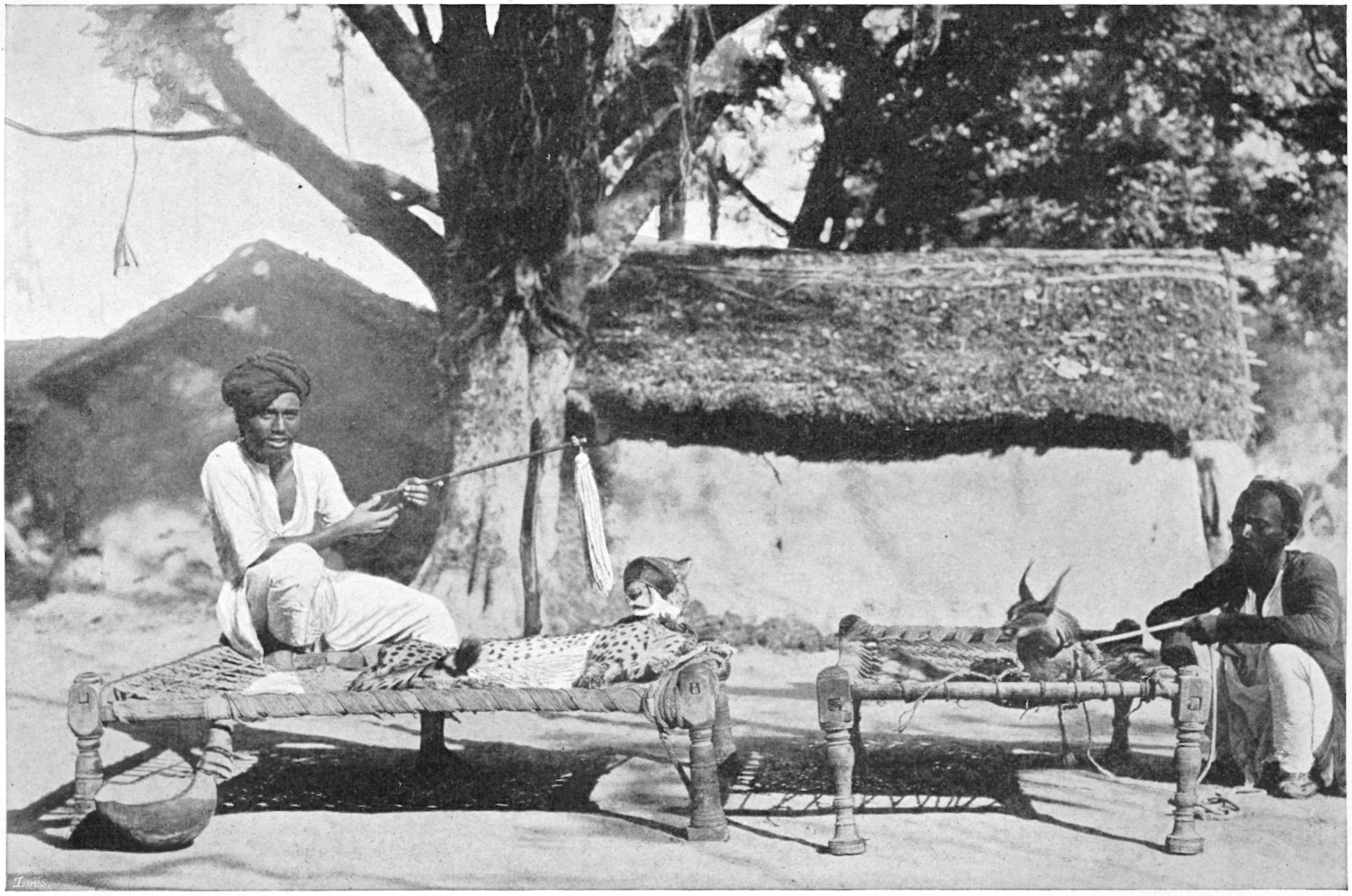
Hunters with a hooded tame cheetah and a caracal in Rajasthan, 1903, photographed by Kurt Boeck

The use of cheetahs in hunting is thoroughly described in several Arab texts including Kitab al-maṣāyid wa'l-maṭārid (the treatise of the polymath Kušāǧim, tenth century), the Kitāb al-bayzara (written by the falconer of Al-Aziz Billah, tenth century), the hunting encyclopedia of Isa ibn Ali al-Asadi (thirteenth century), and the anonymously written al-Mansur's Book on Hunting (thirteenth century). Ibn Mangli wrote an abridged version of al-Asadi's encyclopedia in the fourteenth century, and his works provide much information on the training of cheetahs. He wrote that cheetahs were trained similarly to falcons, and he listed different breeds used for hunting. He stated that the best hunting cheetahs came from the western Euphrates, Syria, Jordan, and Egypt. Keepers of hunting cheetahs were known as fahhādīyah or fahhādūn, and they were under the authority of the amīr šikār, who was responsible for all the hunting animals in the Sultan's court. The fahhādīyah had to capture and tame female cheetahs for hunting.

Cheetahs were tamed by first depriving them of sleep and food in order to foster submission to humans. They were then fettered and hooded (similarly to hunting falcons) for several weeks. After this, they were acclimated to human contact by being kept secure in a busy street, where they would be exposed to the noise and movement of humans. They would then be taken for walks on a leash. The cheetahs would then be trained to jump onto a wooden horse to become accustomed to riding horseback. Finally, they were trained to capture and kill game that had been first exhausted by handlers.

In the Mughal Empire, hunting cheetahs were transported to hunting fields in carts, cages, or riding on horseback behind their keepers. After their hoods were removed, the cheetahs were released to chase down prey such as hares, deer, or gazelles. Hunting was sometimes done as a spectacle for observers who stayed inside of a luxurious tent and watched hunts within a fenced-in hunting field. Thomas of Cantimpré, author of De natura rerum, wrote in the thirteenth century that a cheetah could be tamed for hunting "despite its cruelty". However, he noted that if it did not catch its prey in three or four bounds, it could become frustrated and attack its handler or the handler's hunting dogs. Bartholomaeus Anglicus also wrote that cheetahs could become upset if they did not catch their prey in three or four bounds, although he did not mention that they could be tamed for hunting. The hunting treatise of Moamyn states that hunting cheetahs are to be fed with the haunches of sheep.

== See also ==
- Coursing
- Human interaction with cats
