= Baghdad School =

Schools of Later Abbasid era

- مدرسة بغداد
- Other names: Arab School المدرسة العربية
- Established: late 12th century
- Location: Baghdad, Kufa, Wasit, Basra, Abbasid Caliphate
- Campus: Urban
- Language: Arabic

The Baghdad School, also known as the Arab school, was a relatively short-lived yet influential school of Islamic art developed during the late 12th century in the capital Baghdad of the ruling Abbasid Caliphate. The movement had largely died out by the early 14th century, five decades following the invasion of the Mongols in 1258 and the downfall of the Abbasids' rule, and would eventually be replaced by stylistic movements from the Mongol tradition. The Baghdad School is particularly noted for its distinctive approach to manuscript illustration. The faces depicted in illustrations were individualized and expressive, with the scenes often incorporating realistic features of everyday life from the period. This stylistic movement used strong, bright colors, and employed a balanced sense of design and a decorative quality, with illustrations often lacking traditional frames and appearing between lines of text on manuscript pages.

== Background ==
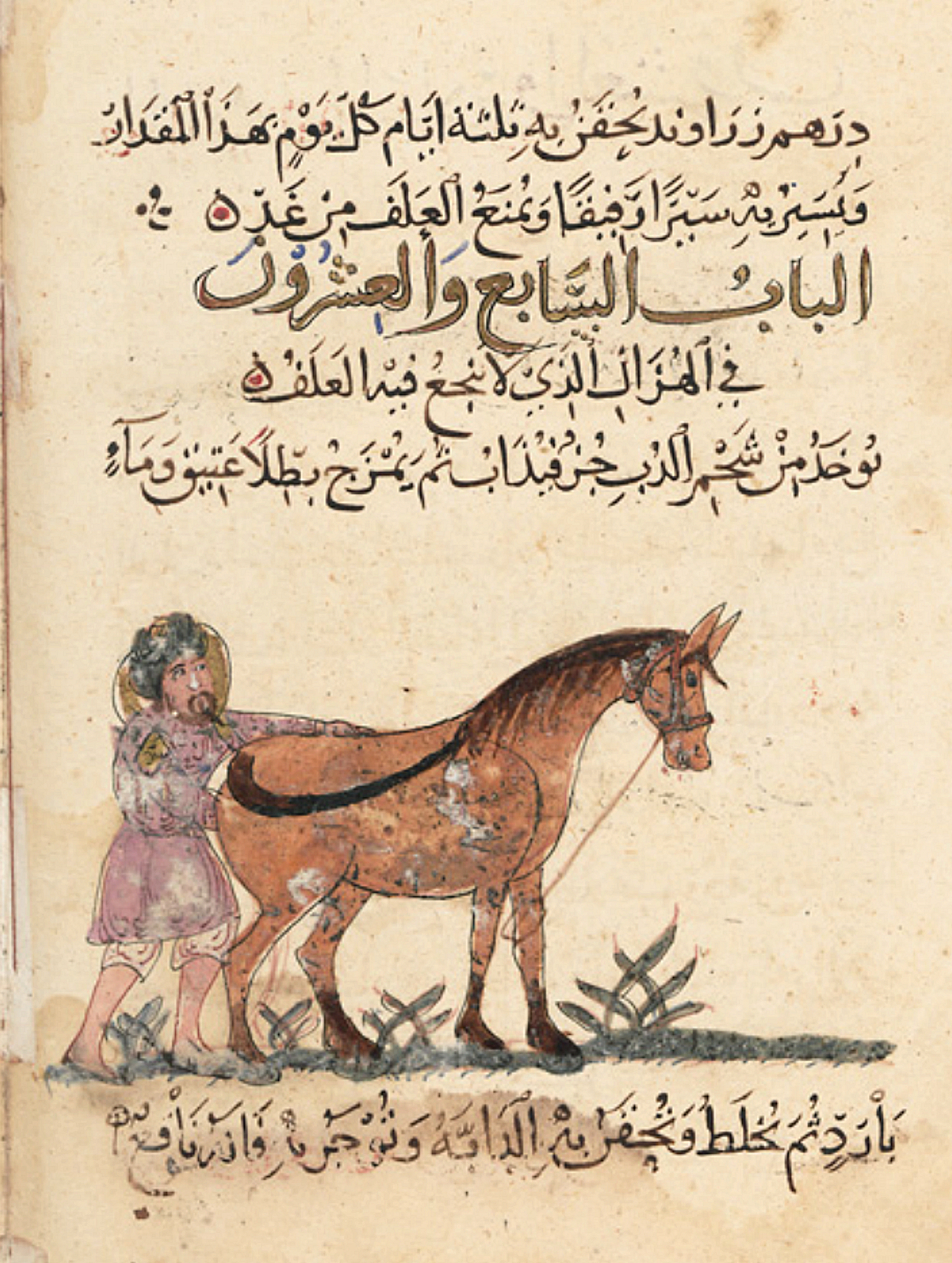
The Kitab al-baytarah is the only manuscript whose place of production is securely attributed to Baghdad and dated to 1209-1210 through its colophon. Grooming a horse, Kitab al-baytara, 1210, Topkapi Museum.

The Baghdad School of art is noted for its manuscript artwork. The school consisted of calligraphers, illustrators, transcribers and translators, who collaborated to produce illuminated manuscripts derived from non-Arabic sources. The characteristic Baghdad School artistic style, which features sprightly characters bearing highly expressive faces and hand gestures (rather than stereotypical people), reached its peak in the first half of the 13th-century, although some examples can be identified at earlier periods. Illustrations in this style represent a skilful blend of Byzantine, Persian and Arab features.

Very few illuminated copies of the Qu'ran from this period have survived, but a number of secular manuscripts are still extant. These manuscripts are primarily scientific treatises or social commentaries.

The descriptor, "Baghdad School", was coined by the French Orientalist, Eustache De Lorey, in 1938, when he curated an exhibition of illustrations from Maqamat Badi' az-Zaman al-Hamadhani for the Bibliothèque nationale de France. More recent art historians and curators prefer to use the terms Mesopotamian School, while other scholars have suggested that the term should be replaced with something broader, such as the Arab School of Miniatures, because its exponents were not just confined to Baghdad and Iraq.

Actually, the Kitab al-baytarah is the only manuscript whose place of production is securely attributed to Baghdad and dated to 1209 through its colophon, which makes it a key work in trying to define a "Baghdad school" of illustrated manuscripts during the pre-Mongol period (the Mongol Siege of Baghdad dates to 1258). The 1209 edition mentioning Baghdad is in the Egyptian National Library and Archives (Khalil Agha F8). The other, dated 1210, does not mention Baghdad, but is considered a copy of the 1209 edition, and was made by the same calligrapher.

The Kitab al-baytarah has been used as an artistic reference to try to attribute a famous 1237 CE Maqamat al-Hariri manuscript (BNF Arabe 5847) to Baghdad as well. The attempt is based on a certain level of artistic similarity, but this attribution remains uncertain, and the location of the BNF Arabe 5847 remains unsure and it can only said to have been made between Syria and Iraq in 1237 CE.

Another illustrated manuscript which is tentatively attributed to pre-Mongol Baghdad is the dispersed 1224 Dioscorides (De Materia Medica 1224). Here again, attribution to Baghdad remains tentative, and a more cautious attribution, such as "Iraq or Northern Jazira, possibly Baghdad" is often preferred.

== Translations and illustrations of De Materia Medica ==
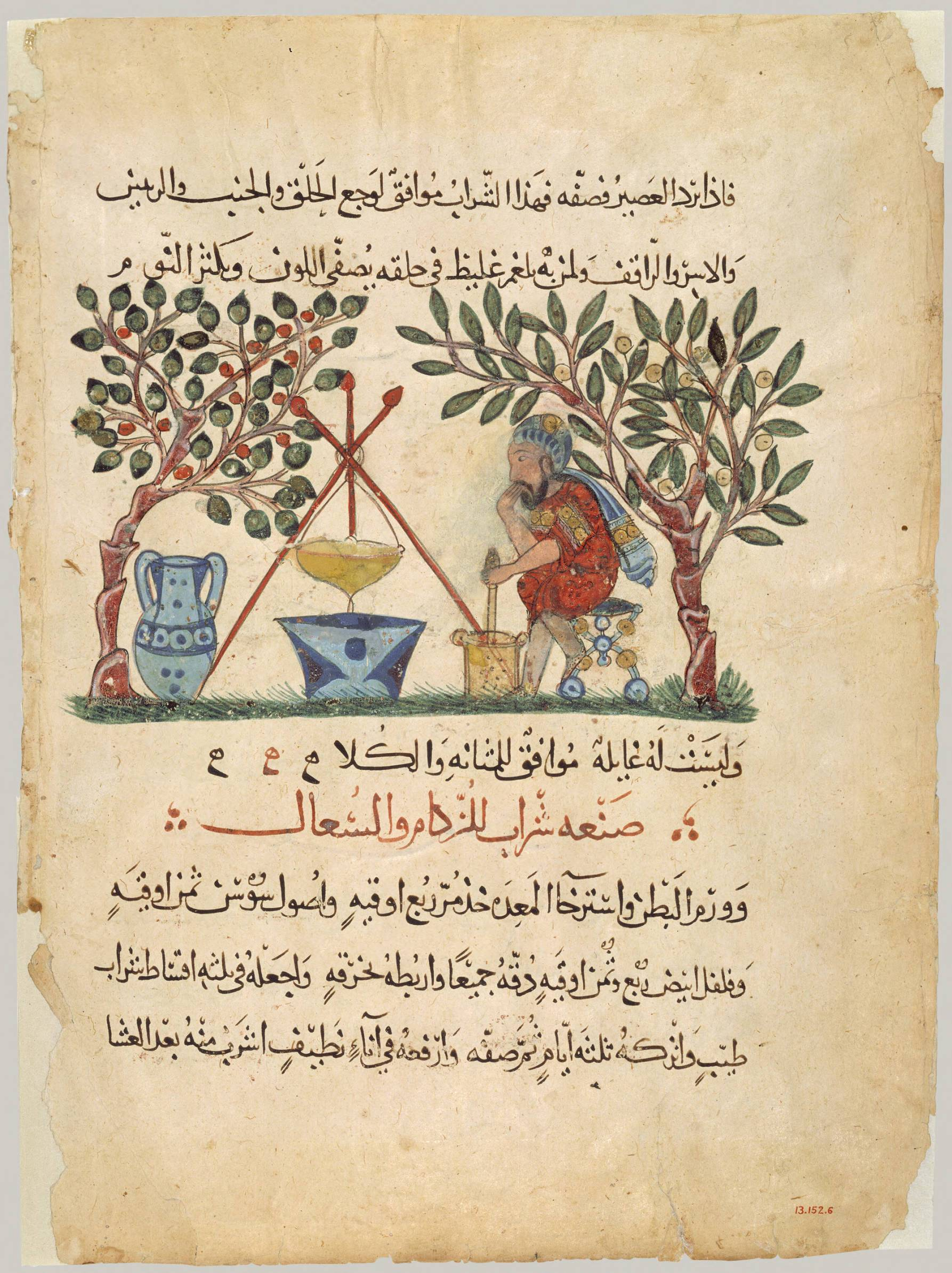
“Preparation of Medicine from Honey," translated and illustrated from Dioscorides, possibly by the "Baghdad School"

The Greek materia medica, in particular herbals and bestiaries, which described the characteristics and medicinal uses of various plants and animals found in the Mediterranean world, were among the books transcribed. Several Arabic translations of Dioscorides' work, De Materia Medica have been discovered. Dioscorides' treatise was considered especially important, and remains one of the best examples of manuscript translation and illustration produced by the Baghdad School. Dioscorides was a renowned Greek physician, herbalist, and pharmacist serving the Roman Empire and its armies during the first century CE, whose work gained influence throughout the medieval Islamic world.

Of these, a manuscript known as the Mashhad Manuscript, originally believed to be 13th-century work, has been reassessed and now dated to between 1152 and 1176, providing one of the earliest examples of illustrations in the style of the Baghdad School. Another early example of these translations is the translation and work probably by Abdallah ibn al-Fadl. The illustrations were considered especially important, and it remains one of the best examples of manuscript translation and illustration produced by the Baghdad School. Dioscorides was a renowned Greek physician, herbalist, and pharmacist serving the Roman Empire and its armies during the first century CE, whose work gained influence throughout the medieval Islamic world.

Among the illustrated manuscript leaves of the 13th-century Dioscorides' Materia Medica is the page entitled, “Physician Preparing an Elixir," also referred to by The Heilbrunn Timeline of Art History as “Preparation of Medicine from Honey.” It is dated 1224 CE and was found in Iraq or Northern Jazira, possibly Baghdad. The page depicts an illustration of a bearded physician with a colorful blue headscarf and red clothing seated on an ornamental stool. He is mixing a yellow pot with a ladle while overlooking a yellow cauldron hanging from a red tripod above a wide blue container. His other hand is raised up towards his mouth. A large blue jug lies to the left of the tripod. Two overhanging trees on either side of the scene bear leaves and two different types of what appear to be colorful fruit or flowers—red on the left and yellow on the right. The ground below the scene is covered with green grass, however there is no background depicted in the illustration thus reducing the sense of depth. The style of illustration depicted on this manuscript leaf is thus an excellent example of the Baghdad School: the colors are bright and distinctive, the objects depicted in the scene have a balanced, symmetrical design with the trees framing the illustration, and finally, the man's face appears to be in a state of deep, expressive contemplation. The scene itself has a realistic and personalized quality to it, depicting a physician in a natural setting as he prepares a medicinal mixture containing honey for his patients, and yet also has ornamental characteristics with its design and choice of colors—another distinctive feature of the Baghdad School.

Illustrations and text from the 13th-century Arabic translation of De Materia Medica

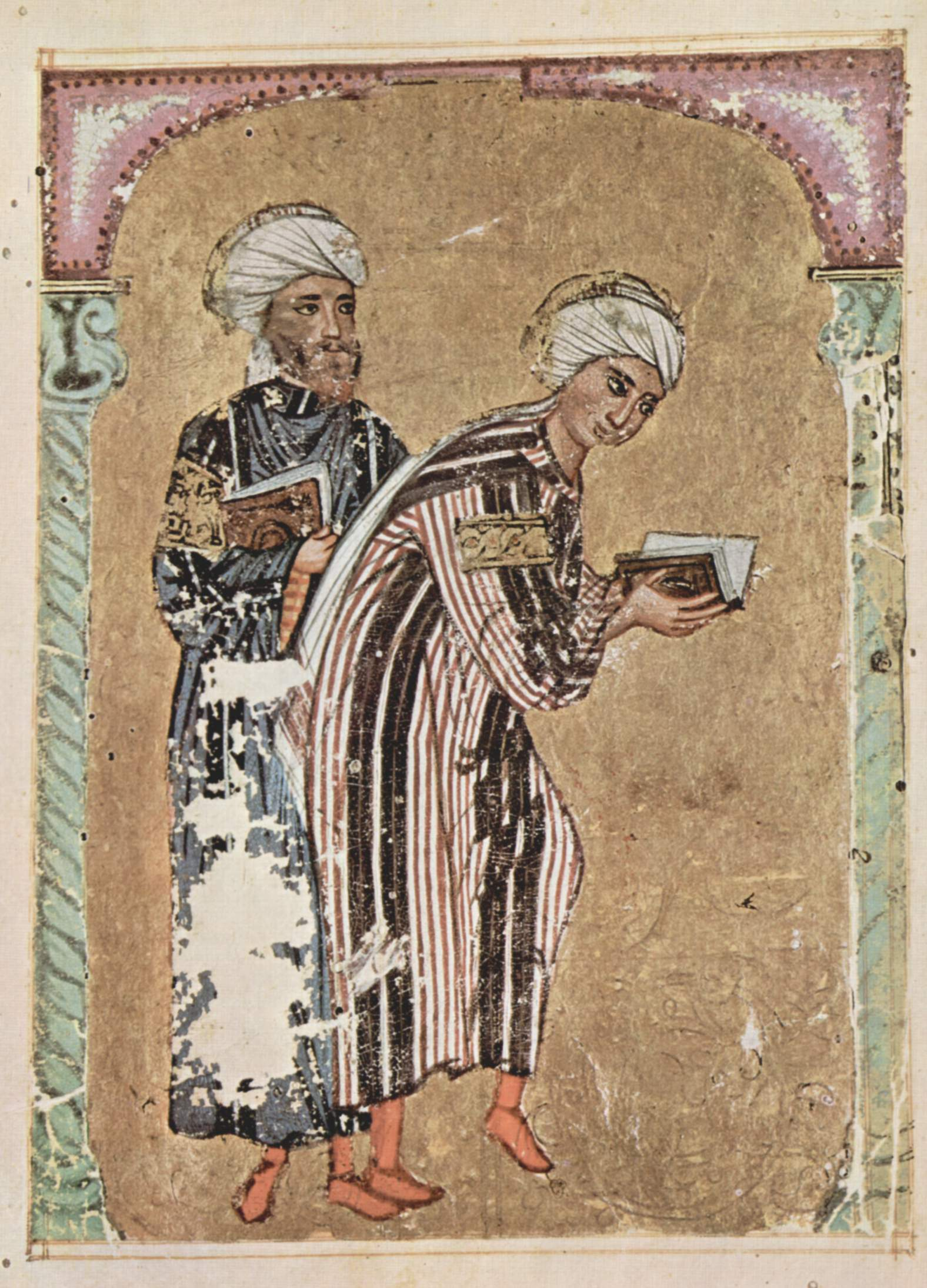

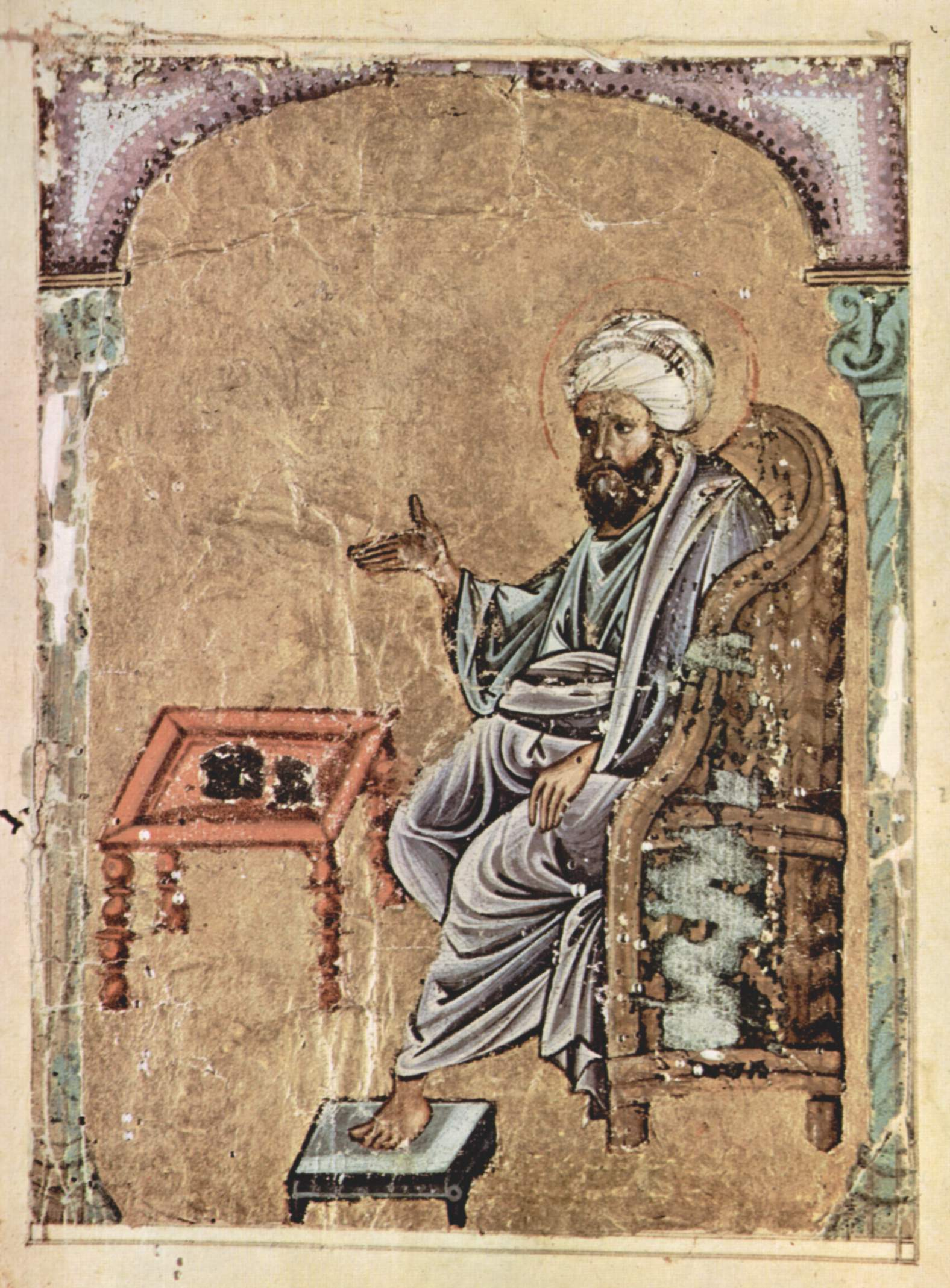

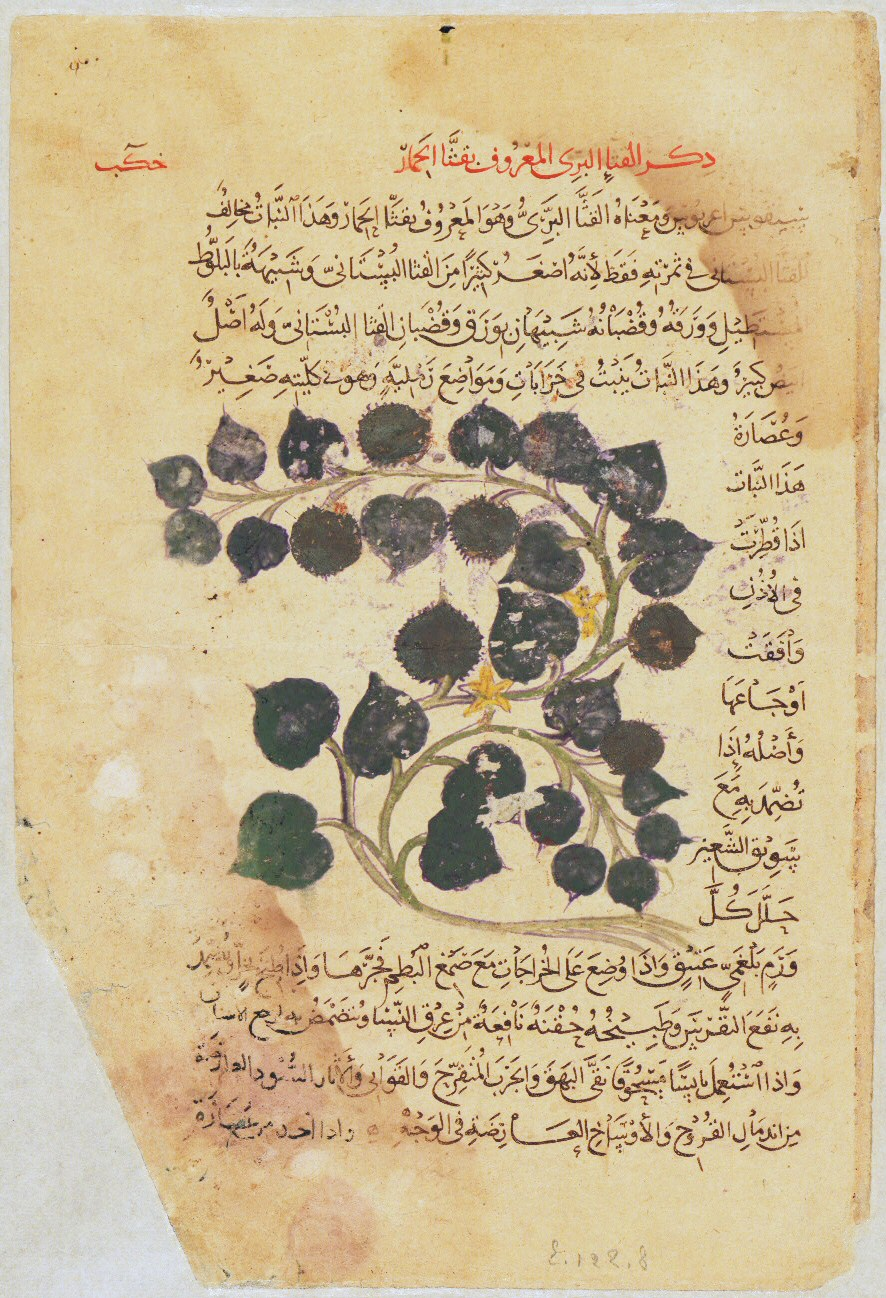

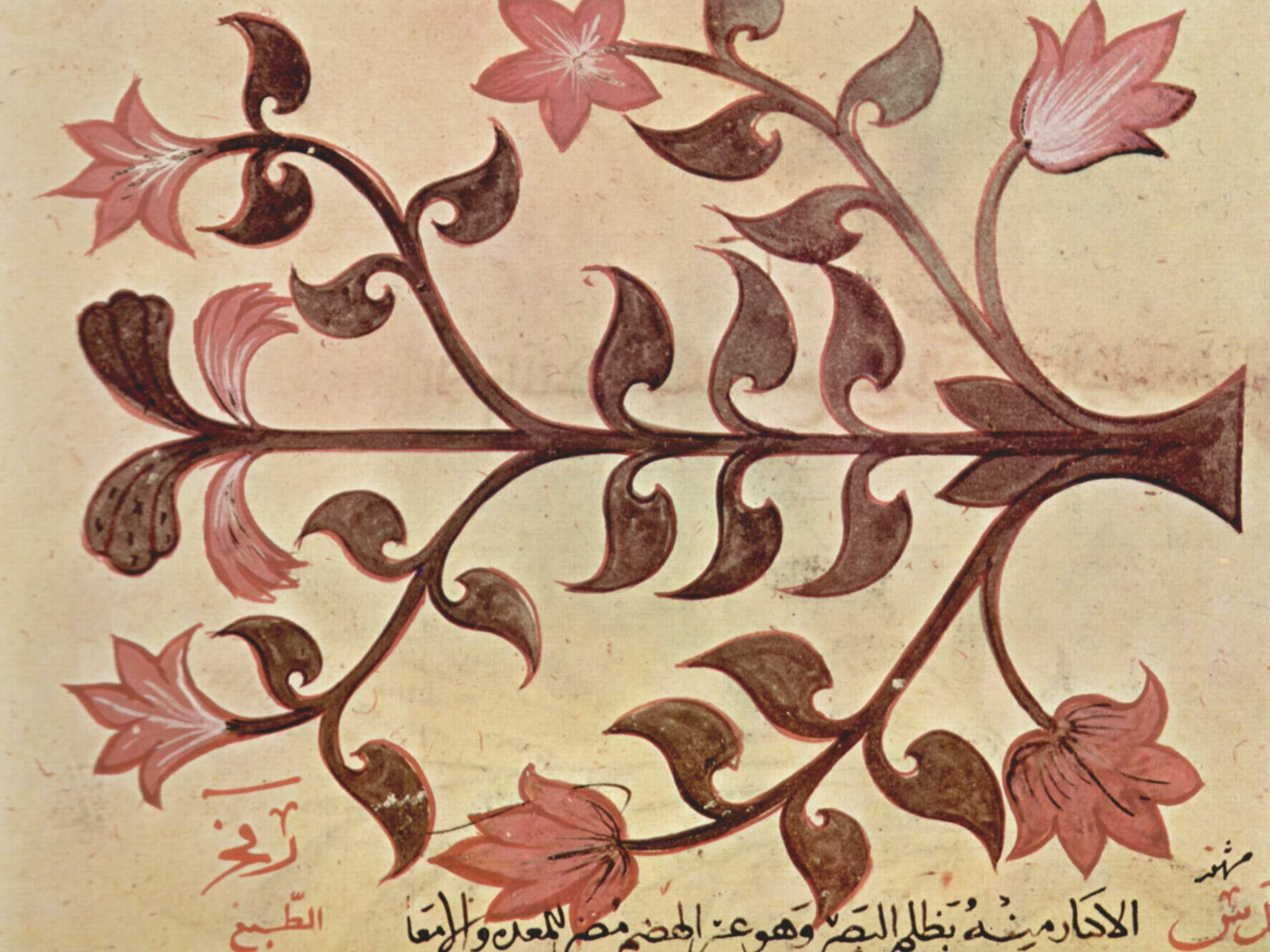

== Transcription and illustration of Maqamat ==
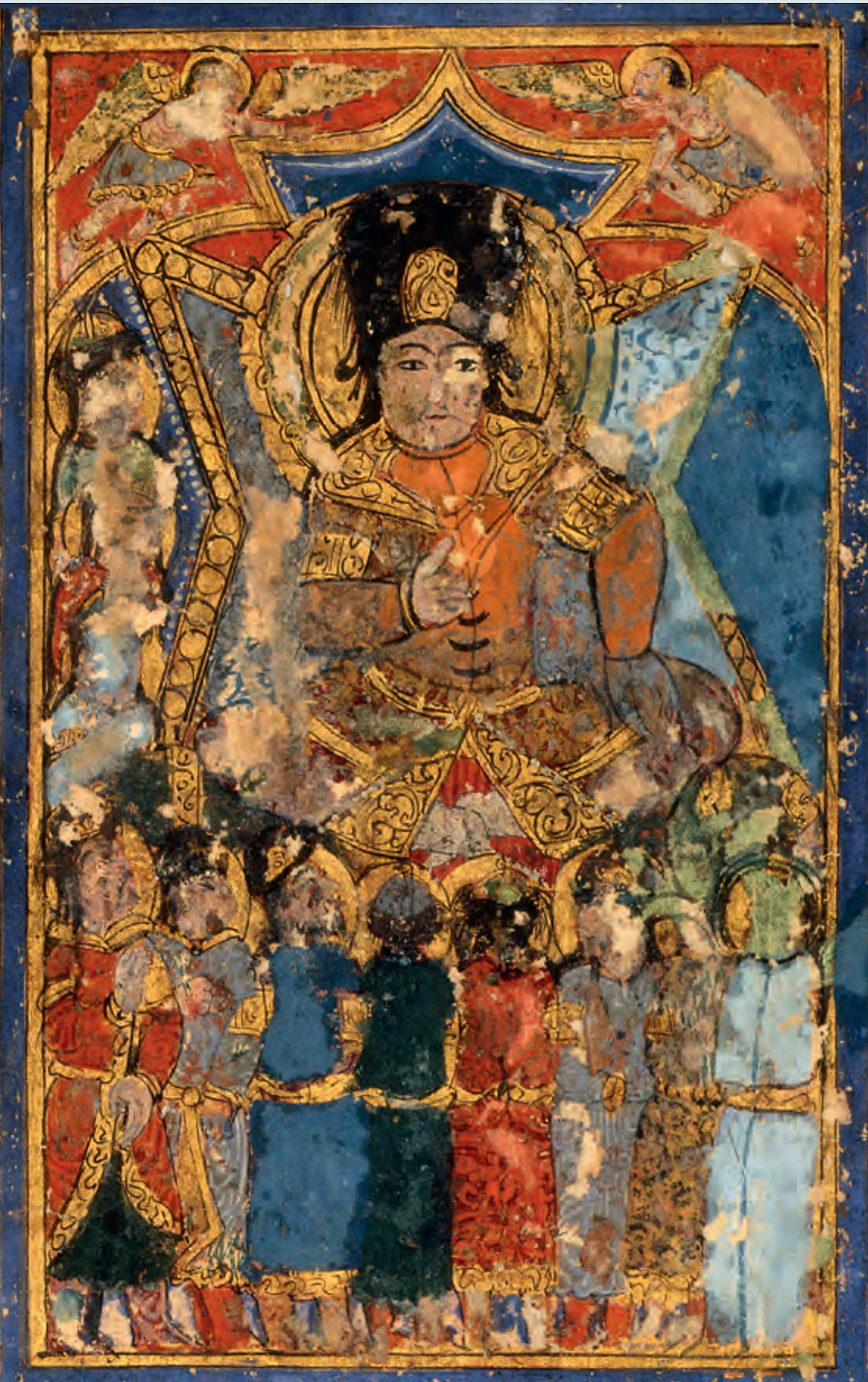
A dignitary in Turkic dress: long braids, sharbush fur hat, boots, close-fitting coat. He may be an amir.

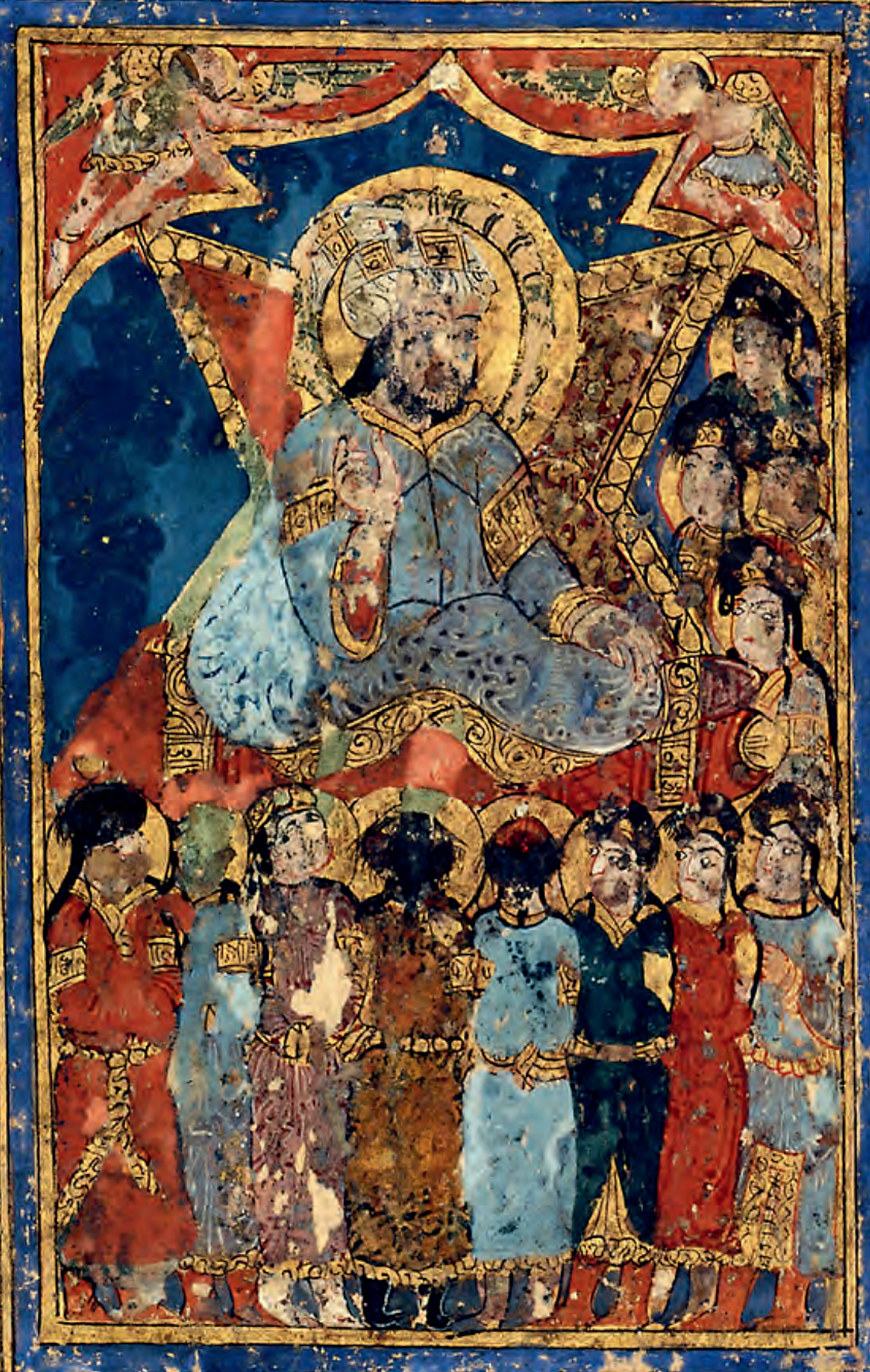
A local dignitary in loose-fitting dress and turban, possibly Al-Hariri of Basra himself.

Frontispiece illustrations from the Maqamat al-Hariri, (1237 edition).

The 1237 edition of the Maqamat al-Hariri is an illuminated manuscript created by Yahya ibn Mahmud al-Wasiti in 1237. This is probably the most applauded edition of the Maqamat. It may have been created in Baghdad, based on some stylistic parallels with the Kitab al-baytarah which securely emanated from this city, but this attribution remains quite conjectural. Still the name of the Abbasid Caliph al-Mustansir appears in one of the paintings (fol. 164v), which does create a certain connection.

This maqama manuscript is currently kept in the Bibliothèque nationale de France in Paris (BNF Arabe 5847). It is also known as the Schefer Ḥarīrī.

According to its colophon, the manuscript was copied in the year 634 of the Islamic calendar (equivalent to 1237 in the Western calendar). The manuscript details a series of tales regarding the adventures of the fictional character Abu Zayd of Saruj who travels and deceives those around him with his skill in the Arabic language to earn rewards.

The twin frontispieces show one individual in Arab dress, who may be the author himself, and a majestic ruler in Seljuk-type Turkic military dress (long braids, fur hat, boots, fitting coat), who may be the potentate the manuscript was dedicated to.

The book is written in red and black ink, and supplemented by 99 miniatures. These miniatures depict a wide variety of scenes from the Maqamat and from every day life. Most are decorated with gold.

Other illustrations by Yahya Al-Wasiti from al-Hariri's Maqamat

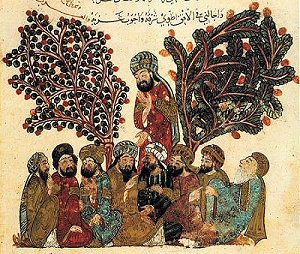

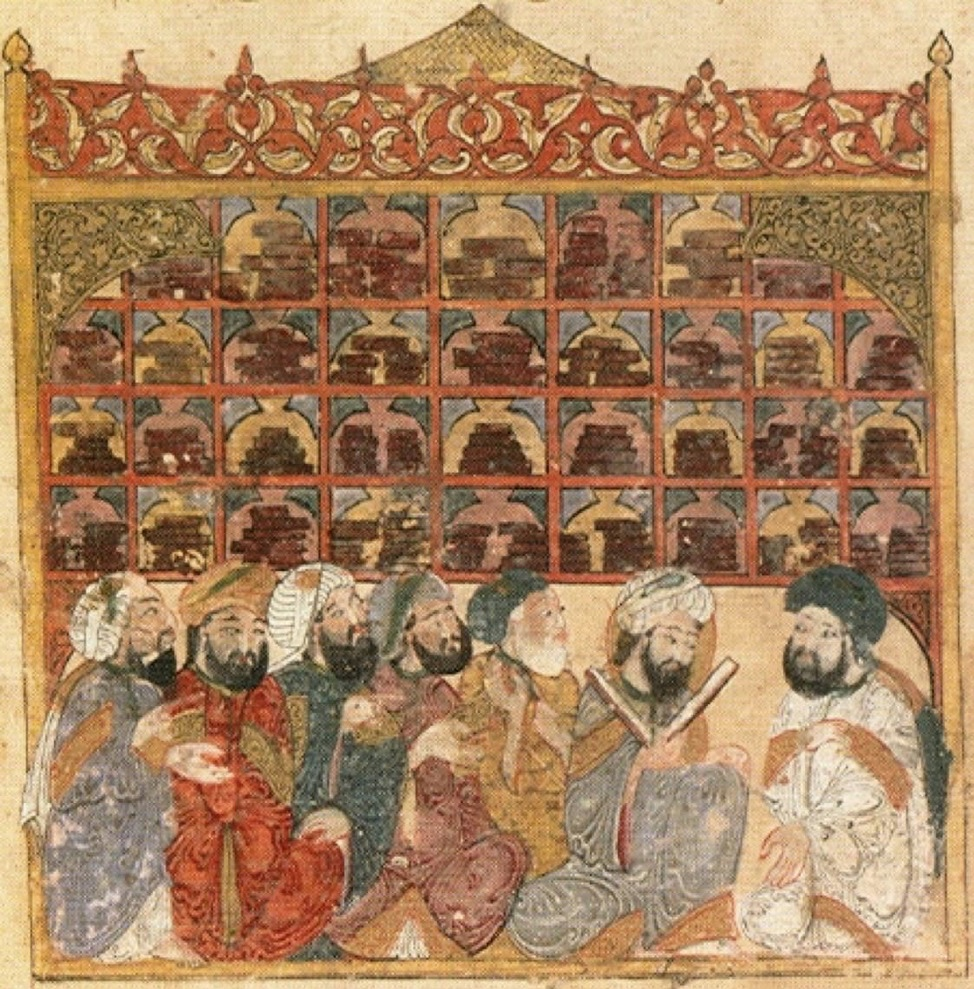

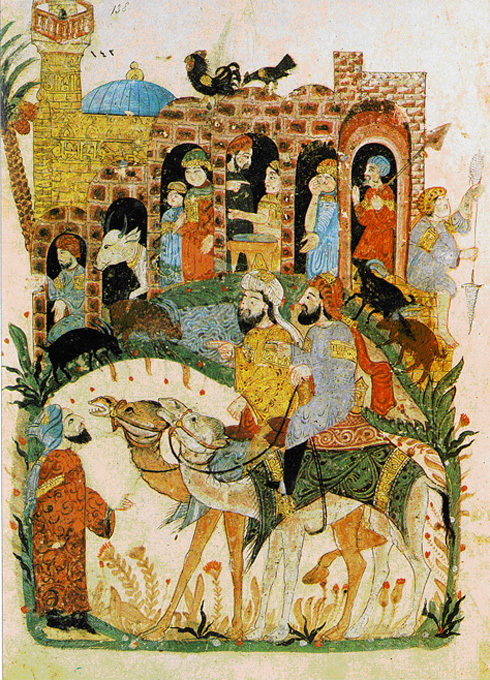

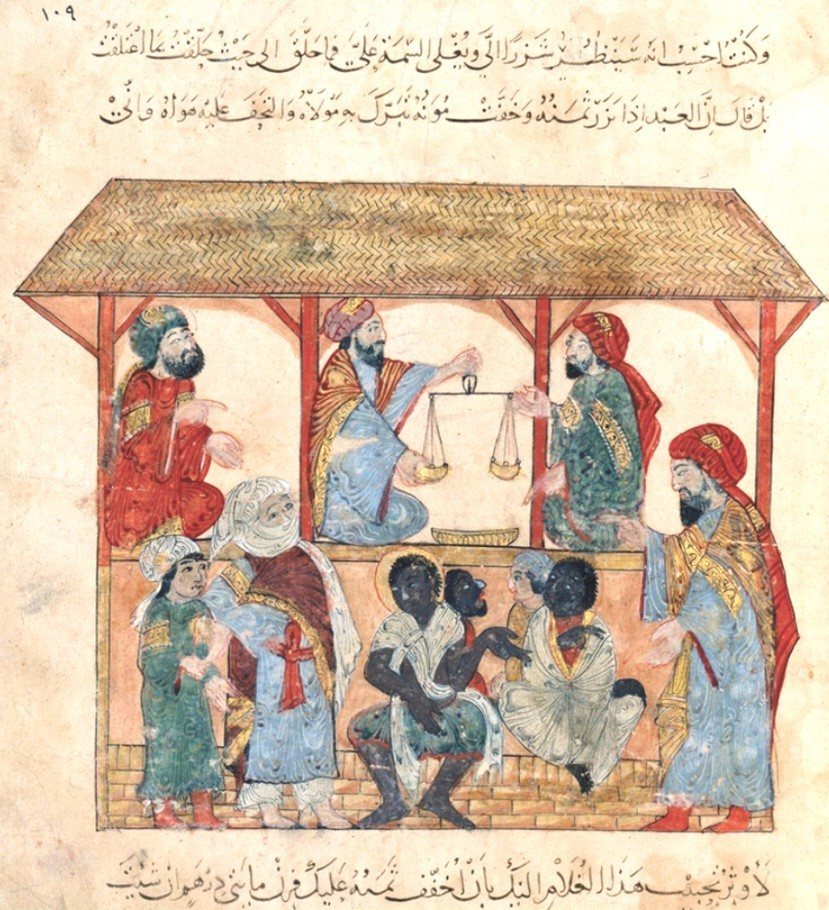

== Other works ==
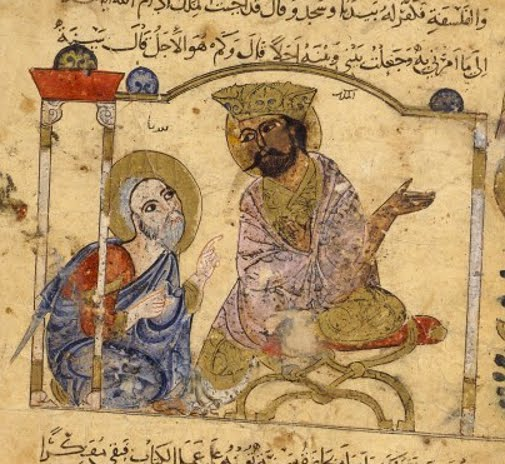
Two men talking from Kalīla wa-Dimna, c. 1222

Yet other examples of work in the style of the Baghdad School include the illustrations in Kalīla wa-Dimna (Fables of Bidpai), (1222); a collection of fables by the Hindu, Bidpai translated into Arabic, and Rasa'il al-Ikhwan al-Safa (The Epistles of the Sincere Brethren) (1287); an example of an illuminated manuscript produced after the Mongol invasion.

== Legacy ==
In the 20th-century, al-Wasiti's illustrations and the Baghdad School served as an inspiration for The Baghdad Modern Art Group. Founded in the 1950s by artists, Jawad Saleem and Shakir Hassan Al Said, members of the group believed that the Mongol invasion of the 13th-century represented a "break in the chain of pictorial Iraqi art" and wanted to reassert a national identity and build a distinctive Iraqi identity which referenced heritage and tradition. As the leader of the group, Saleem promoted the idea of istilham al-turath – "seeking inspiration from tradition".

== See also ==
- Arabic miniature
- Arabic literature
- Culture of Iraq
- Hurufiyya movement
- Islamic art
- Islamic calligraphy
- Islamic Golden Age
- Iraqi art
- List of Iraqi artists

== Sources ==
- Ettinghausen, Richard (1977). La Peinture arabe (in French). Geneva: Skira. pp. 104–124.
  - Translated as Ettinghausen, Richard (1977b). Arab painting. New York : Rizzoli. ISBN 978-0-8478-0081-0.
- Grabar, Oleg (1984). The Illustrations of the Maqamat (PDF). University of Chicago Press. p. 7.
- "Kitāb al-bayṭarah كتاب البيطرة Azdī, Aḥmad ibn ʿAtīq أزدي، أحمد بن عتيق (Or 1523)". Qatar Digital Library. 16 May 2014.
- Contadini, Anna (1 January 2012). A World of Beasts: A Thirteenth-Century Illustrated Arabic Book on Animals (the Kitāb Na't al-Ḥayawān) in the Ibn Bakhtīshū' Tradition. Brill. doi:10.1163/9789004222656_005.
- Hillenbrand, Robert (1 January 2010). "The Schefer Ḥarīrī: A Study in Islamic Frontispiece Design". Arab Painting. pp. 117–134. doi:10.1163/9789004236615_011. ISBN 978-90-04-23661-5.
