= Ibn Mangli =

Military writer

First page of Ibn Manglī's treatise on hunting in the sole surviving manuscript

Muḥammad al-Nāṣirī, called Ibn Manglī, was a Mamlūk military writer who served as an officer of the guard under Sultan al-Ashraf Shaʿbān (r. 1362–1377). He wrote some 15 military works and a book on hunting in Arabic.

== Life ==
Ibn Manglī's date and place of birth are unknown. François Viré deduces, partially on the basis of his arabised name, that he was born in Cairo between 1300 and 1306. Ibn Manglī records that his father fought in the Bilād Uzbik, the land of Özbeg Khan. This has led some authors to conclude that his father was born in Central Asia. The name Ibn Manglī is of Turkic origin, perhaps derived from Möngli, and it has been supposed that his father was a Kipchak. It has also been argued, on the basis of his treatment of Turks in his writings, that it is unlikely he was a Turk.

Ibn Manglī's father was a member of the Baḥriyya corps during one of the three reigns of Sultan al-Nāṣir Nāṣir al-Dīn Muḥammad (1293–1341). The name al-Nāṣirī refers to this affiliation. According to Nikolaj Serikoff, Ibn Manglī's grandfather was also a high-ranking military officer. Given his background, Ibn Manglī belonged to the Mamlūk class of awlād al-nās (sons of rank).

Ibn Manglī served in the Baḥriyya, attaining the rank of muqaddam. Under al-Ashraf Shaʿbān (r. 1362–1377), he served as naqīb al-jaysh (officer of the ḥalqa) in Alexandria. He never married. The date of his death is unknown, although some sources place it in 784 AH (1382–1383 AD).

== Works ==
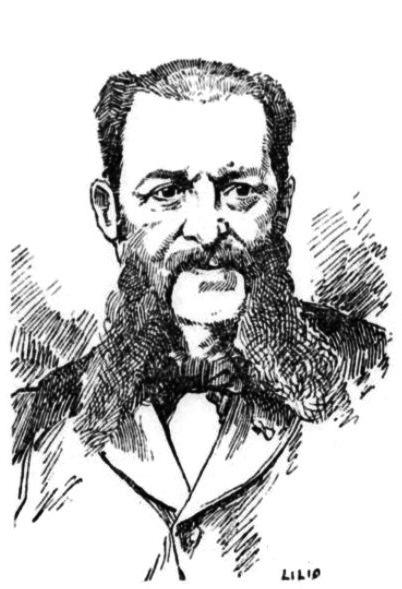
Florian Pharaon, Ibn Manglī's first editor

=== Treatise on hunting ===
Ibn Manglī's only non-military work is a treatise on hunting, Uns al-malā bi-waḥsh al-falā ("the sociable contact of the élite people with the wild beast of the open desert"), completed in 1371–1372 (773 AH). It is known from a single manuscript, now Arabe 2832 in the Bibliothèque nationale de France in Paris, and from an edition with French translation by Florian Pharaon published at Paris in 1880 under the title Traité de vénerie. Pharaon's edition is based on an unidentified but very defective manuscript. In 1984, François Viré put out a new French translation made directly from Arabe 2832.

Uns al-malā bi-waḥsh al-falā began as an abridgement of the Jamhara fī ʿulūm al-bayzara, an encyclopaedia of falconry written by al-Asadī in 1240. To this Ibn Manglī added information from al-Damīrī, al-Jāḥiẓ, Ibn Qutayba, Ibn Waḥshiyya, Ibn Zuhr and al-Rāzī, and information drawn from his own experience as a hunter. His language is "clear, precise and curt". Besides information about hunting practices, Uns al-malā bi-waḥsh al-falā includes information about prey animals, horses, riding and weaponry.

=== Military treatises ===
Ibn Manglī wrote about 15 works on military matters, including tactics and organization. Most of these survive only as citations in the works of others. One that survives complete is the Tadbīrāt al-sulṭānīyya fī siyāsat al-ṣanāʾiʿ al-ḥarbīyya ("royal arrangements: regulations in the art of war"), a treatise on the art of war for commanders written between 1367 and 1377. It survives in seven manuscripts. It stands out for its coverage of furūsiyya (chivalry), horsemanship, weaponry and drill. It is highly critical of the contemporary Mamlūk army, which Ibn Manglī considered had declined in discipline and training. In the debate on the decline of Mamlūk military prowess, Mehdi Berriah considers al-Tadbīrāt strong evidence in favour of an early decline.

Ibn Manglī was "the first Muslim writer to devote as much attention to naval as land warfare", including writing an entire book on the subject, al-Ahkām al-mulūkiyya wa-l-dawābit al-nāmūsiyya fī fann al-qitāl fī al-bahr. In another work, al-Adilla al-rasmiyya fī al-taʿābī al-harbiyya, there is a chapter devoted to naval warfare. This chapter is based on the Naumachica chapter of the Tactica of Emperor Leo the Wise. Both this chapter and the Tadbīrāt include translated excerpts from the Tactica, which Ibn Manglī calls Marātib al-ḥurūb. There is some debate over whether Ibn Manglī knew Greek and translated the text himself or whether he had access to an existing Arabic translation or an Arabic epitome. In the Ahkām, Ibn Manglī says there was one physician per warship, while in the Adilla he says that each ship should have two physicians. All the excerpts from the Tactica have been translated into English.

The Kitāb al-ḥiyal fī l-ḥurūb wa fatḥ al-madāʾin wa ḥifẓ al-durūb, a translated Byzantine military manual, has been attributed to Ibn Manglī. Nonetheless, the manual has been updated with specifically Mamlūk material. It refers to naphtha and the production of incendiary devices in dedicated workshops (dār al-ṣināʿa), one of which was located in Tyre.

== Notes and references ==
=== Editions ===
- Ibn Manglī (1974). ʿAbd al-ʿAāziz Mahmoūd ʿAbd al-Dāim (ed.). Al-Ahkām al-Mulūkiyya wā ʾl-dawābit al-Nāmusiyya fī fan al-kitāl fī al-bahr mʿā dirasah ʿan fan al-kitāl al-bahari fī ʿasr slātin al-Mamālyk (PhD dissertation). Cairo University.
- Ibn Manglī (1984). François Viré (ed.). De la chasse: commerce des grands de ce monde avec bêtes sauvages des déserts sans onde. Paris.
- Ibn Manglī (1988). al-Liwāʾ Rukn Maḥmūd Shayt Khaṭṭāb (ed.). al-Adilla al-rasmiyya fī l-taʿābī al-ḥarbiyya. Bagdad.
- Ibn Manglī (1993). M. Ṣalḥiya (ed.). Kitāb Uns al-Malā bi-Waḥsh al-Falā. Amman.
- Ibn Manglī (1997). Sulaymān al-Ruḥaylī (ed.). Kitāb al-ḥiyal fī l-ḥurūb wa fatḥ al-madāʾin wa ḥifẓ al-durūb. Riyad.

=== Works cited ===
- Berriah, Mehdi (2025). L'art de la guerre chez les Mamelouks (1250–1375): Stratégies et tactiques. Brill.
- Christides, Vassilios (1995). "Ibn al-Manqalī (Manglī) and Leo VI: New Evidence on Arab-Byzantine Ship Construction and Naval Warfare". Byzantinoslavica. 56 (1): 83–96.
- Muhammad, Tarek M. (2003). "Ibn Manglī between the Arab and Byzantine Worlds: New Evidence" (PDF). Journal of Medieval and Islamic History. 3: 25–43.
- Muhammad, Tarek M. (2009). "Ibn Manglī and Naval Warfare: The Question of Greek Fire between the Muslims and Byzantines". International Journal of Maritime History. 21 (1): 55–80. doi:10.1177/084387140902100104.
- Pryor, John H.; Jeffreys, Elizabeth M. (2006). The Age of the Δρομων: The Byzantine Navy, ca 500–1204. Brill.
- Serikoff, Nikolaj (2003) [1992]. "Leo VI Arabus? An Unknown Fragment from the Arabic Translation of Leo VI's Taktika". Acta Orientalia Vilnensia. 4: 112–118.
- Shboul, Ahmad (2006). "Appendix Eight: [a] Al-adilla al-rasmiyya fīʾl-taʿābī al-ḥarbiyya, [b] Al-aḥkām al-mulūkiyya wa ʾl-ḍawābit al-nāmūsiyya, Translation". The Age of the Δρομων: The Byzantine Navy, ca 500–1204. Brill. pp. 645–666.
- Shehada, Housni Alkhateeb (2013). Mamluks and Animals: Veterinary Medicine in Medieval Islam. Brill.
- Viré, François (2004). "Ibn Manglī". In Bearman, P. J.; Bianquis, Th.; Bosworth, C. E.; van Donzel, E. & Heinrichs, W. P. (eds.). The Encyclopaedia of Islam, Second Edition. Volume XII: Supplement. Leiden: E. J. Brill. pp. 392–393. ISBN 978-90-04-13974-9. Originally published in 1982.

=== Further reading ===
- Christides, Vassilios (1984). "Naval Warfare in the Eastern Mediterrenean (6th–14th centuries): An Arab Translation of Leo VI's Naumachica". Graeco-Arabica. 3: 137–148.
- Zoppoth, Gerhard (1957). "Muḥammad ibn Mängli: Ein ägyptischer Offizier und Schriftsteller des 14. Jh. s.". Wiener Zeitschrift für die Kunde des Morgenlandes. 53: 288–299. JSTOR 23865474.
