= Kitāb al-bayṭara =

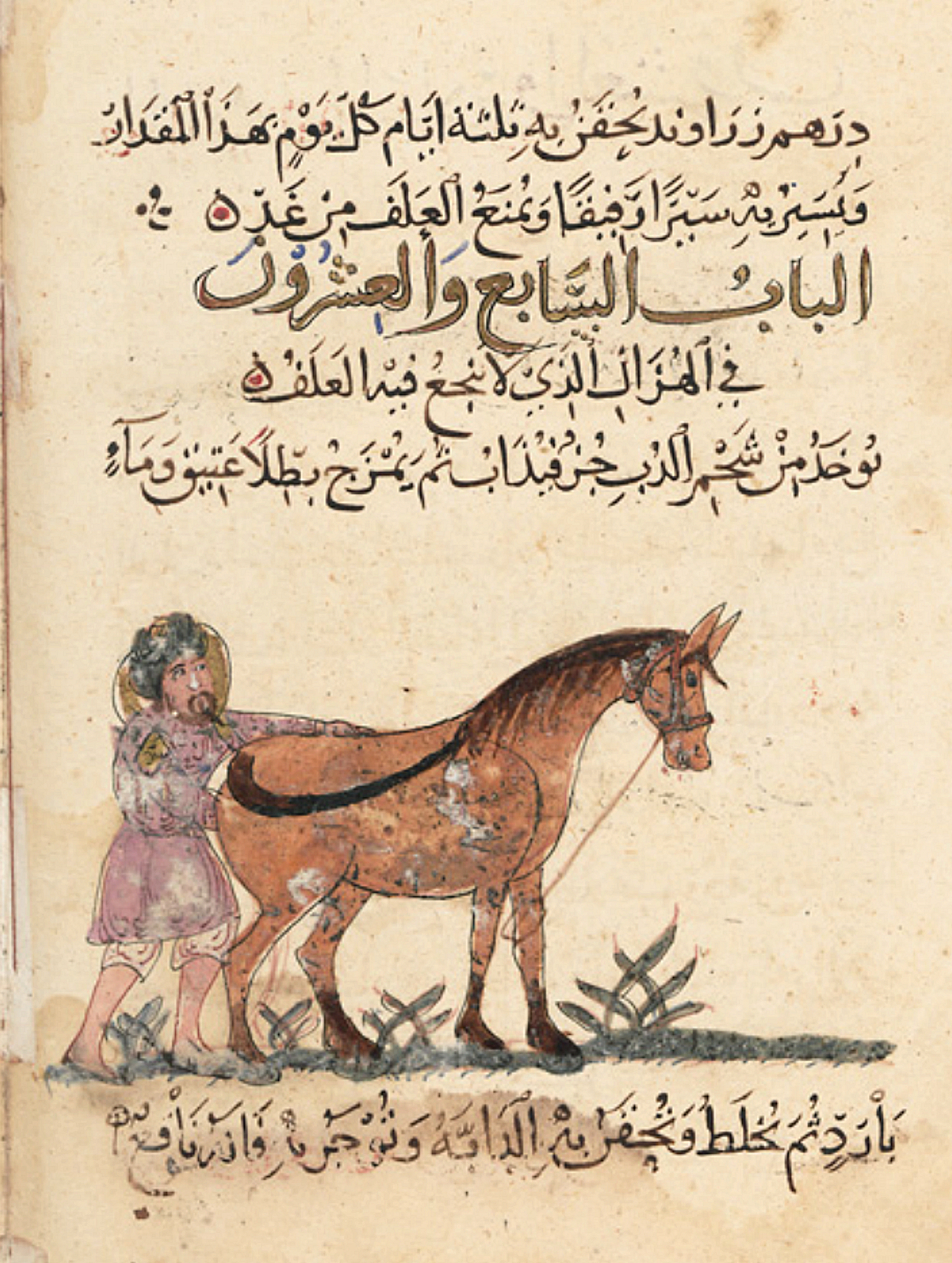
- Grooming a horse, Kitab al-baytara 2010, Topkapi Museum.
- Author: Aḥmad ibn al-Ḥusayn ibn al-Aḥnaf
- Original title: كتاب البيطرة
- Illustrator: ʿAlī ibn Ḥasan ibn Hibatallāh
- Language: Arabic
- Subject: Horse medicine
- Genre: Treatise
- Published: 12th century
- Media type: Manuscript

The Kitāb al-bayṭara (Arabic: كتاب البيطرة, "Book of Farriery" or "Book of Hippiatrics") is a 12th-century Arabic treatise on horse medicine by Aḥmad ibn al-Ḥusayn ibn al-Aḥnaf.

== Sources ==
The Kitāb al-bayṭara is based on a Greek work on the grooming and veterinary treatment of horses entitled Hippiatrica. The style of the two known manuscripts is characteristic of the pictorial tradition in Upper Mesopotamia, northern Iraq, and southeastern Anatolia at that time, with its frameless figures on a blank background.

== Manuscripts ==
Two illustrated manuscripts of the text are known, produced by the same artist, ʿAlī ibn Ḥasan ibn Hibatallāh, dating to 1209 (Cairo, Egyptian National Library and Archives, Khalil Agha F8) and 1210 (Istanbul, Topkapı Library, TSMK, A. 2115) are known.

The 1209 copy manuscript is dated to 1209 through its colophon; the colophon also indicates that it was produced in Baghdad. It is the only pre-Mongol illustrated manuscript whose place of production is securely attributed to Baghdad, which makes it a key work in trying to define a "Baghdad School" of illustrated manuscripts before the Mongol Siege of Baghdad in 1258. The manuscript depicts horse-riders who wear the Turkic sharbūsh headgear.

The 1210 copy does not mention Baghdad, but is considered a copy of the 1209 manuscript, made by the same calligrapher.

The Kitāb al-bayṭara has been used as an artistic reference to try to attribute a famous 1237 CE Maqāmāt al-Ḥarīrī manuscript (Paris, Bibliothèque Nationale de France, Arabe 5847) to Baghdad as well. The attempt is based on a certain level of artistic similarity, but this attribution remains uncertain, and the place of production of the BNF Arabe 5847 remains unsure and it can only said to have been made between Syria and Iraq.

Another illustrated manuscript which is tentatively attributed to pre-Mongol Baghdad is the dispersed 1224 Dioscorides (De Materia Medica 1224). Here again, attribution to Baghdad remains tentative, and a more cautious attribution, such as "Iraq or Northern Jazira, possibly Baghdad" is often preferred.

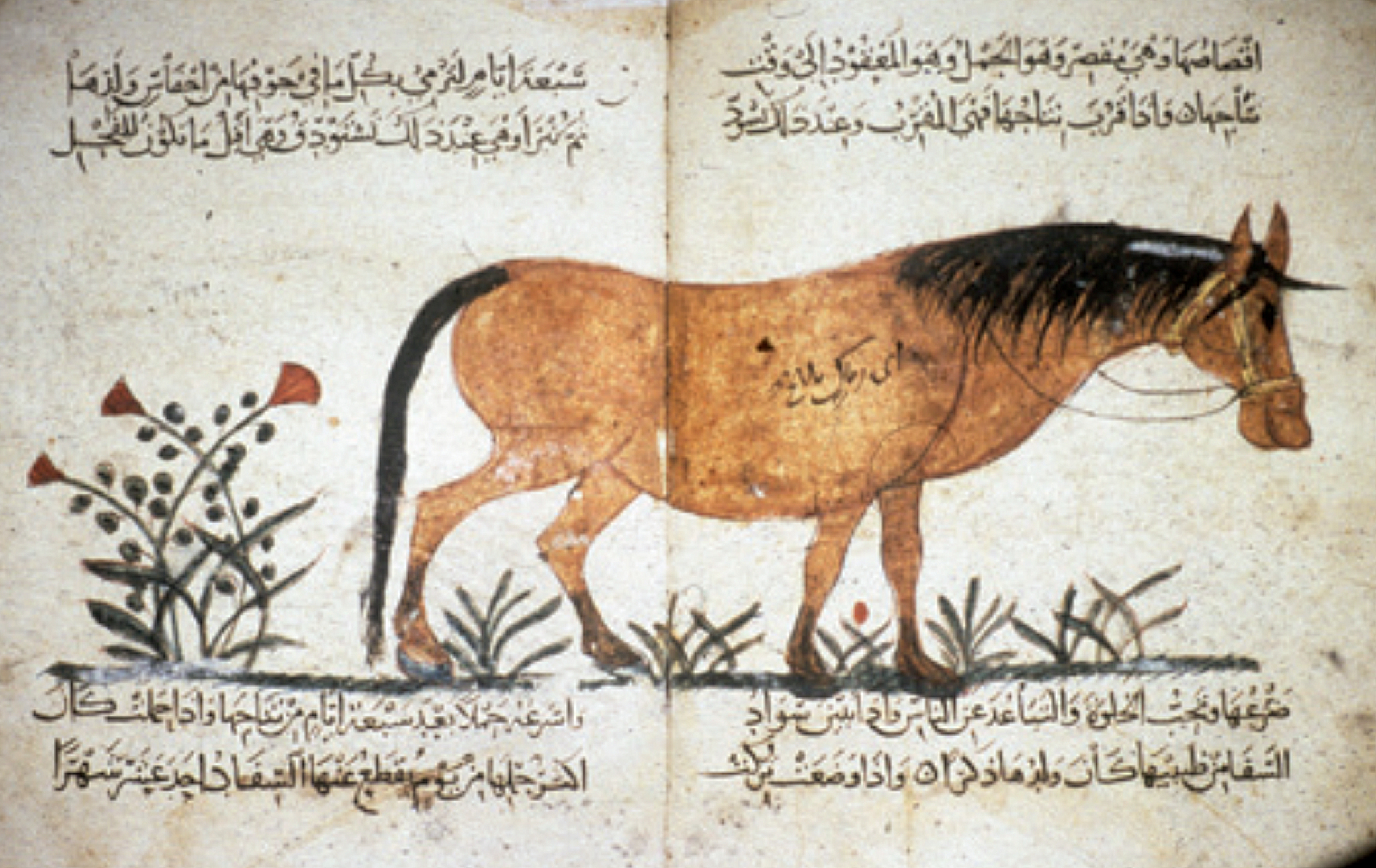
Ibn al-Aḥnaf, Kitāb al-Bayṭara, Baghdad, dated AH 605/1210 CE . A horse. Istanbul, TKS, Ahmet III 2115.

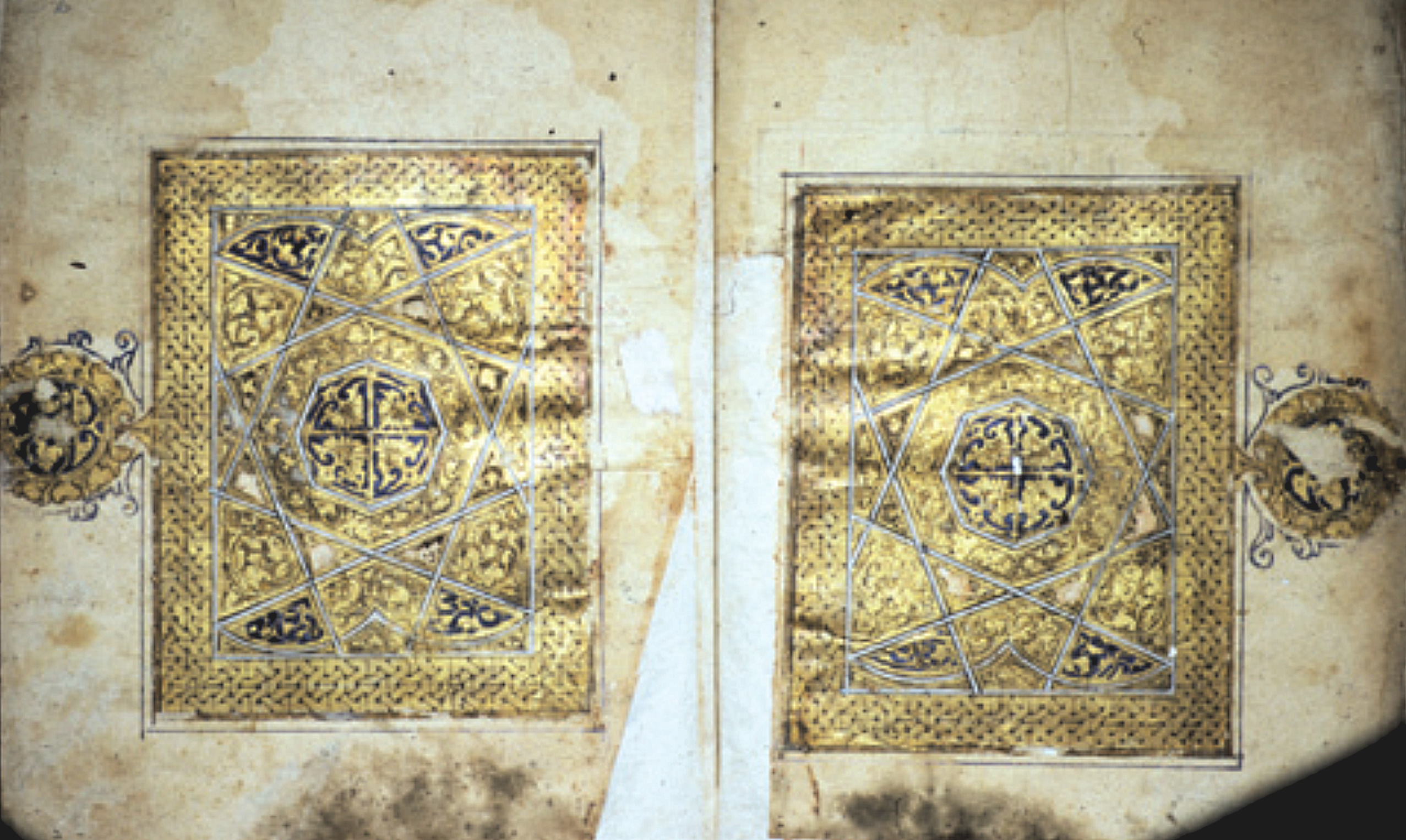
Ibn al-Aḥnaf, Kitāb al-Bayṭara, Baghdad, dated AH 605/1210 CE. Frontispiece. Istanbul, TKS, Ahmet III 2115.

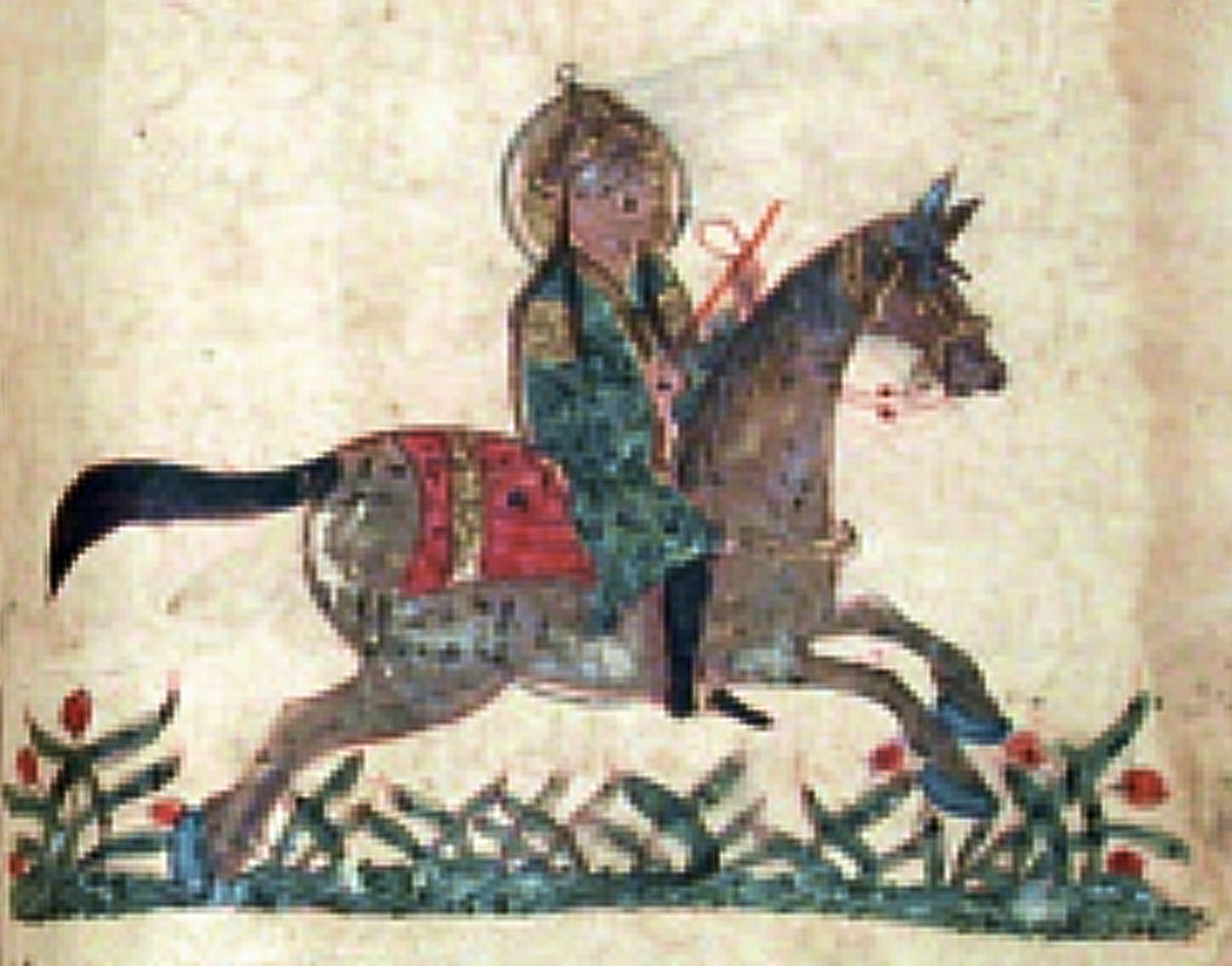
Rider wearing Turkic sharbūsh. 1209 CE, Baghdad. Egyptian National Library and Archives, (Khalil Agha F8).

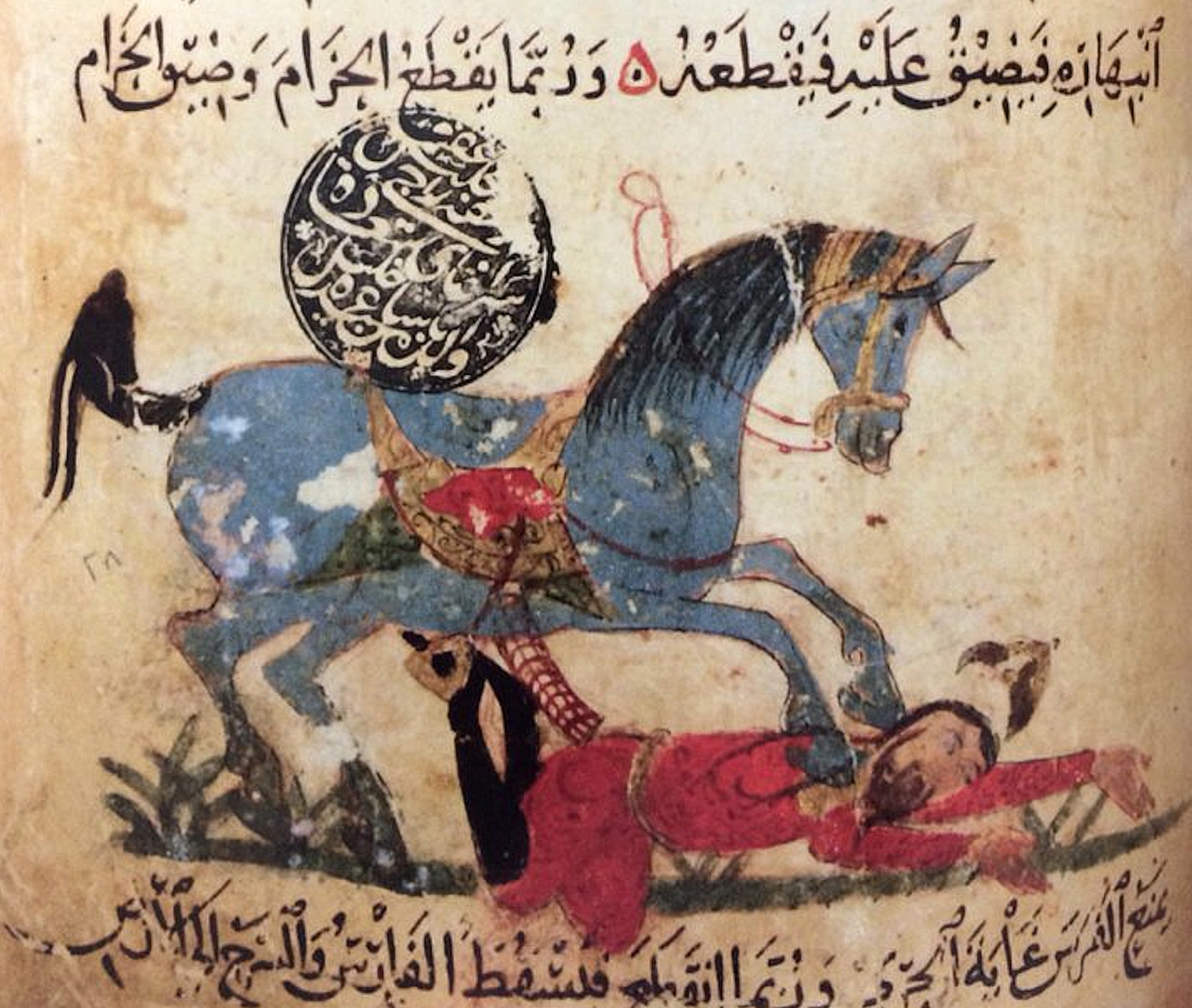
Rider with sharbūsh, thrown from his horse. 1209 CE, Baghdad. Egyptian National Library and Archives, (Khalil Agha F8).

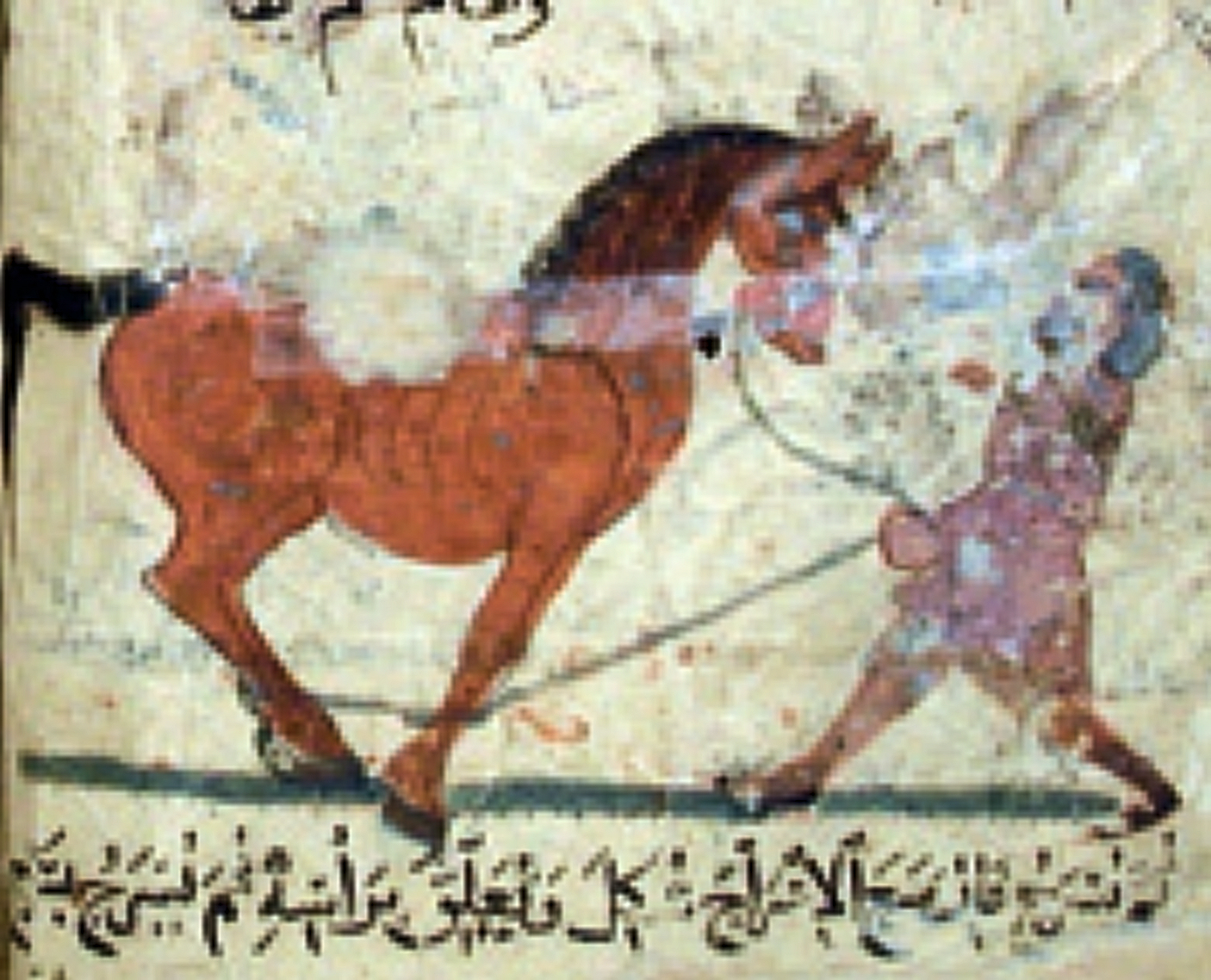
Ibn al-Aḥnaf, Kitāb al-Bayṭara, Baghdad, dated AH 605/ 1209 CE. Horse training.

== Sources ==
- Grabar, Oleg (1984). The Illustrations of the Maqamat (PDF). University of Chicago Press. p. 7.
- "Kitāb al-bayṭarah كتاب البيطرة Azdī, Aḥmad ibn ʿAtīq أزدي، أحمد بن عتيق (Or 1523)". Qatar Digital Library. Qatar Digital Library. 16 May 2014.
- Contadini, Anna (1 January 2012). A World of Beasts: A Thirteenth-Century Illustrated Arabic Book on Animals (the Kitāb Na‘t al-Ḥayawān) in the Ibn Bakhtīshū‘ Tradition. Brill. doi:10.1163/9789004222656_005.
