= Isa ibn Ali al-Asadi =

Muslim writer (died 1262)

First page in the Escorial manuscript of al-Jamhara fī ʿulūm al-bayzara

Abu ʾl-Rūḥ ʿĪsā ibn ʿAlī ibn Ḥassān al-Asadī (died 1262) was a Muslim writer. Ibn Manglī describes him as an expert on hunting who lived in the 6th century since the Hijra (1100s) under the Ayyubid dynasty. Between 1237 and 1242, after 23 years of traveling throughout the Islamic world, he wrote an encyclopaedia on falconry, al-Jamhara fī ʿulūm al-bayzara. It contains 578 chapters on hunting birds and other animals (hunting dogs, cheetahs) used in falconry; the history of falconry, including celebrated anecdotes; the health, training and veterinary care of birds; the legal and religious position of falconry in the Islamic world; and falconers' sayings and poems. It was at the time the most comprehensive work on hunting in Arabic.

There are five surviving manuscripts of the Jamhara known. Manuscript 3814 in the Hagia Sophia dates to 1273. There is no printed edition of the text, although three chapters on the use of the raven (Corvus ruficollis) have been translated into French by François Viré from a manuscript of 1589, now Árabe 903 in the Escorial, which contains 302 folios. Select chapters of the Jamhara have also been translated into English directly from manuscript. The Jamhara was used as a base text by Ibn Manglī for his own hunting treatise, Uns al-malā bi-waḥsh al-falā, completed in 1371–1372. Ibn Manglī criticizes al-Asadī for his scepticism. After describing how vultures soak themselves in lakes, cover themselves in sand and then shake the sand off themselves into the eyes of wild asses in order to trap them, Ibn Manglī notes that al-Asadī rejects such stories.

== Bibliography ==
- Phillott, D. C.; Azoo, R. F. (1907). "Things which the Owners of Hawks Should Avoid, Being an Extract from the Kitāb^{u} ʾl-Jamharah fī ʿilm^{i} ʾl-Bazyarah". Journal and Proceedings of the Asiatic Society of Bengal. N.S. 3 (6): 401–403.
- Phillott, D. C.; Azoo, R. F. (1907). "Some Birds and other Animals that Have Been Metamorphosed, Being an Extract from the Kitāb^{u} ʾl-Jamharah fī ʿilm^{i} ʾl-Bazyarah, an Arabic Manuscript, no. 865, in the Library of the Asiatic Society of Bengal". Journal and Proceedings of the Asiatic Society of Bengal. N.S. 3 (9): 139–143.
- Phillott, D. C.; Azoo, R. F. (1907). "The Birds' Complaint before Solomon: Being an Extract with a Translation from the Kitāb^{u} ʾl-Jamharah fī ʿilm^{i} ʾl-Bazyarah". Journal and Proceedings of the Asiatic Society of Bengal. N.S. 3 (9): 173–178.
- Phillott, D. C.; Azoo, R. F. (1907). "On Hunting Dogs, Being an Extract from the Kitāb^{u} ʾl-Jamharah fī ʿilm^{i} ʾl-Bazyarah". Journal and Proceedings of the Asiatic Society of Bengal. N.S. 3 (9): 599–600.
- Shehada, Housni Alkhateeb (2013). Mamluks and Animals: Veterinary Medicine in Medieval Islam. Brill.
- Viré, François (2004). "Ibn Manglī". In Bearman, P. J.; Bianquis, Th.; Bosworth, C. E.; van Donzel, E. & Heinrichs, W. P. (eds.). The Encyclopaedia of Islam, Second Edition. Volume XII: Supplement. Leiden: E. J. Brill. pp. 392–393. ISBN 978-90-04-13974-9. Originally published in 1982.
- Viré, François; Van Den Abeele, Baudouin (2005). "L'utilisation du Grand Corbeau, d'après le traité de chasse d'al-Asadī". Arabica. 52 (4): 544–564. JSTOR 4057606.
