= Arabic riddles =

Traditional form of word-play in Arabic

Riddles are historically a significant genre of Arabic literature. The Qur’an does not contain riddles as such, though it does contain conundrums. But riddles are attested in early Arabic literary culture, 'scattered in old stories attributed to the pre-Islamic bedouins, in the ḥadīth and elsewhere; and collected in chapters'. Since the nineteenth century, extensive scholarly collections have also been made of riddles in oral circulation.

Although in 1996 the Syrian proverbs scholar Khayr al-Dīn Shamsī Bāshā published a survey of Arabic riddling, analysis of this literary form has been neglected by modern scholars, including its emergence in Arabic writing; there is also a lack of editions of important collections. A major study of grammatical and semantic riddles was, however, published in 2012, and since 2017 both legal riddles and verse riddles have enjoyed growing attention.

== Terminology and genres ==
Riddles are known in Arabic principally as lughz (Arabic: لُغز) (pl. alghāz ألغاز), but other terms include uḥjiyya (pl. aḥājī), and ta'miya.

Lughz is a capacious term. As al-Nuwayrī (1272–1332) puts it in the chapter on alghāz and aḥājī in his Nihāyat al-Arab fī funūn al-adab:

Lughz is thought to derive from the phrase alghaza ’l-yarbū‘u wa-laghaza, which described the action of a field rat when it burrows its way first straight ahead but then veers off to the left or right in order to more successfully elude its enemies (li-yuwāriya bi-dhālika) so that it becomes, as it were, almost invisible (wa-yu‘ammiya ‘alā ṭālibihī). But in fact our language also has many other names of lughz such as mu’āyāh, ’awīṣ, ramz, muḥāgāh, abyāt al-ma’ānī, malāḥin, marmūs, ta’wīl, kināyah, ta‘rīd, ishārah, tawgīh, mu‘ammā, mumaththal. Although each of these terms is used more or less interchangeably for lughz, the very fact that there are so many of them is indicative of the varied explanations which the concept of lughz can apparently support.

This array of terms goes beyond those covered by riddle in English, into metaphor, ambiguity, and punning, indicating the fuzzy boundaries of the concept of the riddle in literary Arabic culture.

=== Overlap with other genres ===
Since early Arabic poetry often features rich, metaphorical description, and ekphrasis, there is a natural overlap in style and approach between poetry generally and riddles specifically; literary riddles are therefore often a subset of the descriptive poetic form known as waṣf. Indeed, some of the riddles included by Abū al-Maʿālī Saʿd ibn ʿAlī al-Ḥaẓīrī in his seminal, twelfth-century CE collection of riddles are verses selected from longer poems, in whose original context they are indeed metaphorical descriptions rather than riddles; likewise Abū Naṣr Aḥmad b. Ḥātim al-Bāhilī's Kitāb Abyāt al-maʿānī, while focusing on verses rendered enigmatic by the removal of their context, also included purposeful riddles.

To illustrate how some epigrams (maqāṭīʿ) are riddles Adam Talib contrasts the following poems. The first, from an anonymous seventeenth-century anthology, runs:

في دجاجة مشوية [من السريع]
دَجاجَةٌ صَفْراءُ مِن شَيِّها\\حَمْراءُ كالوَسْدِ مِن الوَهْجِ
كأَنًّها والجَمْرُ مِن تَحْتتِها\\أُتْرُجَّةٌ مِن فوقِ ناسَنْجِ

Translation:

On a roasted chicken (in sarīʿ metre):
A chicken that's golden from roasting
and red like a rose from the flame.
It appears, as the coals beneath it glow,
like a citron atop a bitter orange.

The second is from the fifteenth-century Rawḍ al-ādāb by Shihāb ad-Dīn al-Ḥijāzī al-Khazrajī:

شهاب الدين بن الخيمي في الملعقة: [من المتقارب]
ومَهْدودةٍ كَيَدِ المُجْتَدي\\بِكَفٍّ عَلَى ساعدٍ مُسْعَدِ
تَرَى بَعْضَها في فَمِي كالِلسانِ\\وحَمْلَتُها في يَدِي كاليَدِ

Translation:

Shihāb ad-Dīn Ibn al-Khiyamī on a spoon (in mutaqārib metre):
Feeble like the hand of a beggar,
his palm laid against the arm of a fortunate man.
You see part of it in my mouth like a tongue,
while I hold the handle in my hand like a hand.

In the first case, the subject of the epigram is clearly stated within the epigram itself, such that the epigram cannot be considered a riddle. In the second, however, the resolution 'depends on the reader deducing the point after the poem has been read'.

=== Muʿammā ===
The term muʿammā (literally 'blinded' or 'obscured') is sometimes used as a synonym for lughz (or to denote cryptography or codes more generally), but it can be used specifically to denote a riddle which is solved 'by combining the constituent letters of the word or name to be found'.

The muʿammā is in verse, does not include an interrogatory element, and involves clues as to the letters or sounds of the word. One example of the form is a riddle on the name Aḥmad:

awwaluhu thālithu tuffāḥat^{in}
wa-rābi‘u ’l-tuffāḥi thānīhī
Wa-awwalu ’l-miski lahū thālith^{un}
wa-ākhiru ’l-wardi li-bāḳihī

Translation:

Its first is the third of [the word] tuffāḥa (apple) = A;
and the fourth of [the word] tuffāḥ (apples) is its second = Ḥ;
and the first of [the word] misk (musk) is its third = M;
and the last of the word ward (roses) is the remainder of it = D

Another example, cited by Ibn Dāwūd al-Iṣfahānī, has the answer 'S^{a}ʿīd'. Here, and in the transliteration that follows, short vowels are transliterated in superscript, as they are not included in the Arabic spelling:

فَاخر الترس له أول\\وثالث الدرع له آخر
وخامس الساعد ثانٍ له\\ورابع السيف له دابر

Translation:

The end of "t^{u}rs" [shield] is for him the beginning / The third of "al-d^{i}r‘" [armor] is for him the end
The fifth of "al-sā‘^{i}d" [arm] is for him the second / The fourth of "al-s^{a}yf" [sword] is for him what follows

The first known exponent of the muʿammā form seems to have been the major classical poet Abu Nuwas, though other poets are also credited with inventing the form: Al-Khalil ibn Ahmad al-Farahidi (noted for his cryptography) and Ali ibn Abi Talib.

It appears that the muʿammā form became popular from perhaps the thirteenth century.

Muʿammā riddles also include puzzles using the numerical values of letters.

==== Chronograms ====
A subset of the mu‘ammā is the chronogram (تأريخ, taʾrīkh), a puzzle in which the reader must add up the numerical values of the letters of a hemistich to arrive as a figure; this figure is the year of the event described in the poem. The form seems to have begun in Arabic in the thirteenth century and gained popularity from the fifteenth; as with examples of the same form in Latin, it was borrowed from Hebrew and Aramaic texts using the same device, possibly via Persian. The following poem is by the pre-eminent composer in the form, Māmayah al-Rūmī (d. 1577):

وله تأريخ: مطر هلّ بعد يأس [من الرجز]
قَدْ جاءَنا صَوْمٌ جليلٌ قدرُهُ\\والحقُّ فينا قَدْ أرانا قُدْرَتَهْ
وعَمَّنا الانسانَ في تأريخِهِ\\وأَنْزلَ اللهُ عَلَيْنا رَحْمَتَهْ

Translation:

A chronogram-poem on rainfall after despair set in:
We were visited by a period of abstention of great duration
The Truth showed us his power.
And then it encompassed every human on that day (taʾrīkh)
that God rained down on us his mercy.

The letters of the last hemistich have the following values:

ه	ت	م	ح	ر	ا	ن	ي	ل	ع	ه	ل	ل	ا	ل	ز	ن	أ	و
5	400	40	8	200	1	50	10	30	70	5	30	30	1	30	7	50	1	6

These add up to 974 AH (1566 CE), the year of the drought which al-Rūmī was describing.

=== Abyāt al-maʿānī ===
Abyāt al-maʿānī ('verses of [ambiguous or obscure] meanings') is a technical term related to the genre of alghāz. Ordinarily, abyāt al-maʿānī are verses quoted from longer compositions in anthologies called kutub abyāt al-maʿānī ('books of abyāt al-maʿānī'), which in their original context were not especially obscure, but which are hard to interpret when taken out of context. However, kutub abyāt al-maʿānī could also include purposefully enigmatic verses. In a chapter on alghāz, Al-Suyuti defines the genre as follows:

There are kinds of puzzles that the Arabs aimed for and other puzzles that the scholars of language aim for, and also lines in which the Arabs did not aim for puzzlement, but they uttered them and they happened to be puzzling; these are of two kinds: Sometimes puzzlement occurs in them on account of their meaning, and most of abyāt al-maʿānī are of this type. Ibn Qutaybah compiled a good volume on this, and others compiled similar works. They called this kind [of poetry] abyāt al-maʿānī because it requires someone to ask about their meaning and they are not comprehended on first consideration. Some other times, puzzlement occurs because of utterance, construction or inflection (iʿrāb).

Kutub abyāt al-maʿānī include the Kitāb al-Maʿānī al-kabīr by Ibn Qutayba (d. 276/889), Kitāb Maʿānī al-shiʿr by al-Ushnāndānī (d. 288/901), and a Kitāb Abyāt al-maʿānī by al-Bāhilī known now only through quotations by later scholars.

=== Legal riddles (alghāz fiqhīya) ===
There is a significant tradition of literary riddles on legal matters in Arabic. According to Matthew Keegan, 'the legal riddle operates as a fatwā in reverse. It presents an apparently counterintuitive legal ruling or legal outcome, one that might even be shocking. The solution is derived by reverse-engineering the situation in which such a fatwā or legal outcome would be correct'. He gives as an example the following riddle by Ibn Farḥūn (d. 1397):

If you said: A man who is fit to be a prayer leader but who is not fit to be a congregant?
Then I would say: He is the blind man who became deaf after learning what was necessary for him to lead prayer. It is not permissible for him to be led by a prayer leader because he would not be aware of the imām's actions unless someone alerted him to them.

Legal riddles appear to have become a major literary genre in the fourteenth century. Elias G. Saba has attributed this development to the spread of intellectual literary salons (majālis) in the Mamlūk period, which demanded the oral performance of arcane knowledge, and in turn influenced written texts. By the fourteenth century, scholars were starting to gather existing legal riddles into chapters of jurisprudential works, among them Tāj al-Dīn al-Subkī (d. 1370) in an eclectic chapter of his Kitāb al-Ashbāh wa-l-Naẓāʾir.

The earliest anthologies specifically of legal riddles seem to have been composed in the fourteenth century, and the earliest known today are:

- al-Isnawī (d. 1370), Shāfiʿī school: Ṭirāz al-Maḥāfil fī Alghāz al-Masāʾil.
- Ibn Abī al-ʿIzz (d. 1390), Ḥanafī school: al-Tahdhīb li-Dhihn al-Labīb.
- Ibn Farḥūn (d. 1397), Mālikī school: Durrat al-ghawwāṣ fī muḥāḍarat al-khawāṣṣ ('the pearl-diver's prize on the discourse of elites').

These show three of the four main schools of legal thought producing riddle-collections; the Ḥanbalī school, however, seems not to have participated much in legal riddling. The overlap between legal riddles and literature on distinctions seems to have been at its greatest in Mamlūk Cairo. A particularly influential example of a collection of legal riddles was ʿAbd al-Barr Ibn al-Shiḥna (d. 1515), who wrote al-Dhakhāʾir al-ashrafiyya fī alghāz al-ḥanafiyya.

The origins of the form stretch back earlier, however. According to some ḥadīth, the use of riddles to encourage thought about religious constraints in Islam goes back to the Prophet himself. The genre of legal riddling seems to have arisen partly from an interest in other intellectually challenging jurisprudential matters: ḥiyal (strategems for avoiding breaking the letter of the law) and furūq (subtle distinctions). It seems also to have drawn inspiration from literary texts: the Futyā Faqīh al-ʿArab ('The Fatwās of the Jurist of the Arabs') by Ibn Fāris (d. 1004) includes 'a series of fatwās that initially appear to be absurd and incorrect' but which can be rendered logical by invoking non-obvious meanings of the words used in the fatwās. This form was deployed soon after in the highly influential Maqāmāt of al-Ḥarīrī of Basra (d. 1122).

=== Mutayyar (bird-riddles) ===
The eleventh-century Andalusi poet Ibn Zaydūn is associated with another riddle form, of which at least five Arabic examples survive in his work, along with a pair of Andalusi Hebrew-language poems in the same form exchanged between Abū ʿUmar ibn Māthiqa and Yehuda HaLevi (though only Yehuda's side of the exchange survives in full). In this form of riddle, the poet composes a short poem. Each letter of the alphabet is then assigned the name of a species of bird, and the poem is encoded as a list of bird-names. The poet then composes a new poem, mentioning all these bird-names in the correct order, and sends that to its recipient, frequently claiming that it is being sent by pigeon post. The name mutayyar (Arabic: مُطَيَّر) given to such riddles, usually used of cloth, means 'ornamented with designs representing birds'.

== History of literary riddles ==
=== Pre-Abbasid (pre-750 CE) ===
==== In ḥadīth ====
One riddle attributed to the Prophet is found in the Bāb al-ḥayā of the Kitāb al-ʿIlm of the Ṣaḥīḥ al-Buckārī by al-Bukhārī (d. 870) and the Muwaṭṭaʾ by Mālik ibn Anas (d. 796). Muḥammad says: إِنَّ مِنَ الشَّجَرِ شَجَرَةً لاَ يَسْقُطُ وَرَقُهَا، وَإِنَّهَا مَثَلُ الْمُسْلِمِ، حَدِّثُونِي مَا هِيَ ("there is a kind of tree that does not lose its leaves and is like a Muslim. Tell me what it is"). The hadith tradition records the answer: the date palm (nakhla). But it does not explain in what way the date palm is like a Muslim, which led to extensive debate among medieval Muslim scholars. The hadith is important, however, as it legitimated the use of riddles in theological and legal education in Islam.

According to al-Subkī, the earliest known example of post-prophetic riddles concerns the Prophet's companion Ibn ʿAbbās (d. c. 687), who is asked a series of exegetical conundrums such as “Tell me of a man who enters Paradise but God forbade Muḥammad to act as he acted”. (Ibn ʿAbbās answers that this is Jonah, since the Koran tells Muḥammad "be not like the Companion of the fish, when he cried while he was in distress" in sura 68:48.)

==== In poetry ====
There is little evidence for Arabic riddling in the pre-Islamic period. A riddle contest, supposedly between the sixth-century CE Imruʾ al-Qays and ʿAbīd ibn al-Abraṣ, exists, but is not thought actually to have been composed by these poets. One of the earliest reliably attested composers of riddles was Dhu al-Rummah (c. 696–735), whose verse riddles 'undoubtedly contributed' to the 'rooting and spread' of Arabic literary riddles, though his exact contribution to this process is 'yet to be assessed'. His Uḥjiyyat al-ʿArab ('the riddle-poem of the Arabs') is particularly striking, comprising a nasīb (stanzas 1–14), travel faḥr (15-26) and then twenty-six enigmatic statements (28-72). Odes 27, 64, 82 and 83 also contain riddles. 64 writes of the earth as though it were a camel, while 82 runs:

وَجَارِيَةٍ لَيْسَت مِنَ ٱلْإنْسِ تَسْتَحِي\\وَلَاٱلْجِنِّ قَدْ لَاعَبْتُهَا وَمَعِى دُهْنِي
فَأَدْخَلْتُ فِيهَا قَيْدَ شِبْرٍ مُوَفَّرٍ\\فَصَاحَتْ وَلَا وَٱﷲِ مَا وُجِدَتْ تَزْنِي
فَلَمَّا دَنَتْ اهْرَاَقَةُ ٱلْمَآء أَنْصَتَتْ\\لِأَعْزِلَةٍ عَنْهَا وَفِى ٱلنَّفْسِ أَنْ أُثْنِي

Translation:

And many a shy maid neither human nor genie have I dallied with while I had my oil with me.
So I inserted into her an ample span-length and she cried out. And no, by God! she was not found to be committing fornication.
And when the time of emission (pouring forth of water) came near she became quiet in order that I might have the emission outside though desiring that I do it again.

The solution to this riddle is that the narrator is drawing water from a well. The 'shy maid' is a bucket. The bucket has a ring on it, into which the narrator inserts a pin which is attached to the rope which he uses the draw up the water. As the bucket is drawn up, it makes noise, but once at the top it is still and therefore quiet. Once the bucket is still, the narrator can pour out the water, and the bucket desires to be filled again.

=== Abbasid (750-1258 CE) ===
==== By poets ====
According to Pieter Smoor, discussing a range of ninth- to eleventh-century poets,

There is a slow but discernable development which can be traced in the Arabic riddle poem through the course of time. The earlier poets, like Ibn al-Rūmi, al-Sarī al-Raffā’ and Mutanabbī composed riddle poems of the 'narrow' kind, i.e. without the use of helpful homonyms ... Abu ’l-‘Alā’'s practise, however, tended toward the reverse: in his work 'narrow' riddles have become comparatively rare ... while homonymous riddles are quite common.

Riddles are discussed by literary and grammatical commentators — allegedly beginning with the eighth-century grammarian al-Khalīl ibn Ahmad (d. 786), (who was later even to be credited with the invention of the (rhymed) riddle). What may have been the first Arabic book of riddles, Kitāb al-Armāz fī l-alġāz, was composed by Abū al-ʿAbbās al-Ḍabbī (fl. c. 1000), but it is now lost save for a small number of quotations. Prominent discussions include the tenth-century Ibrāhīm ibn Wahb al-Kātib in his Kitāb naqd al-nathr, and al-Mathal al-sāʾir (chapter 21, fī al-aḥājī) by Ḍiyāʾ al-Dīn Abu ’l-Fatḥ Naṣr Allāh Ibn al-Athīr (d. 1239). Such texts are also important repositories of riddles.

Collections of riddles appear, alongside other poetry, in Abbasid anthologies. They include chapter 89 of al-Zahra ('فكر ما جاء في الشعر من معنى مستور لا يفهمه سامعه إلاَّ بتفسير') by Ibn Dā’ūd al-Iṣbahāni (868-909 CE); part of book 25 of al-ʿIqd al-Farīd (specifically the section entitled Bāb al-lughz) by Ibn ‘Abd Rabbih (860–940); Ḥilyat al-muḥāḍara by al-Ḥātimī (d. 998); and the chapter entitled فصل في تعمية الأشعار in Abū Hilāl al-ʿAskarī's Dīwān al-maʿānī (d. after 1009).

Among the diverse subjects covered by riddles in this period, the pen was particularly popular: the Dhakhīrah of Ibn Bassām (1058-1147), for example, presents examples by Ibn Khafājah, Ibn al-Mu‘tazz, Abu Tammām and Ibn al-Rūmī and al-Ma‘arrī. Musical instruments are another popular topic, along with lamps and candles.

Among the extensive body of ekphrastic poems by Ibn al-Rūmī (d. 896), Pieter Smoor identified only one as a riddle:

Wa-ḥayyatin fī raʾsihā durratun
tasbaḥu fī baḥrin qaṣīri ʾl-madā.
In ba‘udat kāna ʾl-‘amā ḥāḍiran
wa-in danat bāna ṭariqu ʾl-hudā

Translation:

The pearl-headed snake swims
on a small, self-contained sea.
If she recedes, blindness takes her place;
but in her presence, the right path can be distinctly seen.

The solution to this riddle is the burning wick of an oil lamp. The diwān of Ibn al-Mu‘tazz (861-908) contains riddles on the penis, water-wheel, reed-pipe, palm-trees, and two on ships. The dīwān of Al-Sarī al-Raffā’ (d. 973) contains several riddles on mundane objects, including a fishing net, candle, fan, fleas, a drum, and a fire-pot. al-Maʾmūnī (d. 993) is noted for a large corpus of epigrammatic descriptions which shade into the genre of the riddle. Carl Brockelmann noted Abū Abdallāh al-Ḥusayn ibn Aḥmad al-Mughallis, associated with the court of Baha al-Dawla (r. 988–1012), as a key composer of riddles. Abū al-ʿAlā’ al-Marʿarrī (973-1057) is also noted as an exponent of riddles; his lost work Gāmiʿ al-awzān is said by Ibn al-‘Adīm to have contained 9,000 poetic lines of riddles, some of which are preserved by later scholars, principally Yūsuf al-Badī‘ī. Al-Marʿarrī's riddles are characterised by wordplay and religious themes. Ibn al-Tilmīdh (1074–1165) composed some verse riddles. Usāma ibn Munqidh (1095–1188) developed the riddle-form as a vehicle metaphorically to convey personal feelings. Al-Shākir al-Baṣrī (fl. second half of the eleventh century) composed Kitāb al-Marmūs, containing riddles by himself and at least ten others, known now from quotations by al-Ḥaẓīrī; 74 verse and ten prose riddles by al-Shākir al-Baṣrī survive in this way. The dīwān of Ibn al-Farid (1181-1234) contains fifty-four riddles, of the mu'amma type.

A vast collection of epigrammatic riddles on slave-girls, Alf jāriyah wa-jāriyah, was composed by Ibn al-Sharīf Dartarkhwān al-‘Ādhilī (d. 1257). Zaynaddīn Ibn al-ʿAjamī (1195–1276) composed the first surviving Arabic riddle-collection by a single author.

==== In narrative contexts ====
Riddles also came to be integrated into the episodic anthologies known as maqamat ('assemblies'). An early example was the Maqamat by Badi' az-Zaman al-Hamadhani (969–1007 CE), for example in assemblies 3, 29, 31, 35. This example of one of al-Hamadhānī's riddles comes from elsewhere in his diwān, and was composed for Sahib ibn Abbad:

Akhawāni min ummin wa-ab Lā yafturāni ‘ani l-shaghab

Mā minhumā illā ḍanin Yashkū mu‘ānāta l-da’ab

Wa-kilāhumā ḥaniqu l-fu’ā Di ‘alā akhīhi bi-lā sabab

Yughrīhimā bi-l-sharri sib Ṭu l-rīḥi wa-bnu abī l-khashab

Mā minhumā illā bihī Sharṭu l-yubūsati wa-l-ḥarab

Fa-lanā bi-ṣulḥihimā radan Wa-lanā bi-ḥarbihimā nashab

Yā ayyuhā l-maliku l-ladhī Fī kulli khaṭbin yuntadab

Akhrijhu ikhrāja l-dhakiy Yi fa-qad waṣaftu kamā wajab

Translation:

[There are] two brothers from [the same] mother and father
Who will not give up quarreling

Both of them are worn out
Complaining about the pains of perseverance

Each of the two has a heart enraged
Against his brother for no reason

The grandson of the wind
And the son of the father of wood provoke evil from them

Only by it do they satisfy
The condition of separation and anger

Their reconciliation brings about destruction for us
While their war yields property for us

O king who
Is always promptly obeyed

Figure it out the way a sharp-witted person does
For I gave an adequate description.

The brothers are millstones, driven by a waterwheel made of wood.

Al-Hamadhani's Maqamat were an inspiration for the Maqāmāt of Al-Hariri of Basra (1054–1122 CE), which contain several different kinds of enigmas (assemblies 3, 8, 15, 24, 29, 32, 35, 36, 42 and 44) and establish him as one of the pre-eminent riddle-writers of the medieval Arab world. One of his riddles runs as follows:

Then he said 'now here is another for you, O lords of intellect, fraught with obscurity:

One split in his head it is, through whom ‘the writ’ is known, as honoured recording angels take their pride in him;
When given to drink he craves for more, as though athirst, and settles to rest when thirstiness takes hold of him;
And scatters tears about him when ye bid him run, but tears that sparkle with the brightness of a smile.

After we could not guess who this might be, he told us he was riddling upon a reed-pen.

Meanwhile, an example of legal riddling in the collection is this moment when the protagonist, Abū Zayd al-Sarūjī, is asked "is it permitted to circumambulate (al-taṭawwuf) in the spring (al-rabīʿ)" — that is, the question seems to ask whether the important custom of walking around the Kaʿba is permitted in spring. Unexpectedly, Abū Zayd replies 'that is reprehensible due to the occurrence of a repugnant thing' — and the text explains that he says this because the word al-taṭawwuf can also mean 'relieve one's bowels' and al-rabīʿ can also mean 'a source of water'.

The only medieval manuscript of the One Thousand and One Nights, the Galland Manuscript, contains no riddles. Night 49 does, however, contain two verses portrayed as descriptions written on objects, which are similar in form to verse riddles. The first is written on a goblet:

أحرقوني بالنار يستنطقوني\\وجدوني على البلاءِ صبورًا
لأجل هذا حُمِلت فوق الأيادي\\ولثمتُ من الملاح الثغورا

Translation:

For my confession they burned me with fire
And found that I was for endurance made.
Hence I was borne high on the hands of men
And given to kiss the lips of pretty maid.

The second is written on a chessboard:

جيشان يقتتلان طول نهارهم\\وقتالهم فى كل وقت زايد
حتى إذا جن الظلام عليهم\\ناما جميعاً فى فراشٍ واحد

Translation:

Two armies all day long with arms contend,
Bringing the battle always to a head.
But when night's cover on them does descend
The two go sleeping in a single bed.

However, several stories in later manuscripts of the Nights do involve riddles. For example, a perhaps tenth-century CE story about the legendary poet Imru' al-Qais features him insisting that he will marry only the woman who can say which eight, four, and two are. Rather than 'fourteen', the answer is the number of teats on, respectively, a dog, a camel, and a woman. In the face of other challenges, successful prosecution of al-Qais's marriage continues to depend on the wit of his new fiancée.

== Folk riddles ==
Riddles have been collected by scholars throughout the Arabic-speaking world, and we can arguably 'speak of the Arabic riddle as a discrete phenomenon'. Examples of modern riddles, as categorised and selected by Chyet, are:

- Nonoppositional
  - Literal: Werqa ‘ala werqa, ma hiya? (l-beṣla) [leaf upon leaf, what is she? (an onion)] (Morocco)
  - Metaphorical: Madīnatun ḥamrā’, ǧidrānuhā ḩaḍrā’, miftāḥuḥa ḥadīd, wa-sukkānuhā ‘abīd (il-baṭṭīḩ) [a red city, its walls are green, its key is iron, and its inhabitants are black slaves (watermelon)] (Palestine)
  - Solution included in the question: Ḩiyār ismo w-aḩḍar ǧismo, Allāh yihdīk ‘alā smo (il-ḩiyār) ['Ḩiyār {='cucumber'} is its name and green its body, may God lead you to its name [=to what it is] (cucumber)] (Palestine)
- Oppositional
  - Antithetical contradictive (only one of two descriptive elements can be true): Kebīra kēf el-fīl, u-tenṣarr fī mendīl (nāmūsīya) [big as an elephant, and folds up into a handkerchief (mosquito net)] (Libya)
  - Privational contradictive (second descriptive element denies a characteristic of the first descriptive element): Yemšī blā rās, u-yeqtel blā rṣāṣ (en-nher) [goes without a head, and kills without lead (a river)] (Algeria)
    - Inverse privational contradictive: Gaz l-wad ‘ala ržel (‘okkaz) [crossed the river on one leg (walking stick/cane)] (Morocco)
  - Causal contradictive (things don't add up as expected; a time dimension is involved): Ḩlug eš bāb, kber u-šāb, u-māt eš bāb (el-gamra) [was born a youth, grew old and white, and died a youth (the moon)] (Tunisia)
- Contrastive (a pair of binary, non-oppositional complements contrasted with each other): mekkēn fī kakar, akkān dā ġāb, dāk ḥaḍar (iš-šams wil-gamar) [two kings on a throne, if one is absent, the other is present (the sun and the moon)] (Sudan)
- Compound (with multiple descriptive elements, falling into different categories from those just listed): Šē yākul min ġēr fumm, in akal ‘āš, w-in širib māt (in-nār) [a thing which eats without a mouth, if it eats it lives, and if it drinks it dies (fire)] (Egypt)

=== Collections and indices ===
- Giacobetti, A., Recueil d’enigmes arabes populaires (Algiers 1916)
- Hillelson, S., 'Arabic Proverbs, Sayings, Riddles and Popular Beliefs', Sudan Notes and Records, 4.2 (1921), 76–86
- Ruoff, Erich (ed. and trans.), Arabische Rätsel, gesammelt, übersetzt und erläutert: ein Beitrag zur Volkskunde Palästinas (Laupp, 1933).
- Littmann, Enno (ed.), Morgenländische Spruchweisheit: Arabische Sprichwörter und Rätsel. Aus mündlicher Überlieferung gesammelt und übtertragen, Morgenland. Darstellungen aus Geschichte und Kultur des Ostens, 29 (Leipzig, 1937)
- Quemeneur, J., Enigmes tunisiennes (Tunis 1937)
- Ibn Azzuz, M. and Rodolfo Gil, 'Coleccion de adivinanzas marroquies', Boletín de la Asociación Española de Orientalistas, 14 (1978), 187-204
- Dubus, André, 'Énigmes tunisiennes', IBLA, 53 no. 170 (1992), 235–74; 54 no. 171 (1993), 73-99
- El-Shamy, Hasan M., Folk Traditions of the Arab World: A Guide to Motif Classification, 2 vols (Bloomington: Indiana University Press, 1995)
- Heath, Jeffrey, Hassaniya Arabic (Mali): Poetic and Ethnographic Texts (Wiesbaden: Harrassowitz, 2003), pp. 186–87
- Mohamed-Baba, Ahmed-Salem Ould, 'Estudio de algunas expressiones fijas: las adivinanzas, acertijos y enigmas en Hassaniyya', Estudios de dialectología norteafricana y andalusí, 8 (2004), 135-147
- Mohamed Baba, Ahmed Salem Ould, 'Tradición oral ḥassāní: el léxico nómada de las adivinanzas' [Ḥassāní oral tradition: the nomadic lexicon of the riddles], Anaquel de Estudios Árabes, 27 (2016), 143-50 doi:10.5209/rev_ANQE.2016.v27.47970.

==== Malta ====
- Arberry, A. J., A Maltese Anthology (Oxford: Clarendon Press, 1960), pp. 1–37 (riddles alongside proverbs, folktales, etc., in English translation)
- Joseph, Cassar-Pullicino, H̄aġa moh̄ġaġa u tah̄bil il-moh̄h̄ ich̄or, Il-Folklore taʾ Malta u Gh̄awdex, 1-3, 3 vols (Malta, 1957-1958) (cf. 'Towards an Analysis of Maltese Riddles', Scientia, 35 (1972), 41-42, 85-91, 139-144, 181-189; 36 (1973), 37-39.
- Stumme, H. Maltesische Märchen, Gedichte und Rätsel in deutscher Übersetzung, Leipziger Semitistische Studien, I.5 (Leipzig: J.C. Hinrichs 1904) (Maltese fairytales, poems and riddles in German translation)

== Influence ==
Arabic riddle-traditions also influenced medieval Hebrew poetry. One prominent Hebrew exponent of the form is the medieval Andalusian poet Judah Halevi, who for example wrote

What's slender, smooth and fine,
and speaks with power while dumb,
in utter silence kills,
and spews the blood of lambs?

(The answer is 'a pen'.)

== See also ==
- Riddle
- Riddles (Hebrew)
- Riddles (Persian)
- Wasf
