= Abu al-Ma'ali al-Haziri =

Notable Iraqi scribe credited for early riddles

Abū al-Maʿālī Saʿd ibn ʿAlī al-Ḥaẓīrī (Arabic:أبو المعالي سعد بن علي الحَظِيري) , often known as Dallāl al-kutub ('the Book Merchant') (fl. twelfth century CE), was a book-merchant, scribe and littérateur from Iraq. He is noted for composing the first known Arabic text entirely devoted to riddles, the Kitāb al-iʿjāz fī l-aḥājī wa-l-alghāz (Inimitable Book on Quizzes and Riddles).

== Life ==
Al-Ḥaẓīrī's epithet records his birthplace, the village of al-Ḥaẓīra, to the north of Baghdad. He moved to Baghdad early in his life. There he came to establish a bookshop at Bāb Badr in Baghdad's book market, which became such a nodal point in the intellectual life of the city that it became the setting for al-Maqāma al-Baġdādiyya by al-Wahrānī (d. 575/1179); this work speaks of 'the shop of the sheikh Abū l-Maʿālī (…) He is the orchard of erudition, the archive of the Arabs (…) he has a share in every branch of learning'.

At one time or another, al-Ḥaẓīrī travelled to Syria and thence on hajj to Medina and Mecca, but seems otherwise to have been based in Baghdad.

Al-Ḥaẓīrī's teachers included al-Jawāliqī (d. 539/1144-45), Ibn al-Shajarī (d. 542/1147-48), and his wide network of associates included the preacher Abū Manṣūr al-ʿAbbādī (491-547/1098-1152-53), the ascetic Abū ʿAbdallāh al-Fāriqī (d. 564/1168-69), the noted poet Ibn Aflaḥ (d. c. 535-37/1141-43), the scribe ʿImād ad-Dīn al-Iṣbahānī (519-97/1125-1201), the physician al-Ḥakīm al-Maghribī (d. 549/1154), and the grammarian Ibn al-Khashshāb (492-567/1099-1172). His patrons included the caliphs al-Muqtafī (r. 530-55/1136-60) and al-Mustanjid (r. 555-66/1160-70).

Al-Ḥaẓīrī died in 568 AH, 1172 CE.

== Works ==
In honour of the writing of his friend Abū Manṣūr al-ʿAbbādī, al-Ḥaẓīrī reportedly composed the compilation al-Nūr al-bādī min kalām al-ʿAbbādī, along with al-Kalim al-Fāriqiyya fī al-kilam al-Ilāhiyya in honour of Abū ʿAbdallāh al-Fāriqī. To caliph al-Muqtafī he dedicated the work Lumaḥ al-mulaḥ (Sparkles of Witticisms), an anthology focusing on examples of paronomasia from both verse and prose. Almost entirely lost, too, is his Zīnat al-dahr wa-ʿaṣrat ahl al-ʿaṣr (The Adornment of the Age and the Contemporaries' Very Best), but it is known to have influenced al-Iṣbahānī's Kharīda. Twenty private epistles, their style also characterised by paronomasia, do survive, along with a number of poems, mostly epigrams (and especially love-epigrams).

One work of Al-Ḥaẓīrī's survives in whole, however: his Kitāb al-iʿjāz fī l-aḥājī wa-l-alghāz bi-rasm al-amīr Qaymāz (Inimitable Book on Quizzes and Riddles, Composed for the Emir Qaymāz), commissioned by and dedicated to emir Mujāhid al-Dīn Qaymāz al-Zaynī (d. 595/1198-99), of which four manuscripts are known:

1. Mashhad, Library of the Shrine of Imam Reza, Adabīyāt (15), No. 2
2. Dār al-Kutub al-Miṣriyya, Adab No. 498 (215 folios). Eighth-century AH.
3. Dār al-Kutub al-Miṣriyya, Balāġa Taymūr No. 71. 1299AH/1881-82CE.
4. al-Kāẓimiyya, Baghdad, library of Dr. Ḥusayn ʿAlī Maḥfūẓ. A copy by Maḥfūẓ of the Mashhad manuscript.

It seems to have been composed during the reign of Caliph al-Muqtafī (1136–60CE). Although some poems from it have been printed, as of 2019 the work had never been edited as a whole. According to the preface, 'upon his return from the hajj, Mujāhid ad-Dīn Qaymāz, who during his trip had been entertained with riddles as his fellow-travellers avidly engaged in riddle contests, searched for a book on this subject and having found none, commissioned al-Ḥaẓīrī to compose this work'.

In the manuscript Adab No. 498, the book begins with a sixteen-folio essay on riddles followed by an anthology of riddles of around two hundred folios. The introductory essay discusses criticisms of the riddle form, examples from ḥadīth literature showing the legitimacy of puzzles, al-Ḥaẓīrī's classification of different types of riddles, and the Arabic terminology by which riddles are referred to. It is the first surviving substantial discussion of riddles in Arabic.

The anthology itself, in Adab No. 498, contains 863 riddles (823 in verse, totalling around 3300 lines, and 40 in prose), of which 600 are attributed to named authors; 94 different authors and solvers are named. Around 640 of the riddles seem not to be recorded elsewhere. Al-Ḥaẓīrī usually provides explanations of each, usually his own (but quoting 18 solution poems and 11 prose explanations by others), as well as commentary on their quality; forty-four riddles are left unsolved. Most of the riddles are true riddles (based on metaphor alone), but 111 are muʿammayāt (riddles based on revealing the letters which comprise the solution).

Authors prominently represented in the anthology are:

- Dhū r-Rumma (3 poems; d. c. 715)
- Abū Nuwās (7 poems; d. c. 814)
- Ibn al-Muʿtazz (4 poems, 3 of which are included anonymously; d. 908)
- Abū l-Faḍl Ibn al-ʿAmīd (3 poems; d. 970)
- As-Sarī ar-Raffāʾ (10 poems; d. 973)
- Abū Ṭālib al-Maʾmūnī (24 poems; d. 993)
- aṣ-Ṣāḥib Ibn ʿAbbād (4 poems; d. 995)
- Badīʿ az-Zamān al-Hamaḏānī (22 poems; d. 1007)
- Abū Hilāl al-ʿAskarī (29 poems; d. 1010)
- Mihyār ad-Daylamī (16 poems; d. 1037)
- Abū al-ʿAbbās aḍ-Ḍabbī (9 poems; fl. c. 1000)
- Abū al-Ḥasan al-Juhrumī (20 poems; d. 1042)
- Abū al-Qāsim Ibn al-Muṭarriz (19 poems; d. 1047-48)
- Abū al-ʿAlāʾ al-Maʿarrī (112 poems; d. 1057)
- Abū ʿAmr al-Ḥasan ibn ʿAlī (74 poems and ten prose riddles; fl. second half of the eleventh century)
- Abū ʿAlī Ibn Shibl (11 poems; d. 1080-82)
- Ibn Nāqiyā (10 poems; d. 1092)
- Ibn at-Tilmīdh (5 poems; d. 1165)
