= Uḥjiyyat al-ʿArab =

The Uḥjiyyat al-ʿArab ('riddle-poem of the Arabs') is a qaṣīda by the early eighth-century CE poet Dhū al-rumma containing the earliest substantial collection of Arabic riddles, thought to have been influential on later Arabic verse riddlers, and perhaps on Arabic ekphrastic poetry more widely.

== Content ==
=== Nasīb ===
Like most qaṣīdas, the poem begins with a nasīb (lines 1–14). Here Dhū al-rumma describes himself surveying the desert by night and day, yearning for Mayya, his beloved. In the summary of Abdul Jabbar Yusuf Muttalibi, Dhū al-rumma goes on (in lines 7–14) to describe

a gazelle grazing amongst sands which the heavy rain of the morning has dressed with rich green leaves. Seeing a human being at that isolated place, it comes forward, yet shows in her behaviour nothing but panic. This panic-stricken gazelle amidst that green pasture is not more beautiful than Mayya on that evening when she tried to wound your heart with a face as pure as the gleaming sun, as though the sight of it were to re-open the wound in this heart. And with an eye as though the two Babylonians (Harut and Marut) had set a charm upon your heart on the day of Marqula, and with a mouth of well-set teeth like lilies growing in a pure sandy plain neither close to saline land nor to the salt of the sea. And with a white neck and upper breast, pure white when not yellowed from the sprinkling of saffron.

=== Raḥīl ===
The nasīb is followed by a description of travel through the desert (lines 15–26). Muttalibi in particular notes the imagery of lines 20 and 22:

طواهن قول الركب: سيروا إذا اكتسى\\من الليل أعلى كل رابية خدرا

Translation:

They [the camels] have become lean through their riders' saying 'Move on' when the brow of every hill appears, because of the dark night, like a tent.

وأرض فلاة تسحل الريح متنها\\كساها سواد الليل أردية خضراً

Translation:

And many an empty land whose surface the wind scores is clothed by the blackness of night in dark green garments.

=== Riddles ===
Finally, the body of the poem constitutes a number of enigmatic statements (lines 28–72). As would be usual in the praise-poetry that often constitutes this section of a qaṣīda, each statement begins with the exclamatory syllable known in Arabic as wāw rubba. The poem includes no solutions to these riddles, and different manuscripts include slightly different material and in different orders; thus they have been the source of scholarly discussion since as early as Abū Naṣr Aḥmad ibn Ḥātim al-Bāhilī (d. 846 CE), who wrote a commentary on Dhū al-rumma's work that may have been particularly prompted by Dhū al-rumma's riddling. One example of these riddles, on the egg, is as follows:

ومَيِّتَةِ ٱلْأَجْلَادِ يَحْيِا جَنِينُهَا\\لِأَوَّلِ حَمْلٍ ثُمَّ يُورِثُهَا عَقْرَا

Translation:

so, a whole body, dead; her foetus lives, * at first an embryo, he then makes her inherit barrenness.

In the line-numbering of ʿAbd al-Qaddūs Abū Ṣāliḥ, giving the solutions offered by Nefeli Papoutsakis and Carlile Henry Hayes Macartney, the riddles have been thought to have the following solutions:

| lines | Papoutsakis | Macartney |
|---|---|---|
| 28–36 | fire produced by the friction of two pieces of wood (zandān) from the same tree | fire-stick |
| 37–38 | ant-hill | ant-hill |
| 39 | bread baked under the ashes | cake of bread |
| 40 | the liver of a slaughtered camel | forge-bellows |
| 41 | heart | the heart of a sheep slain for guests |
| 42 | water-skin | the camel butchered for food |
| 43–44 | lizard | the Umm hubayn or Qaṭā |
| 45–46 | night or the swallow | night (or sand-martin, or bat) |
| 47 | 'apparently' the firmament | — |
| 48 | wine-skin | — |
| 49 | egg | egg |
| 50–51 | the peg of the hand-mill | tent-peg |
| 52 | a girl's mouth | thunder-shower or lady's mouth |
| 53 | tongue | well-bucket |
| 54 | roasting-fork | spit |
| 55 | wine-jar | wine-flask |
| 56–59 | colocynth shrub | colocynth shrub |
| 60 | sandgrouse | sandgrouse |
| 61–62 | the sun | the sun |
| 63–64 | quiver | quiver |
| 65–67 | javelin and flag | javelin |
| 68 | tent-pins | tent-skewer |
| 69 | eye | eye |
| 70 | notch of an arrow | notch of an arrow |
| 71 | truffle | truffles |
| 72 | tongue | — |

== Editions ==
- ʿAbd al-Qaddūs Abū Ṣāliḥ (ed.), Dīwān Dhī l-Rumma. Sharḥ Abī Naṣr al-Bāhilī, riwāyat Thaʿlab, 3 vols (Beirut 1994), pp. 1411–50 [poem 49, with commentary pp. 2044ff]
- Carlile Henry Hayes Macartney (ed.), The dîwân of Ghailân Ibn ʿUqbah known as Dhu ’r-Rummah (Cambridge: Cambridge University Press, 1919), pp. 169–83 [poem 24]
