= Persian riddles =

The Persian term for riddle is chīstān (Persian: چیسْتان), literally 'what is it?', a word that frequently occurs in the opening formulae of Persian riddles. However, the Arabic loan-word lughaz is also used. Traditional Persian rhetorical manuals almost always handle riddles, but Persian riddles have enjoyed little modern scholarly attention. Yet in the assessment of A. A. Seyed-Gohrab, 'Persian literary riddles provide us with some of the most novel and intricate metaphors and images in Persian poetry'.

== Genres and their histories ==
Persian riddles occur in several different literary forms, and it is helpful to trace the history of the Persian riddle through these forms. It is assumed that folk-riddles circulated in Persian from early times, and riddles are prominent in Persian romances set in earlier, pre-Islamic times, perhaps indicating the earlier popularity of the form. Erotic allusions are common in medieval Persian riddles, as in other kinds of metaphorical description.

=== Medieval period ===
It is unclear how medieval Persian riddles were actually performed. Whereas the genre of conundrum known as mu‘ammā circulated in manuscripts without solutions, riddles were provided with their solutions in medieval and later manuscripts, so it is possible that poets would announce the solution before performing the riddle.

==== Literary, descriptive riddles ====
These riddles overlap with and blur into the literary genre of wasf (detailed, metaphorical description), usually appearing in the opening section (nasīb) of a qasīdah. It seems clear that the literary riddle emerged from wasf. This genre includes the earliest attested Persian riddles, from around the ninth to eleventh centuries. Some examples may not originally have been riddles, but rather metaphorical descriptions that, in transmission, became divorced from their original contexts, coming to seem like riddles in the process. One example is this anonymous one, cited by Shams-i Qeys in his Kitāb al-mu‘jam:

What is it that tears into small pieces
whatever falls in its toothless mouth?
If you put your fingers in its eyes
it will instantly prick up its ears.

The answer is 'scissors'.

As the hugely popular descriptive literature in the khorāsānī style became increasingly metaphorical, so too it necessarily became more riddle-like, and by the eleventh century an 'almost codified form of riddle' can be identified, though the boundary between riddle and description is very hard to draw: texts which are unambiguously to be categorised as riddles are not numerous and the process whereby the riddle emerged as a literary form is not altogether clear. However, key exponents of the descriptive riddle form were the innovative poet Mas‘ūd Sā‘d Salmān (d. 1121), who composed at least twelve riddles or riddle-like descriptions, his successors ‘Uthmān Mukhtārī (d. 1118×21) and Ḥakīm Sanā’ī (d. 1131×41), and Amīr Mu‘izzī (d. 1125), whose divan includes fourteen riddles. An example is the following riddle by Amīr Mu‘izzī, which involves a series of puns on the different meanings of the word tir ('rank, importance; Mercury, associated with scribes and scholars; arrow'):

What is that body that has received tir [importance] from the tir of the sky [Mercury]?
It has the form of a tir [arrow]; it has set the empire as straight as a tir [arrow].
When it weeps, the soul will smile in the body;
When it cries out, the tir [Mercury] will exult in the sky.
When it sheds tears, it displays precious jewels,
Through its sound, it brings reports of struggles of the mind.
Whatever nature can conceive, it collates
And comments on whatever the imagination generates.

Later literary riddles tend to be very obscure in style, even to the point of being unsolvable today.

==== Wisdom-contests in epic romance ====
Several Persian romances include some kind of test of verbal wisdom. The earliest is ‘Unṣurī's eleventh-century Vāmiq u ‘Adhrā, but the one most clearly conforming to the riddle genre occurs in the renowned Shāh Nāma, when Manuchehr asks six Zoroastrian priests to test the wits of Zāl in his suit for Rūdāba. These are less obscure than the descriptive riddles, tending to feature metaphors and tropes which anyone familiar with Persian poetic conventions could be expected to recognise. For example, in the Shāh Nāma (taking just one variant of a text that varies dramatically from one manuscript to another),

Another priest said: 'O proud warrior:
there are two noble and fleet horses
One of them is like a black sea,
the other glistens like white crystal.
They are both exerting themselves, racing in haste
But neither can catch the other.

Zāl answers this riddle as follows:

The two running horses, black and white
that cannot catch each other in the race:
Know, O puzzler, that they are night and day,
in order that you may feel puzzlement.

==== Ethico-philosophical riddles ====
A very specific type of riddle appears in the twelfth century, in ethico-philosophical epics, in a form probably invented by ‘Uthmān Mukhtārī, who used it in his Hunar-nāma: the riddle comprises ten couplets posing ethical questions, followed by two couplets in which the poet delivers his answers. One example is the following riddle (Hunar-nāma couplets 343–52):

He said: 'What then is that yielding twig,
the cloud of prosperity and the sun of liberality,
The face of generosity and the body of magnanimity,
the essence of pleasure and the substance of gaiety,
The title of confirmation and the letter of conferral,
the source of sustenance and the Fountain of Life,
The source of generosity and the origin of reward,
the ocean of excellence and the mine of bounty,
The ornament and beauty of the seal and the dagger,
the dwelling and haven of victory and conquest.
It is disdain for gold and scorn for coins,
it is the boast of the reins and honours the pen.
Were the cloud to adopt its habits,
it would shelter all men, indiscriminately.
If the sun left its traces as this thing does,
mountains would turn into jewels and deserts to gold.
Its movements are the vanguards of reward,
its forehead gives light to bounty's eyes.
In the time of struggle, it is stronger than the ocean,
in the hour of giving, more generous than heaven.'

The narrator provides the following solution:

I said: 'This is the hand of the free-giving king,
Lord of the world and the kingdom's master.
So long as water, earth, fire and wind exist,
may his grip on the world be absolute.'

==== Occasional riddles ====
Medieval Persian literature also attests to numerous qit‘as (quatrains) posing varied, often occasional, tests of wit.

==== Mu‘ammā ====
Persian also adopted the conundrum form mu‘ammā from Arabic. These conundrums are in verse, do not include an interrogatory element, and involve clues as to the letters or sounds of the word. The main study is by Shama Anwari-Alhosseyni.

=== Folk riddles ===
Although folk riddles are not attested until relatively recently, it is assumed that they existed from ancient times onwards, predating and informing the medieval literary riddle tradition. It appears that the main collection remains that published by Charles Scott in 1965.

Scott identifies the following (sometimes overlapping) key forms in his riddles, which were collected in the earlier twentieth century in Teheran and Afghanistan:

- Riddles with an equivalent number of syllables in each line. The most populous category. Many are just two lines long, but some extend to three (Teheran) or six (Afghanistan) and may rhyme.
- Riddles with the introductory formula ʔan čist (ke)... (Teheran) or u(ʔan) čis(t) ke (Afghanistan) ('what is that (which)...').
- Riddles structured around the connectives hæm ... hæm ... ('both ... and ...') (Teheran only). The solutions to these riddles are words with two meanings.
- Riddles comprising a single phrase (Afghanistan only).

Examples of the four types follow:

siyodó sefìd púš nešæstǽn
yék sòrx púš bærášun míræqse
dæháno dændán

Translation:

Thirty-two clad in white are sitting.
One clad in red is dancing over them.
Mouth and teeth.

(Teheran, equivalent number of syllables per line)

dó næfær hǽrče midæván
behǽm némiræsǽn
šæborúz or čærxáye dočærxé

Translation:

They [are] two people. However much they run,
They never reach each other.
Night and day or wheels of a bicycle

(Teheran, equivalent number of syllables per line, rhyming)

ʔán číst ke xæfáš mesálæst bæ róz
dær xɪlwǽte šæb hæmnæfáse gɪriyǽʔo sóz
mumindÍlo safitǽno ʔæfróxtæ róx
šǽb xézo sæhærnɪšíno májlɪs ʔæfróz
šǽm

Translation:

What is that which is bat-like during the day,
In the peace of evening is companion to weeping and burning pain,
Heart of wax and transparent body and bridge face,
Rises in the evening, rests in the morning, and [is] lively company.
A candle

(Afghanistan, rhyme aaba, following the quatrain pattern known as čar bayti also used in folk lyrics.)

hǽm dær bædǽne ʔensánæst hæm dær mašín
dændé

Translation:

It exists both in the human body and in a machine.
dænde (1. 'tooth', 2. 'cog')

(Teheran)

gošt darǽ ustoxán nè
kérm

Translation:

It has meat [but] no bone.
A worm

(Afghanistan, single phrase)

==== čɪstan čɪstan čis ====
Scott also records a riddle-game of a highly formulaic kind from Afghan informants. The speaker (S) requires the hearer (H) to guess a real-life family of their acquaintance by enumerating its members, concluding with the formula 'ešan zænu šuy' ('they, wife and husband') on the pattern of this example:

S: čɪstan čɪstan čís
H: dær xáne kís
S: dær xané an šǽxse ké
dú bačǽ darǽ yǽk doxtǽr
ešán zǽnu šúy
H: [gives the name of some family member meeting this description]

Translation:

S: A riddle, a riddle, what is it?
H: In whose house is it?
S: In the house of that person who
Has two boys, one daughter,
They, wife and husband.
H: [gives the name of some family member meeting this description]

If the hearer fails to guess the answer, they must pretend to grant a city to the speaker, through the following formula:

S: xay šar bɪti.
H: xo, yazni æz tu.
S: xo, yazni æz ma. ziyaratayša ziyarat konum. jayay xubiša begærdum, mewayša boxorum. jayay xærabIš kamil æz tu. tærmami čizay xubiš æz ma, xarabayš æz tu. čIra nægVfti ke xane salimina.

Translation:

S: Then give a city.
H: All right, Ghazni for you.
S: All right, Ghazni for me. May I visit its shrines. May I wander about its good places, may I eat its fruits. All its bad places are yours. All its good things for me, its bad things for you. Why didn't you say that [it is] the house of the Salims?

== See also ==
- Riddle
- Riddles (Arabic)
- Wasf
