= Al-Dabbi =

Al-Dabbi may refer to:

- Al-Mufaddal ad-Dabbi (8th century), Arabic philologist of the Kufan school
- Abu al-'Abbas al-Dabbi (fl. c. 1000), poet
- Anbasah ibn Ishaq al-Dabbi (died c. 860), Abbasid provincial governor
- Abu Ja'far Ahmad ibn Yahya al-Dabbi (died c. 1202), Andalusi historian
- Abdallah ibn al-Musayyab al-Dabbi (fl. 790s), Abbasid governor of Egypt
