= Husayn ibn Ahmad =

Husayn ibn Ahmad is an Arabic name that may refer to:

- Abd Allah al-Radi (died 881), tenth Isma'ili Imam and father of Abd Allah al-Mahdi Billah, founder of the Fatimid Caliphate
- Abu Abdallah al-Shi'i (died 911), Isma'ili missionary active in Yemen and in North Africa among the Kutama Berbers
- Abu Ali al-Husayn ibn Ahmad al-Madhara'i, also known as Abu Zunbur, 10th-century Abbasid official in Egypt and Syria
- Abu Abdallah al-Husayn ibn Ahmad al-Mughallis, 10th-century poet and composer of riddles working at the Buyid court
- Husyan ibn Ahmad, ruled over the Bedouin tribes in Syria as the amir al-ʿarab under the Ottomans in c. 1618
