= Ibn Farhun =

14th century jurist and biographer

Ibn Farḥūn
- Born: 1358 AD / 760 AH; Medina
- Died: 1397 AD / 799 AH
- Other names: Ibrāhīm ibn ‘Alī ibn Muḥammad, Ibn Farḥūn, Burhanuddin al-Amari.

Academic work
- Main interests: Maliki history, biography and fiqh (jurisprudence)
- Notable works: Al-dībāj al-mudhhab fī ma‘rifat a‘yān ‘ulamā’ al-madhhab; Tabṣirat al-ḥukkām fī uṣūl al-aqḍiya wa-manāhij al-aḥkām

Ibn Farḥūn al-Mālikī—full name; Ibrāhīm b. ‘Alī b. M. Ibn Farḥūn, Burhān al-Dīn al-Ya’marī al-Andalusī al-Mālikī (Arabic: إبراهيم بن علي بن محمد، ابن فرحون، برهان الدين اليعمري) (ca.1358 - 1397) was an Arab Mālikī faqīh (jurist) of Medina. born into a prominent Arab family that traced its descent to Quraysh. He traveled to Egypt, Levant (Syria) and Jerusalem. In 1390 he returned to Medina, where he professed adherence to Maliki Islam and became qāḍa (judge). His principal biographer, Aḥmad Bābā attributes eight books to him. Only two MSS have been published, while three are lost.

== Works ==
- Al-dībāj al-mudhhab fī ma‘rifat a‘yān ‘ulamā’ al-madhhab; popularly known as Al-Dībāj, a biographical dictionary of Mālikī ‘ulamā’ (scholars) and comprehensive history of Malikite thought and scholarship of the school in Al-Andalus and the Maghreb, its rites, biography of its founder Mālik ibn Anas and bibliography. Supplements and abridgements include Nayl al-ibtihāj the edition with Aḥmad Bābā (Cairo, 1351/1932).
- Tabṣirat al-ḥukkām fī uṣūl al-aqḍiya wa-manāhij al-aḥkām; manual of legal procedures, rules of evidence, etc.
- Durrat al-ghawwāṣ fī muḥāḍarat al-khawāṣṣ (درة الغواص في محاضرة الخواص, 'the pearl-diver's prize on the discourse of elites'); treatise on legal riddles.
- Kashf al-niqāb al-ḥājib 'an muṣṭalaḥ Ibn al-Ḥājib (كشف النقاب الحاجب عن مصطلح ابن الحاجب);
- Irshād al-sālik ilá afʻāl al-manāsik (إرشاد السالك إلى أفعال المناسك);

== Bibliography ==
- Aḥmad Bābā, Aḥmad (2004). Nayl al-ibtihāj i bi-taṭrīz al-Dībāj. Maktabat al-ṭabaqāt al-Mālikīyah (in Arabic). al-Qāhirah: Maktabat al-Thaqāfah al-Dīnīyah. pp. 33–35.
- Basset, René (1905). Recueil de memoires et de textes publics en l'honneur du XIVme Congrès des Orientalistes (in French). Alger: P Fontana. p. 9.
- Brockelmann, Carl (1902). Geschichte der arabischen Litteratur (in German). Vol. II. E. Felber. pp. 175, 263. ISBN 9789004104075.
- Hopkins, J.F.P. (1986). "Ibn Farḥūn". The Encyclopaedia of Islam. Vol. 3 (New ed.). Leiden: Brill.
- Ibn Farḥūn, Ibrāhīm ibn ʻAlī. al-Dībāj al-mudhahhab fī maʻrifat aʻyān ʻulamāʼ al-madhhab (in Arabic). pp. 124–6.
- Pons Boigues, Francisco (1898). Ensayo bio-bibliográfico sobre los historiadores y geógrafos arábigo-españoles; obra premiada por la Biblioteca Nacional en el concurso público de 1893 (in Spanish). Madrid: S.F. de Sales. pp. 348–9 (§298).
- Wüstenfeld, Ferdinand (1882). "III". Die Geschichtschreiber der Araber und ihre Werke (in German). Wien. p. 22 (§448).

== See also ==
- List of Arab scientists and scholars
- Encyclopædia Britannica Online
