= Uthman Mukhtari =

Persian poet

Abū ‘Umar ‘Uthmān b. ‘Umar Mukhtārī Ghaznavī (born c. 467/1074-75, died 513×15/1118×21) was a Persian poet of the Ghaznavids, an empire originating from Ghazna located in Afghanistan. He had patrons at the courts of the Qarakhānids, the Seljūqs of Kirman, and the Ismaili ruler of Tabas.

In the assessment of A. A. Seyed-Gohrab,

in Persian literary history, he is known for his detailed and extensive poetic descriptions (vaṣf) and his interest in literary riddles. His ability lies first of all in the minute description of courtly events such as royal banquets, hunting grounds, battlefields, and Islamic and pre-Islamic Persian festivals.

Originating from Ghazna, he is thought to have written the Shahryar-nama, which describes the struggles of Muslims against Indian heathens during the Ghaznavid era. The epic was composed in 3 years. Parts of it remain in the British Museum. While at Tabas in 500-508 (1105–13), he composed the Hunar-nāma, dedicating it to the ruler of Tabas, Yamīm al-Dowla, one of the Ismaili aristocrats of Quhistān.

He was a great fan of Masud Sa'd Salman.

== See also ==
- List of Persian poets and authors
- Persian literature
