= Hebrew riddles =

Traditional form of word-play in Hebrew

Manuscript of riddles by Yehuda haLevi in his own hand (colours inverted), from the Cairo Genizah. (Cambridge, Cambridge University Library, Taylor-Schechter Misc. 8/47 recto.) The text says: Top right-hand text (at 90° to image orientation) 1 מלתזם בית אלמתאת'ם [ג'לאל]תה אל[ ] 2 יא מולאי וסיידי אלאג'ל ואלמולאי וסנדי אלאפצ'ל אלאכמל [ ] 3 ג'לאל ומתצל אלסעד ואלאקבאל כתאבי [ ] אל [ ] 4 אפט'ע ואלמצאב אלאכ'שע ואלנביה אלאכ'שע מא כאן מן קדר [ ] 5 וחתמה אלסאדק אמנה ומולאי וסנדי אלא[פצ'ל אלאכמל Bottom right-hand text 6 ראיתם דג אשר בלע ליונה 7 ותשבחות לעם ארץ בסודי 8 והבא ראש חמור עליו עטרת 9 ונחן 10 והעח נהפכו מעיו והקיא 11 אשר בלה ומצאחי ידידי Left-hand column: 12 ועלמה שחרה דודה. וידה פרשה לעב. 13 וידה הפכה ומת. 14 והעת הפכה ידה. בצמא מת וגם רעב. 15 כתבנית יד עלי ראש מחמדי. 16 והוא יושב בצד חיקה ושוכב. 17 יצק שמו עבדיהו. 18 עלי צואר בכור צידון. 19 קחי יונה אשר ישנה לצדי. 20 שלומותי ושא אל מחמדי. 21 והרוצה להפליא שם ידידו. 22 שמו הטוב יהי יוצר עלי חק. 23 ואת ראש יוצרו יכרות בידו. 24 ויתלהו כוו מחץ לרחוק. 25 חצי עצים חצי אלים תחבר 26 תקבר. 27 וביניהם כמספרם חכנס.

Riddles in Hebrew are referred to as חידות ḥidot (singular חִידָה ḥidah). They have at times been a major and distinctive part of literature in Hebrew and closely related languages. At times they have a complex relationship with proverbs.

== In the Bible ==
Riddles are not common in the Bible, though other tests of verbal wit are. The most prominent riddle in the Bible is Samson's riddle: Samson outwitted the Philistines by posing a riddle about the lion and the beehive until they learned the answer from his Philistine bride, costing Samson 30 suits of clothes (Judges 14:5-18). In the Book of Proverbs, it mentions "the words of the wise and their riddles." In Proverbs 30:15, in which sets of three or four objects are mentioned were likely originally in the form of riddles. In Ezekiel 17:1-10 is also a riddle of sorts as well as in Habakkuk 2:6-20.

== In post-Biblical and rabbinic literature ==
Riddles are not common in Midrashic literature, but some are found. For example, the Lamentations Rabbah, composed around the middle of the first millennium CE, expounds the first verse of the Book of Lamentations by telling eleven stories in which Jerusalemites outwit Athenians. Most of these are in some sense riddlic; the one most straightforwardly containing a riddle features schoolboys asking "what is this thing: nine go out and eight are complete, and twenty-four serve, and two pour, and one drinks". These numbers turn out to refer respectively to nine months of pregnancy, eight days between birth and circumcision, twenty-four months of breastfeeding, two breasts, and one baby.

Sirach mentions riddles as a popular dinner pastime.

The Talmud contains several riddles, such as this one from the end of Kinnim: 'What animal has one voice living and seven voices dead?' ('The ibis, from whose carcass seven different musical instruments are made').

The Aramaic Story of Ahikar contains a long section of proverbial wisdom that in some versions also contains riddles.

=== Solomon and the Queen of Sheba ===
The Bible describes how the Queen of Sheba tests Solomon with riddles, but without giving any hint as to what they were. On this basis, riddles were ascribed to the Queen in later writings (see: Colloquy of the Queen of Sheba). Four riddles are ascribed to her in the tenth- or eleventh-century Midrash Proverbs, including the following: 'She said to him: "Seven exit and nine enter, two pour and one drinks". He said to her: "Surely, seven days of menstruation exit and nine months of pregnancy enter, two breasts pour and the baby drinks".’ These plus another fourteen or fifteen tests of wisdom, some of which are riddles, appear in the Midrash ha-Ḥefez (1430 CE), for example:

- There is an enclosure with ten doors: when one is open nine are shut; when nine are open, one is shut. — The womb, the bodily orifices, and the umbilical cord.
- Living, moves not, yet when its head is cut off it moves. — A ship in the sea (made from a tree).
- What was that which is produced from the ground, yet produces it, while its food is the fruit of the ground? — A wick.

The early medieval Aramaic Targum Sheni also contains three riddles posed by the Queen to Solomon.

== In medieval verse ==
Under the influence of Arabic literature in medieval al-Andalus, there was a flourishing of literary Hebrew riddles in verse during the Middle Ages. Dunash ben Labrat (920-990), credited with transposing Arabic metres into Hebrew, composed a number of riddles, firmly rooted, like folk-riddles, in describing everyday, physical objects. His diwan includes a twenty-line poem comprising ten riddles, one of which runs:

וּמַה שָׁחוׂר וְגַם אָדוׂם יְרוּצוּן
שׁנֵי מַתִים אֲלַיהֶם כֵּעֲבָדִים
בְּהֶאֶחֶד רְפוּאָה גַם חְּעָלֶה
וְהַשֵׁנִי עֲדִי בַּת הַנְּגִידִים

Translation:

What black thing and what red thing run
and have two dead things as servants?
In the one is medicine and remedy;
in the other, the ornamentation of princesses.

Subsequent exponents included Samuel ibn Naghrillah (born 993), the sixth section of whose philosophical verse collection Ben Mishlei (literally 'son of Proverbs', but more idiomatically 'after Proverbs') presents a series of philosophically inclined riddles. The subjects of his riddles generally remained concrete — examples include the moon, pen and ink, a boat or fountain — but he began to introduce riddles on abstract themes such as God, wisdom, joy, and folly, with a didactic purpose.

And he said to me: Is there life in death, without a heart?
I answered: foolishness.
And he continued: Is there death in life, with the body intact?
I answered: poverty.

Frequently, the word representing the solution was integrated into the end-rhyme of the poem, making the solution to the riddle the completion of a verse.

Samuel was followed by Moses ibn Ezra (born c. 1055×60), Judah Halevi (born c. 1075), Abraham ibn Ezra (born 1089×92) and Yehuda Alharizi (born 1165).

Judah is noted as the most prolific Hebrew riddler of his time, with a corpus of at least sixty-seven riddles, some of which survive in his own hand, and even in draft form. These are mostly short, monorhyme compositions on concrete subjects such as everyday artefacts, animals and plants, or a name or word. For example, he wrote:

Evincing the infinite—

the size of your palm—

what it holds is beyond you,

curious, at hand.

(The answer is 'hand-mirror'.) However, his riddles also include a piece as long as 36 verses, to be solved both as 'pomegranate' and 'Granada'; the solution to some remains the subject of research.

Meanwhile, Abraham is noted for maximising the use of riddles as a meditation on knowledge and the divine.

The Andalusian tradition extended to Italy from the twelfth century, beginning with the work of Yerahmiel Bar Shlomo. Immanuel the Roman wrote riddles, as did Israel Onceneyra.

== Post-medieval ==
In Hebrew-speaking Spain and Italy during around 1650-1850, a baroque sub-genre of the literary riddle called ḥiddat hatsurah vehalo‘ez (literally 'riddles of an emblem with foreign-language passages', known in English simply as 'emblem riddles') flourished. The genre was characterised by alluding to words in languages other than Hebrew (lo‘ez) in order to provide clues to the solution. For example, one riddle includes the Hebrew phrase Eh ko nistarti ('I am hidden somewhere here'). The first two of these words sound the same as the Italian/Spanish word eco ('echo'), and 'echo' (Hebrew hed) is indeed the solution to the poem. Each riddle would include an 'emblem' (tsurah) near the opening in the form of an allusive picture, poem, or phrase, or a combination of these, after which the riddle proper would commence. Poems in this genre were occasional, composed in celebration of specific high-society events such as weddings and circumcisions. The topic of the riddle would often reflect the occasion and audience (with solutions such as 'wisdom' for a gathering of scholars, or 'love' at a wedding), and the riddle might make use of information about the people at the gathering in ways which would make little sense to a wider audience.

At the end of the Haggadah, there is also the Echad Mi Yodea, characterised by Joseph Jacobs as 'a curious riddle'.

== See also ==
- Yehuda Ratzaby, 'Halakhic Poetic Riddles of R. Shalem Me'oded', Sefunot: Studies and Sources on the History of the Jewish Communities in the East (שירי-חידה הלכיים לר' שלם מעודד יהודה רצהבי, ספונות: מחקרים ומקורות לתולדות קהילות ישראל במזרח) New Series /סדרה חדשה, כרך א (טז) (תש"ם), pp. 273–286
- Y. Ratzhaby, 'Ahuda Na' ['Let me Utter Riddles'], Yeda-am, 2 (1954), 36-42.
- Dan Pagis, A Secret Sealed: Hebrew Baroque Emblem-Riddles from Italy and Holland (Jerusalem: The Magnes Press, 1986).
- רוזן-מוקד, טובה [Tova Rosen-Moked], “'Testing with Riddles': The Hebrew Riddle of the Middle Ages” [in Hebrew], הספרות [Ha-Sifrut], 30–31 (1980): 168–83
- רוזן-מוקד, טובה (1999–2000). "החידה כמשל - על חידות דיאלוגיות של שמואל הנגיד" [Dialogic Riddles in "Ben Mishle" by Samuel Ha-Nagid]. דפים למחקר בספרות. 12: 7–23. JSTOR 23417452.
