= Hunar-nama =

Persian mathnavī poem

Hunar-nāma ('the book of excellence', also transliterated Honarnāme) is a 487-distich Persian mathnavī poem composed by ‘Uthmān Mukhtārī at Tabas in the period 500-508 (1105-13 CE), when he was at the court of Seljuqs in Kirmān. The poem is dedicated to the ruler of Tabas, Yamīn al-Dowla (a.k.a. Ḥisām ad-Dīn Yamīn ad-Dowla Shams al-Ma‘ālī Abū ’l-Muẓaffar Amīr Ismā‘īl Gīlakī, and can be read as a 'letter of application' demonstrating Mukhtārī's skill as a court poet. It has been characterised as 'perhaps the most interesting of the poems dedicated to Gīlākī'.

== Form ==
The poem is unique among masnavīs for portraying a young poet being tested, not by a more senior poet as in other medieval Persian poems, but by an astrologer. Moreover, is also unique for including a series of riddles (ten in all) on the spiritual, intellectual, and military ideals for a king. These in turn have a distinctive structure: each has ten distichs posing ethical questions, followed by two distichs in which the poet delivers his answers. The riddles in particular serve to showcase Mukhtārī's virtuosity in poetic description. The poem is also among the earliest to have been written in the khafīf metre.

== Contents ==
The poem begins of a cosmological survey, which descends from heaven to earth before culminating in praise of God and his Prophet. The second half of the poem narrates the reverse process: the striving of the poet's persona to proceed from a mundane existence to spiritual perfection. He achieves this by going on a journey and meeting an astrologer, who tests his wisdom with riddles

It was translated into English by A. A. Seyed-Gohrab.

== Sources and influences ==
Though rather different, the Hunar-nāma may have drawn some inspiration from the Rowshanā’ī-namā by Nāṣir-i Khusrow (d. 1075). It may in turn have inspired Sanā’ī's Ḥadīqat al-ḥaqīqa, Seyr al-‘ibād, and Kār-nāma. The testing of the poet's wisdom recalls similar tests of young men's wits in Persian epic and romance texts such as Khosrow ud Redak, Asadī's Garshāsp-nāma, and Firdow's Shāh-nāma.

== Editions and translations ==
- Humā’ī, Jalāl ad-Dīn, Funūn-i balāghat va ṣanā‘at-i adabī (Tehran, 1975) [critical edition]
- Seyed-Gohrab, A. A. (2010). Courtly Riddles: Enigmatic Embellishments in Early Persian Poetry. Leiden: Leiden University Press. pp. 156-99 includes translations of the riddles
