= Al-Ma'muni =

Arabic poet

شارع ابو طالب المأموني; ʿAbū Ṭālib al-Maʾmūnī Street in Jeddah

ʿAbū Ṭālib ʿAbd al-Salām ibn al-Ḥasan al-Maʾmūnī (ابو طالب المأموني; after 953 CE in Baghdad – 993) was an Arab poet, noted for his epigrammatic writing.

== Life ==
Al-Maʾmūnī's name indicates that he was descended from the caliph al-Maʾmūn. Though born in Baghdād, he soon moved to Rayy, where he studied with Ṣāḥib Ibn ʿAbbād; falling out with some of Ibn ʿAbbād's circle, he moved to Nīshāpūr, joining the court of Abu ’l-Ḥusayn al-ʿUtbī and his successor Abū Naṣr in Bukhārā through the patronage of Ibn Sīmjūr, a Sāmānid commander. There he met al-Tha'ālibī, who was later to write a biography and record the lion's share of al-Maʾmūnī's surviving verse. Although al-Tha'ālibī reports that al-Maʾmūnī aspired to win (or regain?) the ʿAbbāsid caliphate, this clearly never transpired, and he died of hydropsy in 383/993.

== Works ==
While he wrote in other forms, al-Maʾmūnī's oeuvre is most noted for its short, ekphrastic epigrams, showing Persian influence and characteristic of the Perso-Arabic literary concept of waṣf ('description') on themes such as buildings, utensils (for example, writing implements, scissors, baskets), fruits, and foods. The following, 'fī al-tannūr' ('on a baking oven') is an example (albeit attested only in one manuscript):

rakīyatun qad sakanat qaʿrahā * li-l-shamsi ukhtun ʿabadathā al-majūs
in lam takun tilka fa-mā bāluhā * taghkhudhu aqmāran wa-tuʿṭī shumūs

Translation:

A spring whose base has been inhabited by a sister of the sun, whom the majūs worship
if that isn't what it is, why should it take in moons and give out suns?

(Here the conceit is that an unbaked piece of bread looks like the moon, and when baked it is like the sun.)

Another example is this five-line verse in three-foot rajaz lines:

ياقوتة ما ضمّها مِخْنقه\\في دُرّة في حقّة محقَّقه
كأنّها وقد غدت مفلَّقه\\مذ نُشرت أثوابها المرقَّقه
\\تِبْر حَوَتْه من لُجَين بُوتَقه

Translation:

A ruby—a necklace did not incorporate her—
in a pearl in a perfectly made casket:
as if, after she had become split
and her fine clothes spread out,
pure gold in a crucible of pure silver.

=== Epigram topics ===
Epigram topics (according to 1983 Beirut edition)
first page	topic (Arabic)	topic (transliterated)	topic (translation)	metre	number (Bürgel translation)	topic (Bürgel)
iv 195	المنارة		lighthouse	ṭawīl		
iv 196	الْكُرْسِيّ	al-kursī	chair	mujtathth	1	Auf den Thronstuhl
iv 196	الْكُرْسِيّ	al-kursī	chair	mutaqārib	2/3	Auf den Thronstuhl
iv 196	طست الشمع	ṭast al-shamʿ	candleholder	kāmil	4	Auf den Kerzenhalter
iv 197	طست الشمع	ṭast al-shamʿ	candleholder	ṭawīl	5	Auf den Kerzenhalter
iv 197	النَّار	al-nar	fire	sarīʿ	23	Auf das Feuer
iv 197	الْحمام	al-ḥammām	bath	ṭawīl	35	Auf das Bad
iv 197	السطل والكرنيب	al-saṭl wa-l-kirnīb	bucket and basin	rajaz	6	Auf den Schöpfeimer und das Waschbecken
iv 198	حجر الْحمام	ḥajar al-ḥammām	stone of the bath	sarīʿ	18	Auf den "Badestein"
iv 198	الليف	al-līf	palm-fibre	rajaz	19	Auf die Palmfasern
iv 198	المنشفة	al-minshafa	towel	munsariḥ	20	Auf das Taschentuch
iv 198	الزنبيل	al-zanbīl	palm-fibre basket	wāfir	7	Auf den Palmfaserkorb
iv 199	كوز أَخْضَر محرق	kūz akhḍar muḥarraq	burnt, green jug	kāmil	8	Auf einen grünen gebrannten Krug
iv 199	الشرابية	al-sharābīya	wine-jug stand (?)	sarīʿ	9	Auf den Weinkrugständer
iv 199	الجليد	al-jalīd	ice	basīṭ	39	Auf das Eis
iv 199	مَاء بجليد	māʾ bi-jalīd	water with ice	rajaz	40	Auf Wasser mit Eis
iv 199	جلاب	kaʾs jullāb	cup of jallab	rajaz	41	Auf einen Becher Rosenwassers
iv 200	جلاب	kaʾs jullāb	cup of jallab	ṭawīl	42	Auf einen Becher Rosenwassers
iv 200	السكنجبين	sakanjabīn	sekanjabin	ṭawīl	43	Auf das Oxymel (Sauerhonig)
iv 200	الفقاعة	al-fuqqāʿa	barley-water (foam-bubble)	munsariḥ	44	Auf den Gerstensaft
iv 200	الفقاعة	al-fuqqāʿa	barley-water (foam-bubble)	rajaz	45	Auf den Gerstensaft
iv 201	الأترج المربى	al-utrujj al-murabbā	citron marmalade	rajaz	46	Auf das Orangengelee
iv 202	الإهليج المربي	al-ihlīlaj al-murabbā	on jellied myrobalans	sarīʿ	47	Auf gelierte Myrobolanen
iv 202	الترنجبين	al-taranjubīn	manna	rajaz	48	Auf das Manna
iv 202	برنية زجاج		glass globes	ṭawīl		
iv 202	برنية زجاج		glass globes	mujtathth		
iv 203	كعاب الغزال فِي برنية زجاج	kiʿāb al-ghazāl fī barniyyat zujāj	gazelle ankles in a glass jug	basīṭ	51	Auf die "Gazellenknõchel" in einer Glasschale
iv 203	كعاب الغزال فِي برنية زجاج	kiʿāb al-ghazāl fī barniyyat zujāj	gazelle ankles in a glass jug	ṭawīl	52	Auf die "Gazellenknõchel" in einer Glasschale
iv 203	كعاب الغزال فِي برنية زجاج	kiʿāb al-ghazāl fī barniyyat zujāj	gazelle ankles in a glass jug	ṭawīl	53	Auf die "Gazellenknõchel" in einer Glasschale
iv 203	بَنَادِق القند الخزائني فِي برنية زجاج	banādiq al-qand al-khazāʾinī fī barniyyat zujāj	? in a glass jug	basīṭ	54	Auf Bolzen von Speicherkandis in einer Glasschale
iv 203	أعمدة القند الخزائن	aʿmidat al-qand alkhazāʾinī	sticks of candied sugar	hazaj	55	Auf Stäbchen von Speicherkandis
iv 204	اللوز الرطب	al-lawz al-raṭb	fresh almonds	ṭawīl	56	Auf die "feuchten" Mandeln
iv 204	اللوز الْيَابِس	al-lawz al-yābis	dried almonds	basīṭ	57	Auf die trockenen Mandeln
iv 204	الْجَوْز الرطب	al-jawz al-raṭb	fresh nuts	kāmil	58	Auf die "feuchten" Nüsse
iv 204	الزَّبِيب الطَّائِفِي	al-zabīb al-ṭāʾifī	raisins of the ṭāʾifī type	munsariḥ	59	Auf die ṭāʾifischen Rosinen
iv 204	[القشمش]	[al-qishmish]	currants or currant-juice	rajaz	60.	Auf die Korinthen bzw. Korinthensaft
iv 205	الْعنَّاب	al-ʿunnāb	jujube	mujtathth	61	Auf die Brustbeeren
iv 205	الباقلاء الْأَخْضَ	al-bāqilāʾ al-akhḍar	green broad beans	rajaz	62	Auf die grünen Saubohnen
iv 205	الباقلاء المنبوت	al-bāqilāʾ al-manbūt	germinating broad beans	sarīʿ	63	Auf die keimenden Saubohnen
iv 205	الْبِطِّيخ	al-biṭṭīkh	melon	ṭawīl	64	Auf die Melone
iv 206	الْبِطِّيخ الْهِنْدِيّ	al-biṭṭīkh al-hindī	Indian melon	ṭawīl	65	Auf die indische Melone
iv 206	الكمثرى	al-kum(m)athrā	pear	wāfir	66	Auf die Birne
iv 206	رمانة	rummāna	pomegranate	sarīʿ	67	Auf einen Granatapfel
iv 206	[الإناء]	[al-ināʾ]	jar	kāmil	68	Auf ein Gefäß
iv 207	الْملح المطيب	al-milḥ al-muṭayyab	spiced salt	sarīʿ	69	Auf das gewürzte Salz
iv 207	خبز الأبازير	al-khubz al-abāzīr	spiced bread	sarīʿ	71	Auf das Gewürzbrot
iv 207	الرقَاق	al-ruqāq	flatbread	sarīʿ		Auf das Fladenbrot
iv 207	الرقَاق	al-ruqāq	flatbread	mutaqārib	72	Auf das Fladenbrot
iv 208	الْجُبْن وَالزَّيْتُون	al-jubn wa-l-zaitūn	white cheese and olives	ṭawīl	73	Auf den Weißkäse und die Oliven
iv 208	البوراني والبطيخ	al-būrānī wa-l-biṭṭīkh	borani and melon	ṭawīl	74	Auf "Būrānī" und Melonen
iv 209	العجة	al-ʿujja	omelette	munsariḥ	75	Auf die Omelette
iv 209	الجوذابة	al-jūdhāba	grain pudding baked under dripping meat	rajaz	76	Auf das Reisfleisch
iv 209	الشواء السوقي	al-shiwāʾ al-sūqī	grill in the market	ṭawīl	77	Auf das "Basargebratene"
iv 209	سَمَكَة مشوية	samaka mashwiyya	grilled fish	sarīʿ	78	Auf einen gebratenen Fisch
iv 209	سَمَكَة مشوية	samaka mashwiyya	grilled fish	sarīʿ	79	Auf einen gebratenen Fisch
iv 210	السفود	al-saffūd	skewers	ṭawīl	80	Auf den Bratspieß
iv 210	الهريسة	al-harīsa	harissa	munsariḥ	81	Auf die Harīsa (Fleisch und Weizengrütze)
iv 210	مَاء الْخَرْدَل	māʾ al-khardal	mustard water	khafīf	82	Auf den Senf
iv 210	الْبيض المفلق	al-baiḍ al-mufallaq	broken eggs (but the correct subject is a mixed dish)	rajaz	83	Auf ein Mischgericht
iv 211	الْبيض المفلق	al-baiḍ al-mufallaq	broken eggs	rajaz	84	Auf "gespaltene" Eier
iv 211	أَقْرَاص السّحُور	aqrāṣ al-saḥūr	loaves at suhur	rajaz	85	Auf die Fladen des Fastenbrotes
iv 211	اللوزينج الْيَابِس	a-lawzīna al-yābisj	dry nougat	ṭawīl	86	Auf den "trockenen" Nougat
iv 211	اللوزينج الْفَارِسِ	a-lawzīna al-fārisī	Persian nougat	ṭawīl	87	Auf den persischen Nougat
iv 211	الخبيص	al-khabīṣ	khabees	sarīʿ	88	Auf al-Khabiṣ (eine Dattelspeise)
iv 212	الفالوزج الْمَعْقُود	al-fālūzaj al-maʿqūd	sweet based on flour, water and honey	sarīʿ	89	Auf das gelierte Fālūzaj (eine Mandelspeise)
iv 212	مشاش الْخَلِيفَة	mushāsh al-khalīfa	the caliphate	ṭawīl	90	Auf das "Kalifenmark"
iv 212	أَصَابِع زَيْنَب	aṣābiʿ Zainab	Zaynab's finger	ṭawīl	91	Auf die "Finger der Zainab"
iv 212	أَصَابِع زَيْنَب	aṣābiʿ Zainab	Zaynab's finger	ṭawīl	92	Auf die "Finger der Zainab"
iv 212	عدَّة من المطعومات	?	?	khafīf	93	Auf die Diät
iv 213	الْمَدِينَة	al-mudya	slaughter-knife	sarīʿ	94	Auf das Schlachtmesser
iv 213	مجمع الأشنان بِمَا فِيهِ من المحلب والخلال	majmaʿ al-ushnān bi-mā fīhi min al-maḥlab wa-l-klilāl	On the pot of the potash with its ingredients sour cherry and "sweet herbs"	mujtathth	95	Auf das Sammelgefäß der Pottasche mit ihren Ingredienzien Weichselkirsche und "süßen Kräutern". Oder: Auf das Sammelgefäß der Pottasche samt dem, was dazu gehört an [Zahnstochern aus] Weichselkirsche und Speiseresten (d. h., was zwischen den Zähnen hængenbleibt).
iv 214	طين الْأكل		edible clay	sarīʿ		
iv 214	الْجَمْر والمدخنة	al-jamr wa-l-midkhana	embers in chimney	mutaqārib	24	Auf die Glut und den Rauchfang
iv 214	جمر خبا بعد اشتعاله	jamrin khabā baʿda shtiʿālihi	embers extinguished after burning	khafīf	25	Auf Glut, die verlöschte, nachdem sie aufgeflammt
iv 214	الْبرد	al-barad	hail	ṭawīl	26	Auf den Hagel
iv 214	التدرج	al-tadruj	pheasant	khafīf	97	Auf den Fasan
iv 215	المحبرة	al-miḥbara	inkwell	rajaz	13	Auf das Tintenfaß
iv 215	المقلمة والأقلام	al-miqlama wa-l-aqlām	pens and pen-box	ṭawīl	14	Auf das Federkästchen und die Federn
iv 215	السكين المذنب	al-sikkīn al-mudhannab	pen-knife	wāfir	15	Auf das Federmesser
iv 216	المقط	al-miqaṭṭ	cutter	ṭawīl	16	Auf den "Spitzer"
iv 216	المحراك وَهُوَ الملتاق	al-miḥrāk wa-huwa al-milyāq	poker	rajaz	17	Auf den "Schürer"
iv 216	الاصطرلاب	al-asṭurlāb	astrolabe	khafīf	27	Auf das Astrolab
iv 216	الاصطرلاب	al-asṭurlāb	astrolabe	sarīʿ	28	Auf das Astrolab
iv 216	المقراض	al-miqrāḍ	scissors	rajaz	10	Auf die Schere
iv 217	مشطي عاج وآبنوس	mushṭai ʿāj wa-ābunūs	two combs, one of ivory and one of ebony	basīṭ	21	Auf zwei Kämme, einen aus Elfenbein und einen aus Abenholz
iv 217	المنقاش	al-minqāsh	chisel	sarīʿ	22	Auf den "Meißel"
iv 217	الزربطانة	al-zarbaṭāna	blowpipe	ṭawīl	29	Auf das Blasrohr
iv 217	القفص	al-qafaṣ	cage	hajaz	30	Auf den Käfig
iv 218	قَارُورَة المَاء	qārūrat al-māʾ	flask of water	rajaz	31	Auf die "Wasserflasche"
iv 218	اللبد	al-libd	wool mat	mutaqārib	11	Auf die Wollmatte
iv 218	قضيب الفول	qaḍīb al-fūl	uncertain: literally 'bean-pole'	munsariḥ	32	(?) Wörtlich "Bohnenrohr"

Epigrams included by Bürgel but not in the Beirut edition:

- 12. mā amara b-kitābatihi ʿalā khiwān / Was er auf ein Tablett zu schreiben befahl
- 33. fī al-turs / Auf den Schild
- 34. al-manāra / Auf das Minarett
- 36. mā amara bi-kitābatihi ʿalā fināʾi dār / Was er auf dem Vorhof eines Palastes als Inschrift anbringen ließ
- 37. mā amara bi-kitābatihi ʿalā fināʾi dār / Was er auf dem Vorhof eines Palastes als Inschrift anbringen ließ
- 49. al-ruṭab al-muʿassal fī barniyyat zujāj / Auf Datteln in Honig in einer Glasschale
- 50. al-ruṭab al-muʿassal fī barniyyat zujāj / Auf Datteln in Honig in einer Glasschale
- 93 al-muzawwara / Auf die Diät

=== Style ===
Al-Maʾmūnī's style is a good example of the general tendencies of Arabic poetry of the 4th/10th centuries, which, like the New Persian poetry that was emerging at the same time, tended towards florid and sophisticated forms resembling later European mannerism; no verse was complete without incorporating some conceit (Persian nukte). Thus al-Maʾmūnī uses ostentatiously artful language and unusual words, sometimes creating a purposefully comical contrast between the banality of the content and the pathos of the expression. In Bürgel's estimation, al-Maʾmūnī's language is sometimes rather strained, as in epigram 45 (in Bürgel's numbering, on barley-water), but at other times manages to sound both natural and fresh, as in epigram 7 (on a palm-fibre basket). Though not much inclined to use hyperbole or the device of repeating the same word in different meaning, al-Maʾmūnī is fond of word-play and sound-play, making extensive use of assonance and alliteration. He often deploys antithesis, ranging from simple opposites such as standing and sitting (e.g. poems 1, 2, 3, 94), black and white (e.g. 73), or gold and silver (76, 78, 83, 84) to complex forms (and, in 11 and 18, joking pseudo-antitheses).

Metaphor is central to al-Maʾmūnī's epigrams, which often have a riddlic quality: while in some poems, the subject is named explicitly at the outset, others start with the metaphor, challenging the audience to guess the subject matter before being explicit. While all his descriptions are short and pointed and characterised by fantastical metaphors, each poem almost always contains one or more lines that make a literal statement about the subject, for example that the throne has iron posts and a leather cover (epigram 1), that the bucket is made in Damascus and that its handle creaks (6), or that there are brown and white feathers in the pen box (14).

Personification of inanimate objects is a key technique, sometimes achieved using the terms dhū/dhāt ('owner'), and ibn/ibna ('son/daughter'). Al-Maʾmūnī values harmonious choices of metaphors in his epigrams, for example using only tree-based metaphors in poem 4, and uses a rich array of linguistic techniques to express his comparisons: the usual particles ka kaʾanna, kaʾannamā, mithl and li; verbs from the roots sh-b-h (form IV) and ḥ-k-y (forms I and III); first-person verbs reflecting his personal perspective such as khaltu, ḥasibtu, raʾaitu, taʾammaltu; and direct "A = B" juxtaposition of his comparisons without particles. Al-Maʾmūnī's favoured form of metonymy is synecdoche, especially via adjectives, which also contributes to the riddlic character of the verse. He makes extensive use of the technique that the Persian critic of Arabic literature al-Jurjānī called tafṣīl ('going into details'), whereby a natural unity is dissolved into a fantastic multiplicity: for example, epigram 64, on the melon, says that "لَهَا حلَّة من جلّنار وسوسن * مغمَّدة بالآس غِبَّ غمام" ('she has a garment made of pomegranate flowers and lilies, covered with myrtles after rain'). Much more rarely, he uses the opposite device of presenting a multiplicity as a whole (as in epigram 73, on white cheese and olives). Like riddles, al-Maʾmūnī's epigrams frequently deploy comparison through subtraction: thus the candle-holder (epigram 4) is "وحديقةٍتهتزُّ فيها دَوْحَةٌ * لم يُنْمِها تُرَبٌ وﻻ أمطار" ('like a garden in which a large tree trembles which neither earth nor rain enabled to grow').

== Primary sources ==
The main source for al-Maʾmūnī and his work is the Kitāb Yatīmat al-dahr fī mahāsin ahl al-ʿasṛ by Abū Manṣūr al-Thaʿālibī (who had met al-Maʾmūnī and had access to at least some of his verse in manuscript):

- ʿAbd al-Malik ibn Muḥammad Thaʿālibī, Yatīmat al-dahr fī shuʿarāʼ ahl al-ʿaṣr (يتيمة الدهر في شعراء أهلالعصر), 4 vols (Damascus: [al-Maṭbaʿah al-Ḥifnīyah] دمشق : المطبعة الحفنية, 1302 AH [1885 CE]), vol. 1, vol. 2, vol. 3, vol. 4: iv, 84-112 [part 4, chapter 3].
- Muḥammad Muḥyī al-Dīn ‘Abd al-Ḥamīd محمد محي الدين عبدالحميد (ed.), يتيمة الدهر في في محاسن أهلالعصر, 4 vols (Cairo 1956), vol. 1, vol. 3, vol. 4, iv, 149–79.
- ʻAbd al-Malik ibn Muḥammad Thaʻālibī, Yatīmat al-dahr fī maḥāsin ahl al-ʻaṣr maʻ al-tatimma wa-l-fahāris (يتيمة الدهر في شعراء أهل العصر مع التتمة والفهارس), ed. by Mufīd Muḥammad Qumayḥah, 6 vols (Bayrūt: Dār al-Kutub al-ʻIlmīyah (دار الكتب العلمية), 1983), vols 1-4 (index vol. 6). Machine-readable text.

Some verses appear elsewhere, including the Nihāyat al-arab by al-Nuwayri and the Asrār al-balāgha by al-Jurjānī.

== Other editions and translations ==
- Johann Christoph Bürgel, Die ekphrastischen Epigramme des Abū Ṭālib al-Maʾmūnī: Literaturkundliche Studie über einen arabischen Conceptisten, Nachrichten der Akademie der Wissenschaften in Göttingen, Philologisch-Historische Klasse, 1965/14 (Göttingen: Vandenhoeck & Ruprecht, 1965).
- al-Ma'mūnī's poetry at Poetsgate
- Machine-readable text of al-Tha'ālibī's account
