= Tarjumān al-Ashwāq =

Book by Ibn Arabi

Interpreter of Desires (Arabic: ترجمان الأشواق, romanized: Tarjumān al-Ashwāq) is a collection of 61 self-standing nasībs by the Andalusian Sufi mystic Muḥyī al-Dīn Ibn al-ʿArabī (1165–1240).

== Editions and translations ==
=== Arabic ===
- Ibn al-ʿArabī, Dhakhāʾir al-Aʿlāq: Sharḥ. Turjumān al-Ashwāq, ed. Muḥ ammad Abd al-Raḥ mān al-Kurdī (Cairo, 1968) [includes both poems and Ibn al-ʿArabī's commentary].
- Ibn al-ʿArabī, Turjumān al-Ashwāq (Beirut: Dār Ṣādir, 1966) [includes both poems and Ibn al-ʿArabī's commentary].

=== English ===
- Reynold A. Nicholson (1911). The Tarjumán al-Ashwáq: A Collection of Mystical Odes . Oriental Translation Series, New Series. Vol. XX. London: Royal Asiatic Society – via Wikisource.
- Sells, Michael, The Translator of Desires: Poems (Princeton University Press, 2021).
- Sells, Michael, 'Return to the Flash Rock Plain of Thahmad: Two Nasībs by Ibn al-ʿArabī', Journal of Arabic Literature, 39 (2008), 3–13 (p. 4); DOI: 10.1163/157006408X310825 [translates poems 22 and 26].
- Sells, M., ‘ “You’d Have Seen What Melts the Mind”: Ibn al-ʿArabī's Poem #20 from the Turjumān al-Ashwāq’, in Jonathan P. Decter and Michael Rand, eds., Studies in Arabic and Hebrew Letters in Honor of Raymond P. Scheindlin (Gorgias Press, 2007).
- Sells, Michael, Stations of Desire: Love Elegies from Ibn al-ʿArabī and New Poems (Jerusalem: Ibis Editions, 2001) [translates 24 of the poems into English].
- Sells, Michael, 'Ibn 'Arabi's "Gentle Now, Doves of the Thornberry and Moringa Thicket" (ālā yā hamāmāti l-arākati wa l-bāni)', The Journal of the Muhyiddin Ibn 'Arabi Society, 10 (1991), http://www.ibnarabisociety.org/articles/poemtarjuman11.html [translates poem 11].

=== Romance ===
- Maurice Gloton (trans.), L’Interprète des Désires, Turjumān al-Ashwāq, Traduit de l’arabe (Paris: Albin Michel, 1997) [complete French translation of both the poems and their author's commentary upon them].
- Vincente Cantorino (trans)., Casidas de amor profano y místico: Ibn Zaydun e Ibn ʿArabi (Mexico City: Porrua, 1988) [Spanish translation].
- Ibn Arabi, El Intérprete de los Deseos (Tarŷumān al-Ašwāq), trans. by Carlos Varona Narvión (Murcia: Editora Regional de Murcia, Colección Ibn Arabi, 2002) [Spanish translation].
