= Gazelle ankles =

Traditional Maghrebi cookie

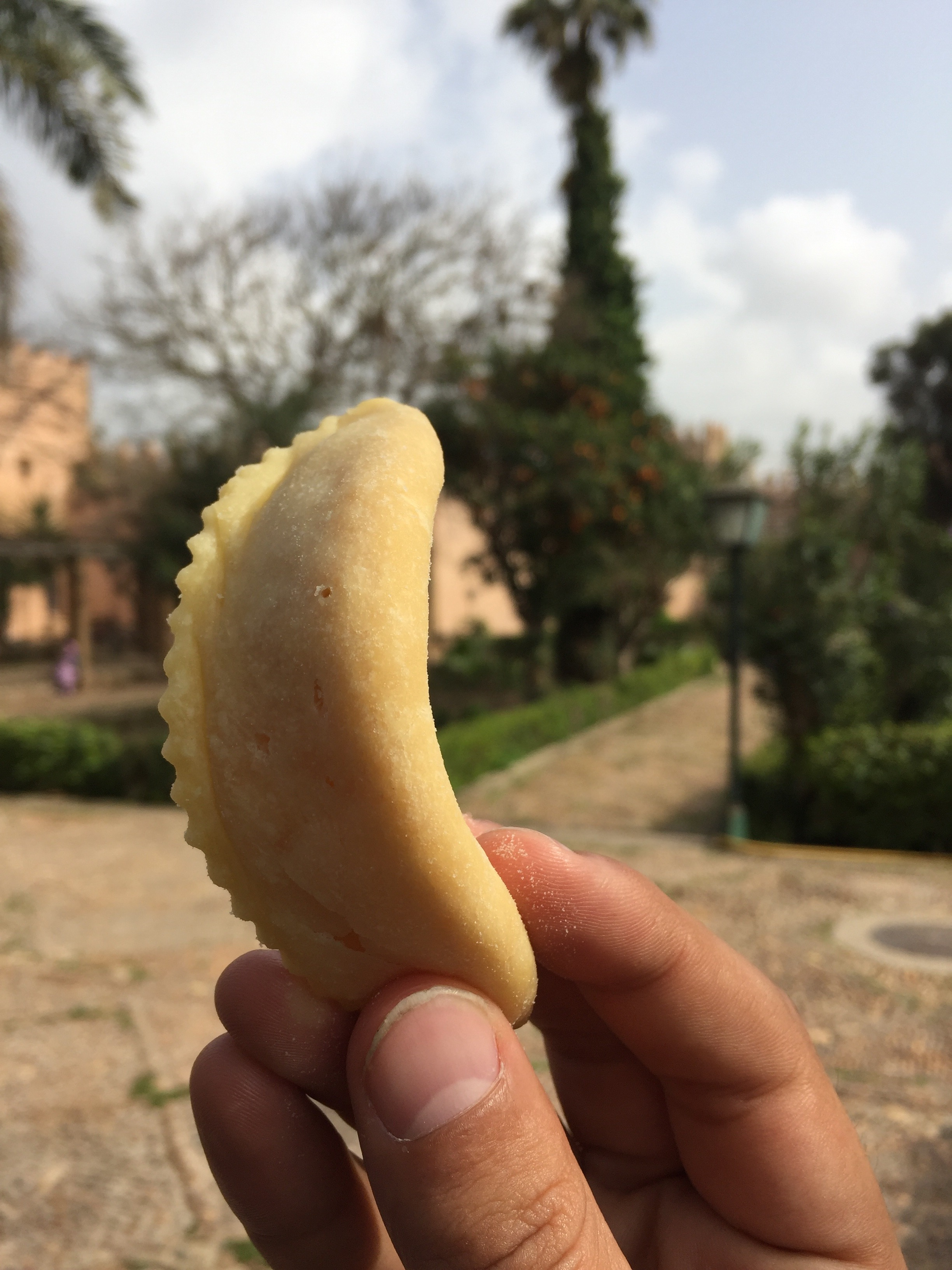
- A gazelle ankle cookie .
- Type: cookie
- Course: dessert
- Place of origin: Maghreb
- Main ingredients: almond paste
- Ingredients generally used: flour, sugar, butter, orange blossom water

Gazelle ankles (Arabic: كعب الغزال; French: cornes de gazelle, lit. 'gazelle horns'), also known as kaab el-ghazal, are a traditional cookie of the Maghreb. They are crescent-shaped cookies made of flour-based dough filled with almond paste aromatized with orange blossom water.

== History ==
"Gazelle ankles" are mentioned in a 13th-century book by Ibn Razīn al-Tujībī, the 13th century version was shaped into rolls, the dough was made using olive oil, flour, hot water, and salt, the stuffing used almonds and sugar.

== Ingredients ==
The essential ingredients in gazelle ankles:

- almonds
- orange blossom water
- flour
- sugar
- butter
- cinnamon

Different variations of the dessert exist, some versions may use date palm paste (ajwa), and are shaped into a roll of dough, which is then cut into pieces, resulting in a spiral shape.

Ground almonds are also often incorporated into the dough.

== Popularity ==
The dessert is popular in the Maghreb region, most popular during the month of Ramadan and Eid al-Fitr.

A version of gazelle ankles called cornes de gazelles can be found in France.

== Gallery ==
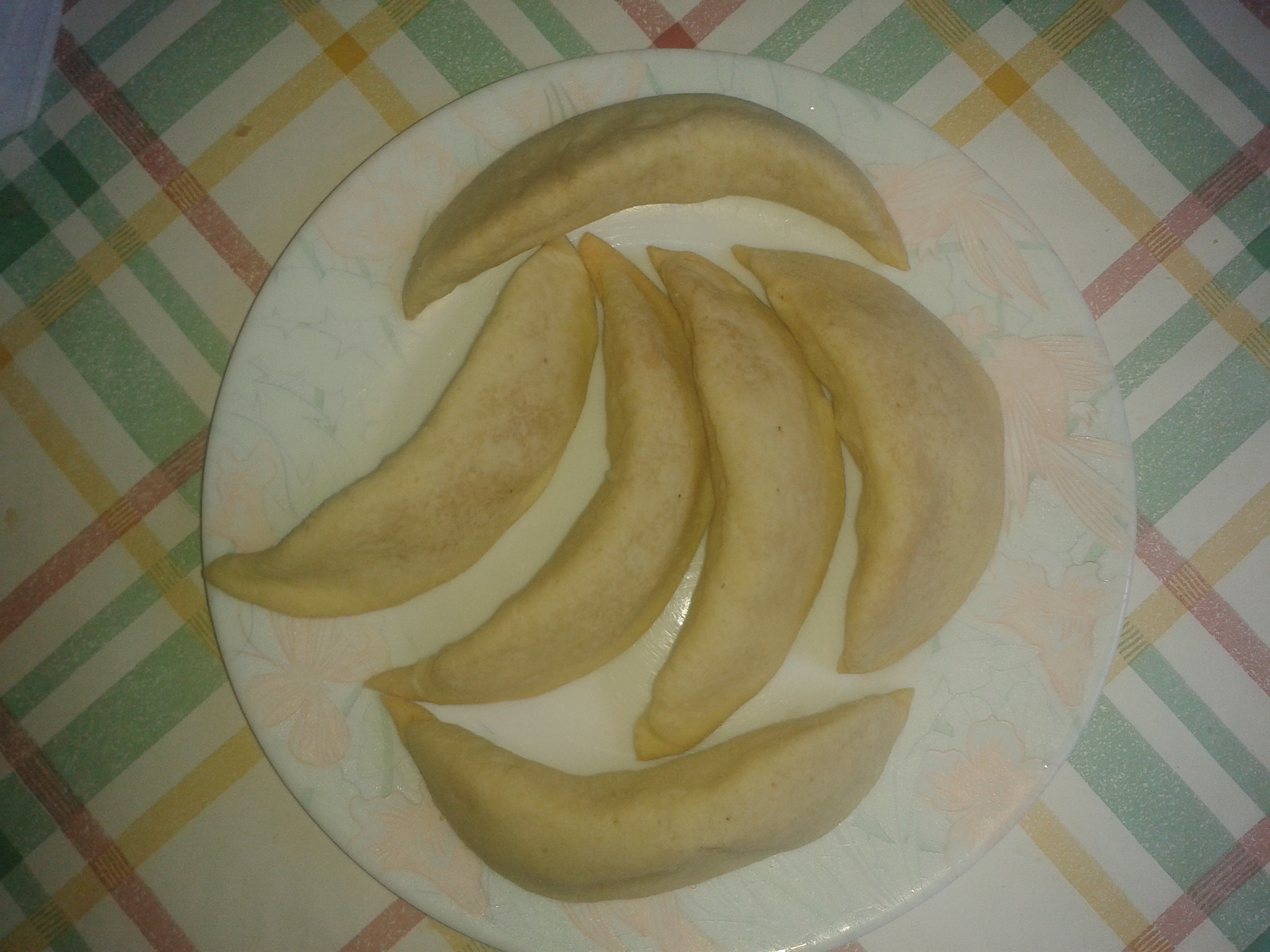

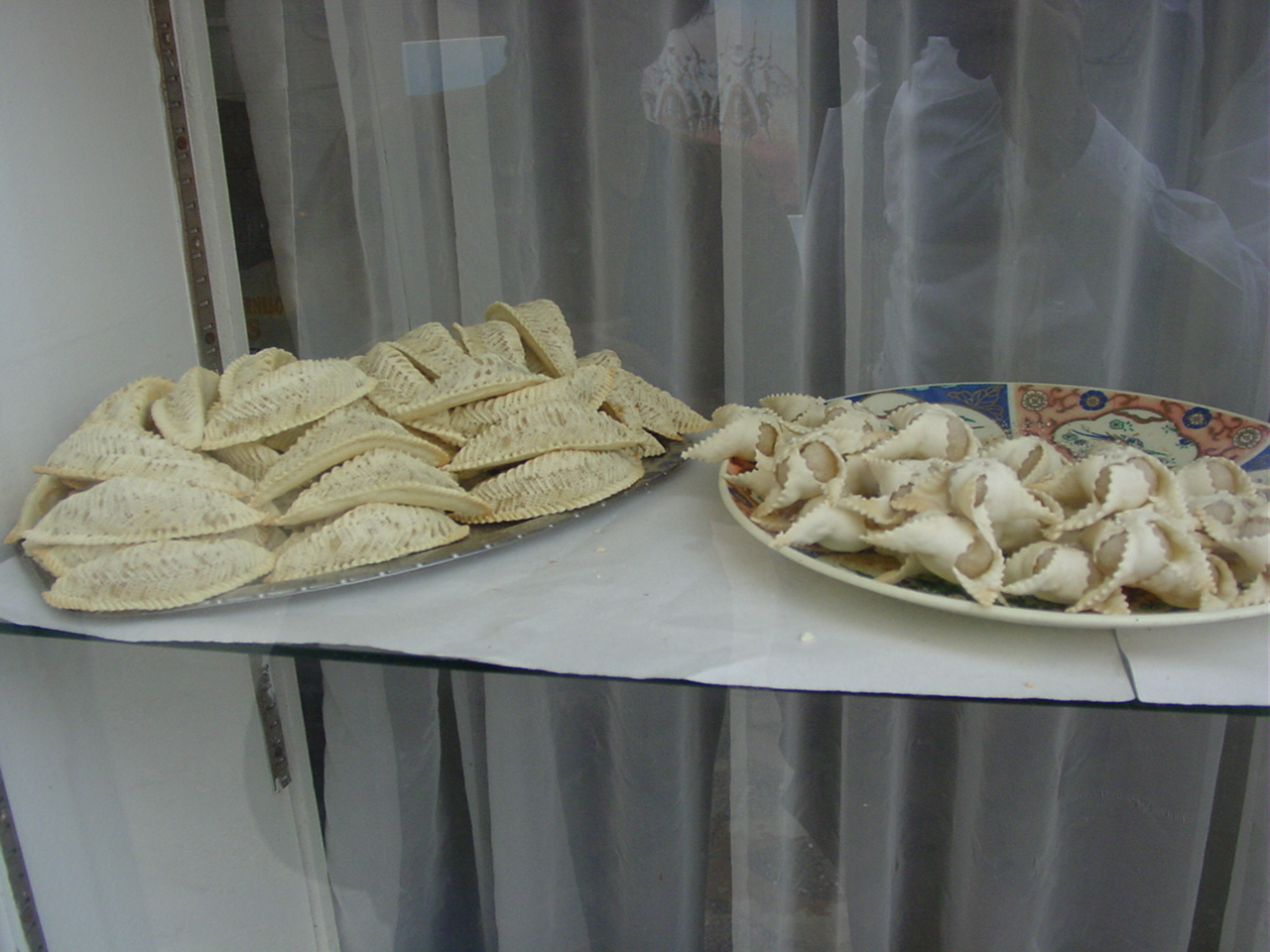

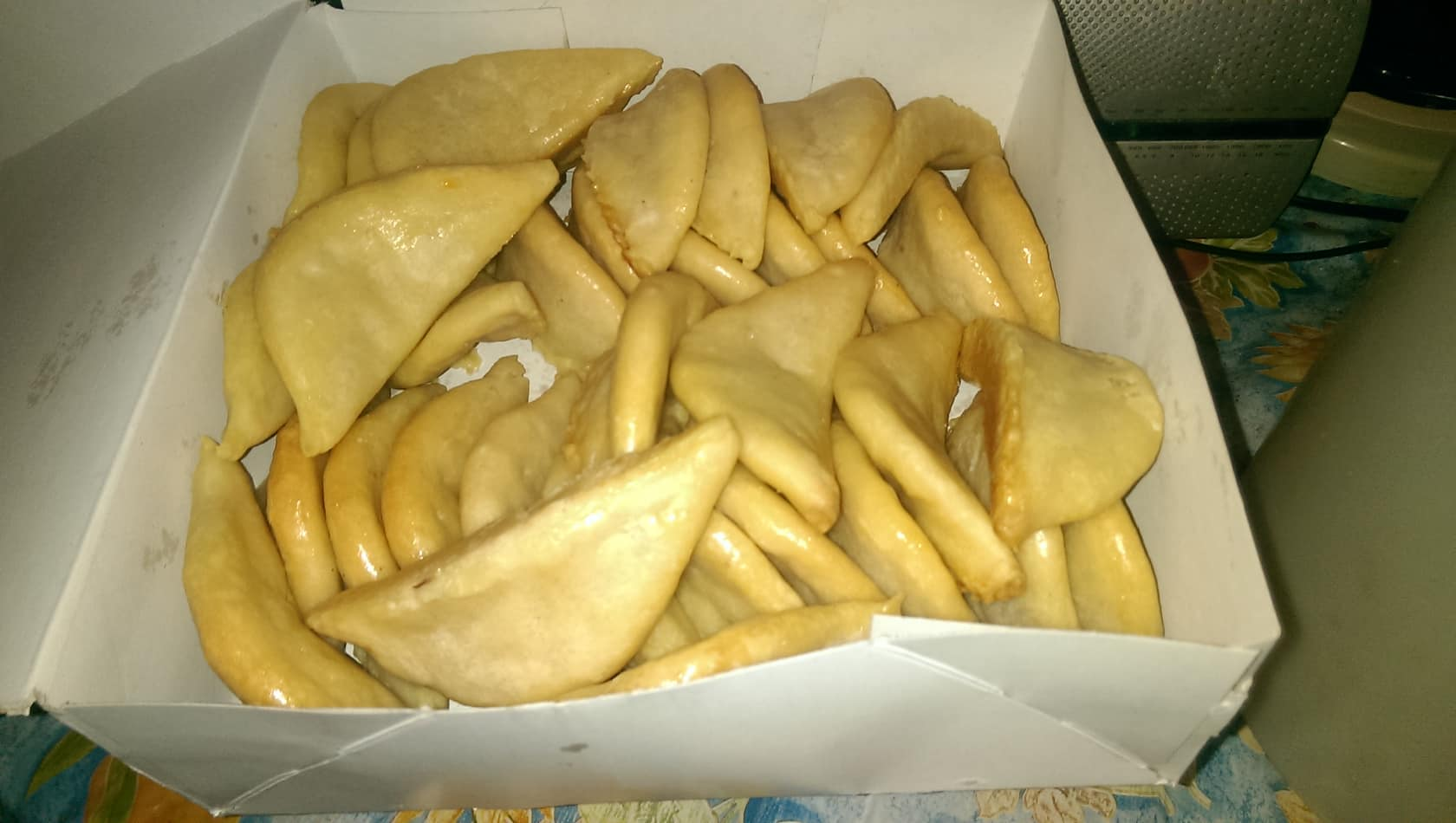

== See also ==
- Half-moon cookie (Philippines)
