= Dhu ar-Rumma =

Abū l-Ḥārith Ghaylān b. ʿUqba, generally known as Dhū al-Rumma ('the one with the frayed cord', possibly referring to a cord amulet; c. 696 – c. 735) was a Bedouin poet and a rāwī of al-Rāʿī al-Numayrī (died c. 715). In the assessment of Nefeli Papoutsakis, 'he stands at the end of a long poetic tradition which, for the most part, expressed the ethos and intellectual preoccupations of the pre-Islamic tribal society of Bedouin Arabs—a fact reflected in the saying of Abū 'Amr b. al-'Alā' that "poetry was closed with Dū r-Rumma" '.

== Life ==
Little reliable information about Dhu ar-Rumma's life is available, but various later sources suggest the following: his mother was called Ẓabya and of the Asad tribe. He himself belonged to the ʿAdī tribe, which was part of the Ribāb confederation, and therefore probably lived in Al-Yamāma and its vicinity. He had three brothers, who also composed poetry: Hishām, Masʿūd, and Jirfās. He seems to have spent part of his life in the cities of Iraq, notably Basra and Kufa, where it seems he spent time with such poets as al-Farazdaq (d. c. 728 CE), Jarīr ibn 'Atiya (d. 728×29 CE), Ruʾba (d. 762 CE), and al-Kumayt (d. 743 CE), and the scholars Abū ʿAmr b. al-ʿAlāʾ (c. 770×72 CE), ʿĪsā b. ʿUmar al-Thaqafī (d. 766 CE), and Ḥammād al-Rāwiya (d. 772×73 CE). He may have been a professional poet. He fell in love with and later married a woman called Mayya, from the Banū Minqar (Tamīm), but his odes also celebrate one Ḥarqā', of the 'Āmir b. Ṣa'ṣa'a.

== Work ==
Ar-Rumma's extensive diwan was widely studied, attracting commentaries from Abū Naṣr Aḥmad ibn Ḥātim al-Bāhilī (d. 846 CE) and (building on al-Bāhilī's) Abū al-ʿAbbās Thaʿlab (d. 904 CE). Its themes and forms included love poetry (in the nasīb and ghazal forms), self-praise (fakhr) about himself and his tribe, eulogy, invective, and riddles (among them the noted Uḥjiyyat al-ʿArab). His poetry is particularly noted for its detailed descriptions of animals.

In the assessment of Nefeli Papoutsakis,

Contemporary views of his poetry were generally negative: he is said to have been incompetent in satire and eulogy (al-Jumaḥī, 551; al-Balādhurī, 10:238; al-Iṣfahānī 18:31), an unjustified criticism, due to the prevalence of travel fakhr in his poetry. He is, nevertheless, regarded as the best poet, in Islamic times, at drawing comparisons (al-Jumaḥī, 549; al-Iṣfahānī, 18:9). Despite all the reported criticisms, his poetry never ceased to be studied and was often quoted in lexicographical and grammatical works, as well as in adab literature, which speaks for its high artistic quality and popularity. Many prominent figures in Arabic letters—such as the poets al-Ṣanawbarī (d. c.334/945) and al-Maʿarrī (d. 449/1058), who wrote commentaries on his work, and literati, including the caliph Hārūn al-Rashīd (r. 170–93/786–809)—admired his talent. Dhū l-Rumma’s poetry represents a mature phase in the development of the Bedouin poetic tradition but also marks the end of its supremacy. This is succinctly expressed in Abū ʿAmr b. al-ʿAlāʾ’s saying that “poetry came to an end with Dhū l-Rumma” (al-Iṣfahānī, 18:9).

=== Lists of poems and manuscript ===
first hemistich	number in Abū Ṣāliḥ	number in Macartney	metre
ما بال عينك منها الماء ينسكب	1	1	basīṭ
خليلي عوجا عوجة ناقتيكما	2	64	ṭawīl
ألا حي دارا قد أبان محيلها	3	69	ṭawīl
يا دار مية بالخلصاء فالجرد	4	20	basīṭ
خليلي عوجا اليوم حتى تسلما	5	79	ṭawīl
تصابيت في أطلال مية بعد ما	6	40	ṭawīl
أقول لنفسي واقفا عند مشرف	7	53	ṭawīl
ما هاج عينيك من الأطلال	8	63	rajaz
قفا نحي العرصات الهمدا	9	14	rajaz
ذكرت فاهتاج السقام المضمر	10	28	rajaz
قلت لنفسي شبه التفنيد	11		
أ- هل تعرف المنزل بالوحيد	11	22	rajaz
أأن ترسمت من خرقاء منزلة	12		
أدارا بحزوى هجت للعين عبرة	13	52	ṭawīl
دنا البين من مي فردت جمالها	14	68	ṭawīl
ألا يا اسلمي يا دار مي على البلى	15	29	ṭawīl
خليلي لا رسم بوهبين مخبر	16	30	ṭawīl
أقول لأطلاح برى هطلانها	17	54	ṭawīl
ألا حي أطلالا كحاشية البرد	18	19	ṭawīl
أحادرة دموعك دار مي	19	76	wāfir
كأن ديار الحي بالزرق خلقة	20	18	ṭawīl
ألا حي ربع الدار قفرا جنوبها	21	8	ṭawīl
بكيت وما يبكيك من رسم منزل	22	43	ṭawīl
أمن دمنة بين القلات وشارع	23	46	ṭawīl
خليلي عوجا الناعجات فسلما	24		
خليلي عوجا عوجة ناقتيكما	25	48	ṭawīl
وقفت على ربع لمية ناقتي	26	5	ṭawīl
أمن دمنة جرت بها ذيلها الصبا	27	11	ṭawīl
أخرقاء للبين استقلت حمولها	28	49	rajaz
أتعرف أطلالا بوهبين فالحضر	29	35	ṭawīl
يا حاديي بنت فضاض أما لكما	30	9	basīṭ
مررنا على دار لمية مرة	31	82	ṭawīl
لمية أطلال بحزوى دواثر	32	32	ṭawīl
ألا حي عند الزرق دار مقام	33	78	ṭawīl
أمن دمنة بالجو جو جلاجل	34	47	ṭawīl
ألا أيها الرسم الذي غير البلى	35	16	ṭawīl
ألم تسأل اليوم الرسوم الدوارس	36	41	ṭawīl
يا دار مية بالخلصاء غيرها	37	25	basīṭ
ألا أيهذا المنزل الدارس اسلم	38	81	ṭawīl
أمنزلتي مي سلام عليكما	39	10	ṭawīl
ألا لا أرى كالدار بالزرق موقفا	40	23	ṭawīl
عفا الدحل من مي فمحت منازله	41	62	ṭawīl
أمنزلتي مي سلام عليكما	42	45	ṭawīl
ألا حي بالزرق الرسوم الخواليا	43	87	ṭawīl
خليلي عوجا حييا رسم دمنة	44	83	ṭawīl
خليلي عوجا من صدور الرواحل	45	66	ṭawīl
يا دار مية لم يترك لها علما	46	17	basīṭ
نبت عيناك عن طلل بحزوى	47	27	wāfir
ألا حي المنازل بالسلام	48	77	wāfir
لقد جشأت نفسي عشية مشرف	49	24	ṭawīl
قف العنس في أطلال مية فاسأل	50	67	ṭawīl
أراح فريق جيرتك الجمالا	51	57	wāfir
أتتنا من نداك مبشرات	52	59	wāfir
أمن أجل دار بالرمادة قد مضى	53	50	ṭawīl
أتعرف الدار تعفت أبدا	54	13	rajaz
وجدنا أبا بكر به تقرع العلا	55	33	ṭawīl
خليلي ما بي من عزاء على الهوى	56	2	ṭawīl
زرق العيون إذا جاورتهم سرقوا	57	3	basīṭ
أمنكر أنت ربع الدار عن عفر	58	4	basīṭ
أتعرف دار الحي بادت رسومها	59	84	ṭawīl
لقد ظعنت مي فهاتيك دارها	60	73	ṭawīl
خليلي عوجا ساعة ثم سلما	61	71	ṭawīl
عليكن يا أطلال مي بشارع	62	72	ṭawīl
لعمري وما عمري علي بهين	63	80	ṭawīl
أللربع ظلت عينك الماء تهمل	64	61	ṭawīl
عفا الزرق من أطلال مية فالدحل	65	60	ṭawīl
أللأربع الدهم اللواتي كأنها	66	51	ṭawīl
تتمة الديوان			
القسم الأول شرح أبي نصر			
أشاقتك أخلاق الرسول الدواثر	67	39	ṭawīl
أما استحلبت عينيك إلا محلة	68	55	ṭawīl
على الأرض- والرحمن- يا مي غبرة	69		
لعمرك للغضبان يوم لقيته	70		
القسم الثاني شرح أبي نصر وغيره			
تغير بعدي من أميمة شارع	71	15	ṭawīl
فلو كان عمران ابن موسى أتمها	72	26	ṭawīl
لقد حكمت يوم القصيبة بيننا	73	31	ṭawīl
فإن تقتلوني بالأمير فإنني	74	36	ṭawīl
إني إذا ما عجز الوطواط	75	44	rajaz
هيماء خرقاء وخرق أهيم	76	74	rajaz
لحا الله أنانا عن الضيف بالقرى	77		
القسم الثالث شرح أبي العباس الأحول			
لقد خفق النسران والنجم نازل	78	6	ṭawīl
يا أيها ذيا الصدى النبوح	79	12	rajaz
أصهب يمشي مشية الأمير	80	37	rajaz
قلت لنفسي حين فاضت أدمعي	81		
وجارية ليست من الإنس تشتهى	82	85	ṭawīl
تعرفت أطلالا فهاجت لك الهوى	83	86	ṭawīl
القسم الرابع لشارح مجهول			
خليلي اسألا الطلل المحيلا	84	58	wāfir
فهلا قتلتم ثأركم مثل قتلنا	85	65	ṭawīl
ألا يا دار مية بالوحيد	86	21	wāfir
أأن ترسمت من خرقاء منزلة	87	38	basīṭ
لمن طلل عاف بوهبين راوحت	88	34	ṭawīl
وبيض رفعنا بالضحى عن متونها	89	42	ṭawīl
أأحلف لا أنسى وإن شطت النوى	90	56	ṭawīl
ملحق الديوان			
خليلي عوجا بارك الله فيكما		7	ṭawīl
أخرقاء للبين استقلت حمولها		70	ṭawīl
أعن ترسمت من خرقاء منزلة		75	basīṭ

The following list of manuscripts is based on Macartney's edition.

Macartney’s siglum	Shelfmark	Date and scribe	Notes (numbering of odes is Macartney’s)
D	India Office 1240		contains scholia related to C’s
C	Cairo, Khedivial Library, Adab 562		contains scholia attributed in the MS to Abu’l FatH al-‘Ā’iDī
L	Leiden, Leiden University Library, 2028	1880	38 of the longer poems
Lugd.	Leiden, Cod. Lugd. 287		61 and first 20 lines of 81
L*	Lugd. 2029		
C(I)			
C*			
BM	London, British Library, MS Add. 7573	740 AH (1339 CE), MuHammad ibn ‘Alī ibn Madhkūr	Concise scholia, related to C’s, and limited vocalisation. Title page says the recension was by al-Asma‘ī.
BM(1)	London, British Library, MS Add. 7530		contain texts and scholia for odes 1, 52, 67, 75
BM(2)	London, British Library, Or. 415		full vocalisation and exceptionally extensive glosses, probably by al-Sikkīt
Const	Istanbul, Faizīyyah Mosque, 1677		full and accurate vocalisation and scholia
Ambr	Milan, Ambrosian Library		formerly in San‘ā’

== Editions and translations ==
- ʿAbd al-Qaddūs Abū Ṣāliḥ (بد القدوس أبو صالح) (ed.), Dīwān Dhī l-Rumma. Sharḥ Abī Naṣr al-Bāhilī, riwāyat Thaʿlab (ديوان ذي الرمة شرح أبي نصر الباهلي رواية ثعلب). Based on the editor's Ph.D. thesis.
  - 1st edn, 3 vols (Beirut 1972), vol. 1, vol. 2, vol. 3.
  - 2nd edn, 3 vols (Beirut 1982), archive.org scan, machine-readable text.
  - 3rd edn, 3 vols (Beirut 1994).
- Muṭī al-Babbīlī (ed.), Diwān Dhū l-Rummah (Damascus, 1964).
- Carlile Henry Hayes Macartney (ed.), The Dîwân of Ghailân Ibn ʿUqbah known as Dhu ’r-Rummah (Cambridge: Cambridge University Press, 1919).
- Michael Sells, Desert tracings. Six classic Arabian odes by ʿAlqama, Shánfara, Labíd, ʿAntara, Al-Aʿsha, and Dhu al-Rúmma (Middletown CT 1989), pp. 67–76 (first published as 'Dhũ al-Rumma's "To the Two Abodes of Mayya..."', Al-'Arabiyya, 15.1/2 (Spring and Autumn 1982), 52-65).
- Selections from the Diwan of Gailan ibn ʻUqba Dhuʹl Rumma, trans. by Arthur Wormhoudt ([Oskaloosa, Iowa]: William Penn College, 1982), ISBN 0916358135 (text in Arabic and English, on opposite pages; notes in English)
- Rudolf Smend, De Dsu r'Rumma poeta Arabico et carmine ejus 'Mā bāl ʻayniki minhā al-māʼ yansakibu' commentatio (Bonn: Weber, 1874)
