= Abu Abdallah al-Husayn ibn Ahmad al-Mughallis =

Tenth-century CE poet

Abū Abdallāh al-Ḥusayn ibn ʾAḥmad al-Mughallis al-Marāghī (Arabic: أبو عبد الله الحسين بن أحمد المغلس المراغي; the epithet also appears as al-Mughallisī) was a tenth-century CE poet. He flourished around 381 AH/991 CE, being associated with the court of Bahāʾ al-Dawla. He is noted as one of the only known composers of Arabic riddles in the third century AH.

== Epithets ==
A few sources refer to Ibn al-Mughallis instead as al-Muflis ('the bankrupt'), but this is due to scribal confusion of the Arabic letters غ and ف: in medial position these look similar, and short vowels are not written, so that المغلس 'al-Mughallis' was miscopied as المفلس 'al-muflis'. Mughallis has been glossed to mean 'the one who tarries'.

The epithet al-Marāghī has been thought to suggest that al-Mughallis originated in the Adharbayjani town of Maragheh.

== Works ==
According to Bilal Orfali, the eleventh-century literary scholar ʻAbd al-Malik ibn Muḥammad Thaʻālibī quotes from al-Mughallis's poetry in many of his works. His poetry anthology Yatīma includes al-Mughallis's work in 'the third region of the Yatīma al-Dahr: on the clever curiosities of the inhabitants of Jibāl, Fārs, Jurjān, and Ṭabaristān' (القسم الثالث من يتيمة الدهر في محاسن أهل العصر وهو يشتملعلى ملح أشعار أهل الجبال وفارس وجرجان وطبرستان)', specifically the eighth chapter, 'mention of all the poets of al-Jabal and those who went there from Iraq and other places, and the clever curiosities of their accounts and poems' (في ذكر سائر شعراء الجبل والطارئين عليه من العراق وغيرها وملح أخبارهم وأشعارهم). The collection quotes two riddles, on a touchstone (محك الذهب) and banner (اللواء), and a little more poetry besides.

Thaʻālibī included more of al-Mughallis's poems in the sequel to the Yatīma, his Tatimma al-Yatīma, where al-Mughallis appears in the second region, entitled: 'completion of the second region on the beauties of the Iraqīs – rather, their best achievements and clever related curiosities' (Arabic: تتمة القسم الثاني في محاسن أشعار أهل العراق بل أحاسنها وما يتصل بها من ملح أخبارهم). According to both the Beirut edition of 1983 and Radwan's critical edition of 1972, the Tatimma records eleven riddles by al-Mughallis along with a brief excerpt from a ghazal.

List of riddles
Principal source	Solution			Lines	Metre
Yatīma	مِحَكُّ الذَهَبِ	miḥakku al-dhahabi	touchstone for gold	2	Ṭawīl
	اللِّواءُ	al-liwāʾu	pennant	2	Ṭawīl
Tatimma	نَخْلَةُ عَلى شاطِئ نَهْرِ مِن دِجْلةِ	nakhlatu ʿalā shāṭiʾ nahri min Dijlati	palm tree on the shore of the River Tigris	2	Mutaqārib
	السُفْرةُ	sufratu	drawstring bag for food	6	Wāfir
	البَيْضَةُ	al-bayḍatu	egg	2	Ṭawīl
	بَاقَةُ الْبَقْلِ	bāqatu al-baqli	bundle of herbs/vegetables	2	Munsariḥ
	الزُنْبورُ	al-zunbūr	hornet	6	Rajaz
	الْمِقْرَاضُ	al-miqrāḍu	scissors	2	Hazaj
	الْسَّيْفُ	al-sayfu	sword	2	Mutaqārib
	الْمِيزَابُ	al-mīzābu	gutter	5	Rajaz
	ُالْكِتَاب	al-kitābu	book	2	Ṭawīl
	صورَتِهِ الَّتِي يَرَاهَا فِي الْمِرْآةِ	ṣūratu-hu allatī yarā-hā fī al-mirāti	the image one sees in the mirror	2	Ṭawīl
	الْحَمَّامُ	al-ḥammāmu	the baths	4	Ṭawīl
al-Wāfī bi-al-wafayāt	القَبَّانُ	al-qabbānu	steelyard	3	Mutaqārib

== Primary sources ==
- aṣ-Ṣafadī, Salah al-Dīn (2000), ʿAdnān al-Baḥīt, Muḥammạd (ed.), "al-Wāfī bi ʾl-wafayāt", Bibliotheca Islamica (in Arabic), 29, Beirut: Dar Ehia al-Tourath al-Arabi, vol. 13 p. 202 [no. 3555]
- ʿAbd al-Malik ibn Muḥammad Thaʿālibī, Yatīma:
  - ʿAbd al-Malik ibn Muḥammad Thaʿālibī, Yatīmat al-dahr fī shuʿarāʾ ahl al-ʿaṣr (يتيمة الدهر في شعراء أهلالعصر), 4 vols (Damascus: [al-Maṭbaʿah al-Ḥifnīyah] دمشق : المطبعة الحفنية, 1302 AH [1885 CE]), II 228.
  - Yatīmat al-dahr fī shuʿarāʾ ahl al-ʿaṣr يتيمة الدهر في محاسن أهل العصر, ed. by Muḥammad Muḥyī al-Dīn ʿAbd al-Ḥamīd محمد محي الدين عبدالحميد, 4 vols (Cairo 1956), vol. 3 pp. 415–16.
  - Yatīmat al-dahr fī maḥāsin ahl al-ʿaṣr maʿ al-tatimma wa-l-fahāris (يتيمة الدهر في شعراء أهل العصر مع التتمة والفهارس), ed. by Mufīd Muḥammad Qumayḥah, 6 vols (Bayrūt: Dār al-Kutub al-ʿIlmīyah (دار الكتب العلمية), 1983), vol. 3 p. 463 (ch 34), p. 468 (ch 34), p. 481 (ch 42)
- ʻAbd al-Malik ibn Muḥammad Thaʻālibī, Tatimma:
  - Ahmad Shawqi Radwan (ed.), 'Thaʿālibī's “Tatimmat al-Yatīmah”: A Critical Edition and a Study of the Author as Anthologist and Literary Critic' (unpublished PhD thesis, University of Manchester, 1972), pp. 67–69 [ch. 66].
  - Yatīmat al-dahr fī maḥāsin ahl al-ʿaṣr maʿ al-tatimma wa-l-fahāris (يتيمة الدهر في شعراء أهل العصر مع التتمة والفهارس), ed. by Mufīd Muḥammad Qumayḥah, 6 vols (Bayrūt: Dār al-Kutub al-ʿIlmīyah (دار الكتب العلمية), 1983), vol. 5 pp. 24-26 [al-Tatimma ch. 11].
