= Al-Sari al-Raffa' =

Iraqi poet (died 973)

Al-Sarī al-Raffāʾ
- السري الرفاء
- Born: Abū l-Ḥasan al-Sarī ibn Aḥmad ibn al-Sarī al-Kindī al-Raffāʾ al-Mawṣilī; Mosul, Abbasid Caliphate (present-day Iraq)
- Died: 362 AH / 973 CE
- Occupation: Poet
- Writing career
- Language: Arabic
- Notable work: al-Muḥibb wa-l-maḥbūb wa-l-mashmūm wa-l-mashrūb

Al-Sarī al-Raffāʾ (Arabic: السري الرفاء; died 362 AH / 973 CE), by his full Arabic name Abū l-Ḥasan al-Sarī ibn Aḥmad ibn al-Sarī al-Kindī al-Raffāʾ al-Mawṣilī (Arabic: أبو الحسن السري بن أحمد بن السري الكندي الرفاء الموصلي, lit. 'Abū l-Ḥasan al-Sarī, son of Aḥmad, son of al-Sarī, from the Kinda tribe, the Darner from Mosul'), was an Iraqi poet in the court of emir Sayf al-Dawla, noted for his riddles and ekphrastic poetry. He compiled the anthology al-Muḥibb wa-l-maḥbūb wa-l-mashmūm wa-l-mashrūb, an extensive collection of 'verses about love, fragrant plants, and wine'.

== Sample poem ==
One of al-Sarī's riddles runs as follows:

Aʿdadtu li-l-layli idhā l-laylu ghasaq, / wa-qayyada l-alḥāẓa min dūni l-ṭuruq,

Quḍbāna tibrin ʿariyat ʿani l-waraq / shifāʾuhā in maruḍat ḍarbu l-ʿunuq.

أعددت لليل إذا الليل غسق / وقيد الألحاظ من دون الطرق
قضبان تبر عريت عن الورق / شفاؤها إن مرضت ضرب العنق

I prepared for the night (when it darkened and fettered the eyes, obscuring the roads)
Leaveless twigs of gold which, should they wilt, may be reanimated by cutting their necks.

The answer is 'candles'.

== Editions ==
- Al-Sarī al-Raffāʾ, Dīwān al-Sarī al-Raffāʾ, ed. by Ḥabīb Ḥusayn al-Ḥasani, 2 vols. (Baghdad: Manshūrāt Wizārat al-Thaqāfah wa-l-Aʿlām, 1981).
- Al-Sarī b. Aḥmad al-Raffāʾ, al-Muḥibb wa-l-maḥbūb wa-l-mashmūm wa-l-mashrūb, ed. Miṣbāḥ Ghalawinjī (vols 1-3) and Majīd Ḥasan al-Dhahabī (vol. 4), 4 vols (Damascus: Maṭbūʿāt Majmaʿ al-Lughah al-ʿArabiyyah bi-Dimashq 1986–87).
