= Al-Hatimi =

Arabic-language scholar

Abū ʿAlī Muḥmmad b. al-Ḥasan b. al-Muẓaffar al-Ḥātimī (Arabic: أبو علي محمد بن الحسن بن المظفر الحاتمي) (died Baghdad 26 April 998 CE [27 Rabīʿ II 388 AH]) was an Arabic-language scholar.

== Works ==
His key works of which substantial portions survive are:

- al-Risāla al-mūḍiḥa [fī dḥikr sariḳāt Abi ’l-Ṭayyib al-Mutanabbī wa-saḳiṭ s̲h̲iʿrih], D̲j̲abhat al-adab, Munāẓarat Abī Alī al-Ḥātimī li-Abi ’l-Ṭayyib, a tract in the form of a dialogue between Aristotle and the poet al-Mutanabbī, who is caricatured and whose poetry is criticised. (This was allegedly followed by a Risāla Ḥāūmiyya, now lost, reversing al-Ḥātimī's previous position to praise al-Mutanabbī.)
  - Fu'ād Afrām al-Bustānī (ed.), 'Ar-Risāla al-Ḥātimīya', Machriq, 29 (1931), 132-9, 196-204, 273-80, 348-55, 461-4, 623-32, 759-67, 854-9, 925-34 [also published as a single volume: Beirut: Imprimerie Catholique, 1931].
  - O. Rescher (ed. and trans.), 'Die Risālet El-Hātimijje', Islamica, 2 (1926), 439-73 (a facsimile edition with translation).
  - Yosef Tobi, 'The Hebrew Transcription of Risālat al-Hātimī: A Comparative Study Between Sayings Attributed to Aristotle and Poetic Verses Attributed to Mutanabbī (Cambridge, T.S. Arabic, 45.2)', in Between Hebrew and Arabic Poetry: Studies in Spanish Medieval Hebrew Poetry (Leiden: Brill, 2010), ISBN 978-90-04-18499-2. Includes transcription and translation.
- Ḥilyat al-muḥāḍara ['the qualities of lecturing'].
  - Yaakov Mashiah, 'The Terminology of Hebrew Prosody and Rhetoric with Special Reference to Arabic Origins' (unpublished Ph.D. dissertation, Columbia University, 1975), OCLC 948991005
  - Ḥilyat al-muḥāḍara, fī ṣinā‘at al-shi‘r, ed. by Ja‘far al-Kattānī (Baghdad, 1979)
  - Seeger A. Bonebakker, 'Sariqa and Formula: Three Chapters from Ḥātimī's Ḥilyat al-Muḥāḍara’, Annali, Istituto Universitario Orientale di Napoli, 46 (1986), 367–89.
  - Seeger A. Bonebakker, 'Four Chapters from the "Ḥilyat al-muḥāḍara" — Arabic Texts', Quaderni di Studi Arabi, 17 (1999), 29-52
