= Francisco Pons y Boigues =

Spanish Arabist and historian

Francisco Pons y Boigues (1861-1899) was a Spanish Arabist and historian.

== Life ==
Francisco Pons Boigues was born into humble circumstances in 1861 in the Valencian town of Carcaixent. He gained an early education at the seminar in Valencia. Following an opportune meeting with the Arabist Francisco Codera y Zaidín (editor of the series Bibliotheca arabico-hispana) he became his pupil. Codera encouraged him to study at the Faculty of Arts in Madrid. There his teacher was Marcelino Menéndez Pelayo. He graduated in 1885. Among his published texts were Apuntes de un viaje por Argelia y Túnez ('Notes of a trip through Algeria and Tunisia') (1888), Notes on the Mozarabic writings of Toledo that are preserved in the National Historical Archive (Madrid, 1897), Essay Biobibliography on Arabic-Spanish historians and geographers (Madrid, 1898), Two important works of Ibn Hazm) and Hayy ibn Yaqdhan of Ibn Tufail (Zaragoza, 1900, with a preface by Marcelino Menéndez Pelayo), among others. He died in 1899.

== Bibliography ==
- Cejador Frauca, Julio (1919). Historia de la lengua y literatura castellana (in Spanish). Vol. X. Madrid: Tip. of the "Rev. of arch., bibl. and museums".
- López García, Barnabas (2013), "Francisco Pons Boigues: Los "Apuntes de un viaje por Argelia y Túnez"", Revista de Estudios Internacionales Mediterráneos (in Spanish) (15), ISSN 1887-4460
- Menéndez y Pelayo, Marcelino (1899). Homenaje a Menéndez y Pelayo en el año vigésimo de su profesorado, estudios de erudición española (in Spanish). Madrid: Suárez.
