= Abū 'Amr al-Ḥasan ibn 'Alī ibn Ghassān al-Shākir al-Baṣrī =

Abū ʿAmr al-Ḥasan ibn ʿAlī ibn Ghassān al-Shākir al-Baṣrī, also known as al-Shākir al-Baṣrī (fl. second half of the eleventh century CE) was an Arabic-language scholar from Basra, known for his expertise in ḥadīth, the Qurʾan, fiqh and adab. What survives of his work today are his riddles, of which 74 are recorded in verse and ten in prose in the Kitāb al-iʿjāz fī l-aḥājī wa-l-alghāz bi-rasm al-amīr Qaymāz (Inimitable Book on Quizzes and Riddles, Composed for the Emir Qaymāz) composed during the reign of Caliph al-Muqtafī (1136–60CE) by Abū al-Maʿālī Saʿd ibn ʿAlī al-Ḥaẓīrī. Al-Shākir al-Baṣrī composed a work called Kitāb al-Marmūs, known now only from the material which al-Ḥaẓīrī drew from it. The Kitāb al-Marmūs contained both riddles by al-Shākir and by at least ten others; it was one of al-Ḥaẓīrī's principal sources. The main source for al-Shākir's life is the Irshād al-Arīb ilā Maʾrifat al-Adīb by Yāqūt al-Hamawī.

An example of al-Shākir's riddles is the following:

وخامِلٍ في العُيُونِ مُتَّضَعِ * تَرَاهُ في عِدّةٍ من الخِلَعِ
تَرْفَعُهُ الشَّمْسُ بَعْدَ مَا ارْتَفَعَتْ * رُبَّ وَاضِعٍ عَلَا بِمُرْتَفِعِ

Many an obscure fellow, lowered in people's eyes, whom you see amid a pile of cast-off clothes,
Does the sun raise high after it rises — many a person rises thanks to an exalted man!

The solution is 'washing line'.
