= Abu al-'Abbas al-Dabbi =

Abū al-ʿAbbās al-Ḍabbī (Arabic: أَبو العبَّاس الضَّبِّي, fl. c. 1000) was a protege of Ṣāḥib ibn ʿAbbād (a Persian scholar and statesman, grand vizier to the Buyid rulers of Ray 976–95 CE). Al-Ḍabbī is noted today for his poetry. Inter alia, he composed the book Kitāb al-Armāz fī l-alġāz. Although it is now lost, it may have been the first book of riddles in Arabic; nine poems survive from it in the Kitāb al-iʿjāz fī l-aḥājī wa-l-alghāz bi-rasm al-amīr Qaymāz (Inimitable Book on Quizzes and Riddles, Composed for the Emir Qaymāz) composed during the reign of Caliph al-Muqtafī (1136–60CE) by Abū al-Maʿālī Saʿd ibn ʿAlī al-Ḥaẓīrī. Al-Ḥaẓīrī himself did not think highly of al-Ḍabbī's riddles, however, finding them too obscure.

One example of al-Ḍabbī's poetry, as translated by Mansour Ajami, is as follows:

لا تَرْكُنَنَّ إِلى الْفِراقِ * وَإنْ سَكَنْتَ إلى الْعِناقِ
فَالشَّمْسُ عِنْدَ غُرُوبِها * تَصْفَرُّ مِنْ فَرَقِ الْفِراقِ

Trust not separation * even if you trust in union.
Indeed, the sun turns pale * at sunset for fear of separation
