= Waṣf =

Genre of Arabic poetry

Waṣf (Arabic: وصف, lit. 'attribute' or 'description'; pl. أوصاف, awṣāf) is an ancient style of Arabic poetry, which can be characterised as descriptive verse. The concept of waṣf was also borrowed into Persian, which developed its own rich poetic tradition in this mode.

== Role in Arabic verse ==
Waṣf was one of four kinds of poetry in which medieval Arabic poets were expected to be competent, alongside 'the boast (fakhr), the invective (hijā’), and the elegy (marthiya)'.

Probably deriving from the descriptions of the abandoned campsite and beloved in the ancient qasida's erotic prelude, and of animals and landscape in the journey section, or rahiil, it evolved into a genre of its own in Abbasid Baghdad and later in Spain. The tradition in Arabic was highly developed, with poets often devoting entire collections to elaborate treatments of single subjects, such as hunting animals, kinds of flowers, and specific objects. [...] While one might initially be inclined to take the genre of wasf poetry lightly--since it involves "mere" description, in fact an argument could be made for seeing this genre as, in some instances, central to the poetry of the period.

In waṣf love poems, each part of a lover's body is described and praised in turn, often using exotic, extravagant, or even far-fetched metaphors. The Song of Solomon is a prominent example of such a poem, and other examples can be found in the Thousand and One Nights. The images given in this type of poetry are not literally descriptive. Instead, they convey the delight of the lover for the beloved, where the lover finds freshness and splendor in the body as a reflected image in the world. Other varieties of waṣf include literary riddles.

== Outside Arabic ==
This genre had a long history and later became a favorite of the troubadour poets and the authors of sonnets in the Elizabethan era. This renaissance literature was popularized by French authors via Italian and was called the blasons anatomiques or blazon (see Italian poet Petrarch). Shakespeare effectively ended this movement with his Sonnet 130 which satirized the form. For instance, the first line in that satire reads, "My mistress' eyes are nothing like the sun."
