= Nasīb (poetry) =

Arabic literary form

Nasīb (Arabic: النسيب) is an Arabic literary form, 'usually defined as an erotic or amatory prelude to the type of long poem called a qaṣīdah.' However, although at the beginning of the form's development nasīb meant 'love-song', it came to cover much wider kinds of content: 'The nasīb usually is understood as the first part of the qaṣīdah where the poet remembers his beloved. In later ages the nasīb stood alone, and in that sense the meaning came to be understood as erotic and love poetry.'

== Traditional Nasīb Poetry ==
Early and prominent examples of the nasīb appear in the Mu'allaqāt of the sixth-century poets Dhu al-Rumma, Antarah ibn Shaddad and Imru' al-Qais. The poetry of these early authors varies greatly from being pure eroticism to expressing great love and yearning.

To quote from Imru' al-Qais's Mu'allaqah:

Stay! let us weep, while memory tries to trace
The long-lost fair one's sand-girt dwelling place;
Though the rude winds have swept the sandy plain,
Still some faint traces of that spot remain.
My comrades reined their coursers by my side,
And "Yield not, yield not to despair" they cried.
(Tears were my sole reply; yet what avail
Tears shed on sands, or sighs upon the gale?)

== Nasīb Poetry in Sufism ==
The nasīb is a common theme in sufist poetry, where the beloved yearned for is God. This genre often blends the erotic and mystical, challenging the traditional views of spirituality. While the poetry is sometimes dedicated in name to other men or women, the poetry is always allegorical in nature to God.

One of the most prominent and influential poets in this genre in regards to Sufism is Ibn Arabi (Muhyiddin Ibn al-Arabi, 1165–1240), who often used the nasīb poem as a vessel for exploring the metaphysical truths about divine union (fana) in Islam. This exploration of merging the contrasting two genres of faith and eroticism did not go unmarred, as Ibn Arabi was forced to write a commentary on his own works after being accused of writing strictly erotic poetry.

The following is an excerpt from the 11th poem in The Interpreter of Desires (Tarjumān al-ashwāq), a collection of over 61 nasībs (not including qaṣīdah). This poem is titled "Gentle Now, Doves of the Thornberry and Moringa Thicket" and is often cited as one of the most famous and influential poems in Sufism:

Gentle now,

doves of the thornberry and moringa thicket,

don’t add to my heart-ache

your sighs.

Gentle now,

or your sad cooing

will reveal the love I hide

the sorrow I hide away.

I echo back, in the evening,

in the morning, echo,

the longing of a love-sick lover,

the moaning of the lost.

In a grove of tamarisks

spirits wrestled,

bending the limbs down over me,

passing me away.

They brought yearning,

breaking of the heart,

and other new twists of pain,

putting me through it.

Who is there for me in Jám’,

and the Stoning-Place at Miná,

who for me at Tamarisk Grove,

or at the way-station of Na’mān?

Hour by hour

they circle my heart

in rapture, in love-ache,

and touch my pillars with a kiss.

As the best of creation

circled the Ka’ba,

which reason with its proofs

called unworthy,

And kissed the stones there –

and he was the Natiq!

And what is the house of stone

compared to a man or a woman?

They swore, and how often!

they’d never change – piling up vows.

She who dyes herself red with henna

is faithless.

A white-blazed gazelle

is an amazing sight,

red-dye signalling,

eyelids hinting,

Pasture between breastbones

and innards.

Marvel,

a garden among the flames!

My heart can take on

any form:

a meadow for gazelles,

a cloister for monks,

For the idols, sacred ground,

Ka’ba for the circling pilgrim,

the tables of the Torah,

the scrolls of the Qur’án.

I profess the religion of love;

wherever its caravan turns along the way,

that is the belief,

the faith I keep.

Like Bishr,

Hind and her sister,

love-mad Qays and his lost Láyla,

Máyya and her lover Ghaylán.

In this poem, Ibn Arabi clearly talks about the love of God as the foundational basis for his views of religion. He also directly references other famed lovers in Arabic poetry and even directly mentions sixth century poet Dhu al-Rumma later in the text who wrote explicit eroticism in his nasīb poetry.
