= Ben Shabbethai =

Ben Shabbethai (Hebrew: בן שבתי; arabised as Ibn Shabbethai) is a Hebrew patronymic or patronymic surname literally meaning "son of Shabbethai. Notable people with the name include:

- Judah ibn Shabbethai, Jewish-Spanish poet of the end of the 12th century
- Ḥayyim ben Shabbethai, Sephardic rabbi and Talmudist
