= Al-Hariri of Basra =

Arab poet and scholar (1054–1122)

Al-Hariri الحریری البصری
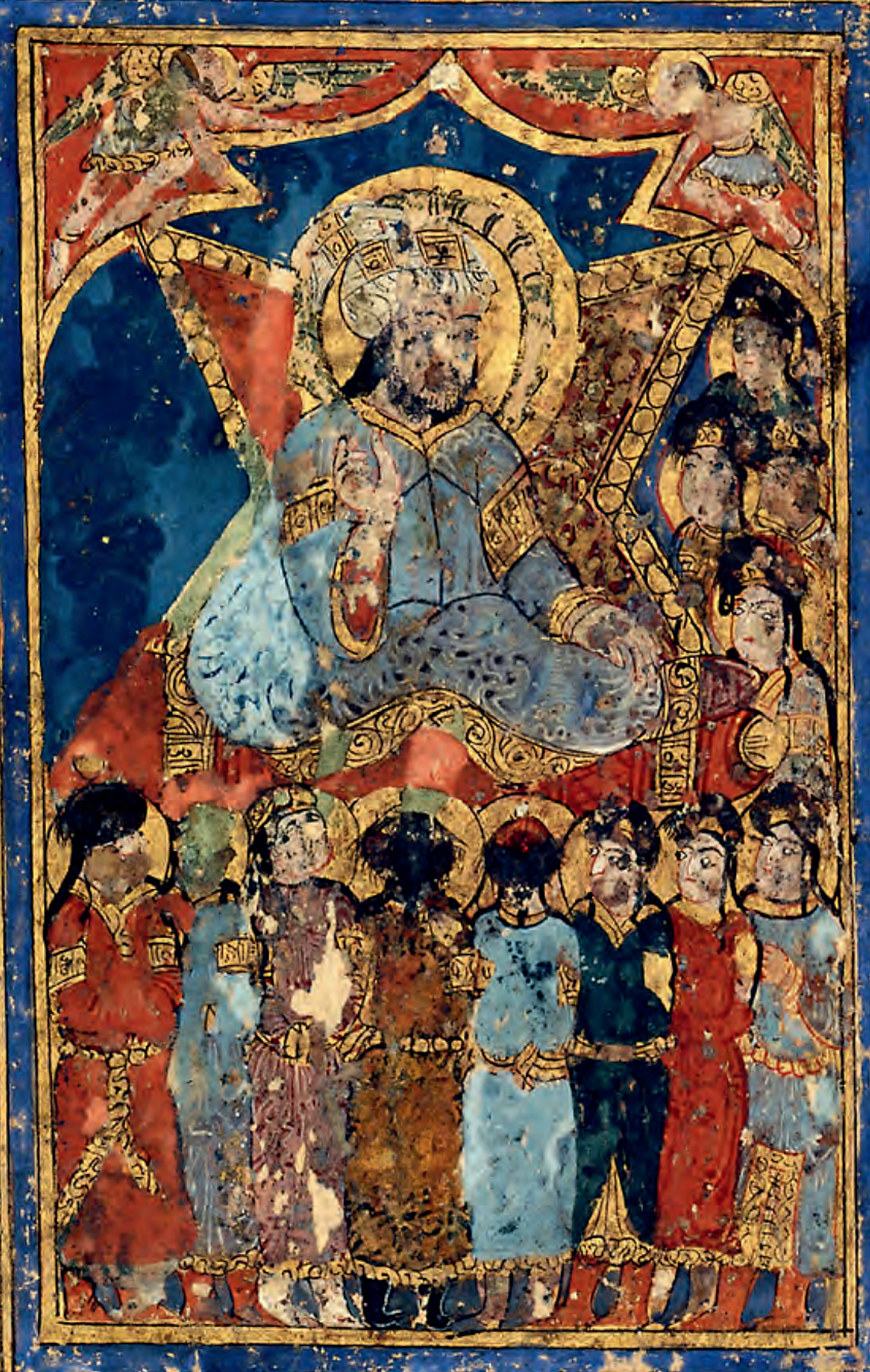
- Possible depiction of al-Hariri, in the Maqamat of al-Hariri, 1237 CE edition, probably Baghdad.
- Born: Abū Muhammad al-Qāsim ibn ʿAlī ibn Muhammad ibn ʿUthmān al-Harīrī أبو محمد القاسم بن علي بن محمد بن عثمان الحريري c. 1054; Al-Mashan Village, near Basra, Abbasid Caliphate, now Basra Governorate, Iraq
- Died: 10 September 1122 (aged 67–68); Basra, Abbasid Caliphate, now Basra Governorate, Iraq
- Occupations: Arab Poet, writer, Scholar of Arabic language, Official of Seljuqs
- Writing career
- Notable work: Maqamat al-Hariri مقامات الحريري

Al-Hariri of Basra (Arabic: أبو محمد القاسم بن علي بن محمد بن عثمان الحريري, romanized: Abū Muhammad al-Qāsim ibn ʿAlī ibn Muhammad ibn ʿUthmān al-Harīrī; c. 1054 – 10 September 1122) was a poet belonging to the Beni Harram tribe of Bedouin Arabs, who lived and died in the city of Basra, modern Iraq. He was a scholar of the Arabic language and a dignitary of the Seljuk Empire, which ruled Iraq during his lifetime, from 1055 to 1135.

He is known for his Maqamat al-Hariri (also known as the ‘'Assemblies of Hariri'’), a collection of some 50 stories written in the Maqama style, a mix of verse and literary prose. For more than eight centuries, Al-Hariri's best known work, his Maqamat has been regarded as one of the greatest treasure in Arabic literature after the Quran and the Pre-Islamic poetic canons. Although the maqamat did not originate with al-Hariri, he elevated the genre to an art form.

== Biography ==
Al-Hariri was born 446 AH (1054 AD) and died in his native city of Basra on 6 Rajab, AH 516 (10 September 1122 AD). Although his place of birth is uncertain, scholars suggest that he was probably born in Mashan near Basra, where his family had a palm tree plantation. and only resided in Basra after the age of maturity. The street where he died, Bani Haram, was a place where certain families were known to have settled and was a centre of Basra's silk manufacturing industry. His name, al-Hariri, probably reflects his residence (hariri = silk manufacturer or silk merchant).

He liked to boast of his Arab heritage: he was a descendant of Rabi’at al Faras, son of Nizār, the son of Ma’add, the son of Adnan al-Ya`muri, who was a companion of Muhammad.

His family had achieved great wealth, enabling him to receive a good education, studying with Al-Qasabani. He is known to have studied jurisprudence, after which time he became a munshi (official writer). His occupation is generally described as a high official. Al-Hariri divided his time between Basra where he had his business interests and Baghdad where he carried out his literary activities.

He is best known for writing Maqamat al-Hariri (مقامات الحريري, also known as The Assemblies of al-Hariri), a virtuosic display of saj', consisting of 50 anecdotes written in stylized prose, which was once memorized by heart by scholars, and Mulhat al-i'rab fi al-nawh, an extensive poem on grammar.

Various accounts of Al-Hariri's inspiration to write the Maqmat can be found in the literature. One account, which has become the established account, was related by Al Hariri's son, Abu al-Qasim Abdullah, is that the author and his servants, were seated in a mosque in Banu Haaran when an indigent man, by the name of Abu Zayd, dressed in ragged cloaks, entered and spoke with great fluency and elegance. The speaker related the story of his native city of Saruj being ransacked and his daughter taken captive.

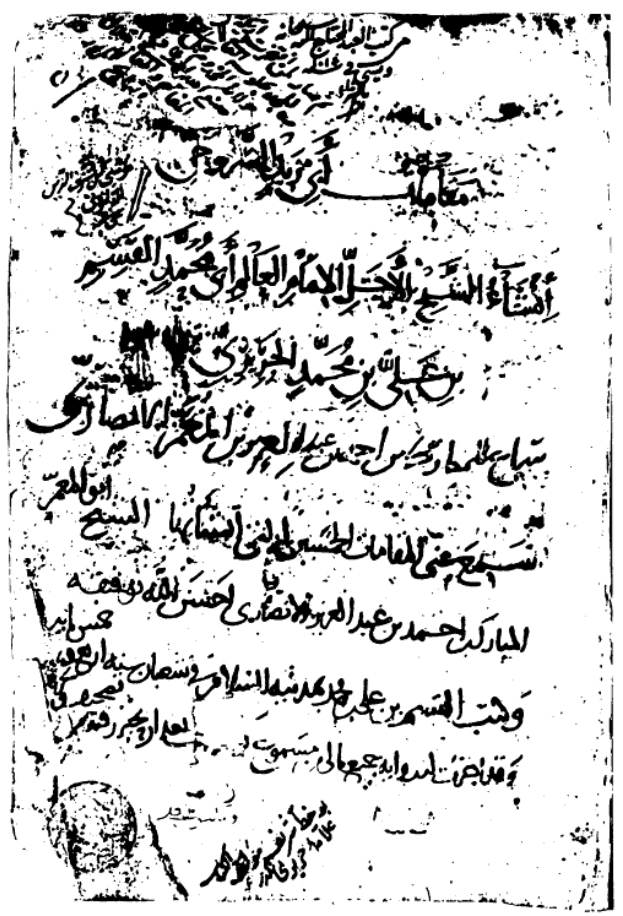
Ms Cairo Adab 105, folio 5a. Title and autograph ijaza written by al-Hariri himself, for the copyist, in 1110-11.

As soon as it first appeared, Al-Hariri's Maqamat attained enormous popularity across the Arab-speaking world, with people travelling from as far afield as Andalusia (Spain) to hear the verse read from the author's lips. The work's alternative title, ‘'The Assemblies'’ comes from the fact that maqamat were recited before an assembled audience. Even during the author's lifetime, the work was worthy of memorisation, public recitation and literary commentaries. Al-Hariri himself recited his Maqamat before learned audiences and scholars. Audience members would take dictation or make corrections to their own personal manuscripts. At the time, this type of public recitation was the main method for disseminating copies of literary works in the Arab speaking world.

When al-Hariri had written 40 maqamat, he collected them into a single volume and headed to Baghdad where he expected a triumphant reception. However, his opponents accused him of plagiarism; they claimed that the Assemblies were in fact the work of a writer from the Western Maghreb who had died in Baghdad and whose papers had fallen into Al-Hariri's hands. To test the merit of such claims, the Vizier sent for al-Hariri and invited him to compose a letter on a specified subject. However, Al-Hariri was not an improviser, rather he required long periods of solitude in which to compose his stories, and although he retired to a corner for a lengthy period, he was unable to produce anything and was ashamed. In an effort to redeem his reputation, al -Hariri returned to Basra where he composed ten additional maqamat in the following months.

He married and had two sons. His sons were trained in the recitation of their father's Maqamat.

In terms of al-Hariri's physical appearance, he was very short in stature and wore a beard, which he had the habit of plucking when he was deep in thought He was described as not a particularly handsome man. When visitors shunned his appearance, he would tell them: "I am a man to be heard, not seen".

=== Political context ===
Al-Hariri lived in Iraq at a time when the Seljuks ruled over the region. The region of Mesopotamia was under the control of the Seljuk Empire from 1055 to 1135, since the Oghuz Turk Tughril Beg had expelled the Shiite Buyid dynasty. Tughril Beg entered Baghdad in 1055, and was the first Seljuk ruler to style himself Sultan and Protector of the Abbasid Caliphate. Mesopotamia remained under the control of the Great Seljuks during the reign of Muhammad I Tapar (1082–1118 CE), but from 1119, his 14 years old son Mahmud II (1118–1131) was restricted to the only rule of Iraq, while Sanjar took control of the rest of the Empire. In order to counter the ambitions of Abbasid Caliph al-Mustarshid (1118–1135), who wanted to acquire world dominance, in 1124 Mahmūd granted the city of Wasit to Imad al-Din Zengi (born 1085) as an ıqta, and conferred him the Military Governorship of Basra together with Baghdad and the whole of Iraq in 1127. That same year, Imad al-Din Zengi was also named Governor of Mosul, where the Atabegdom of Mosul was formed.

== Work ==
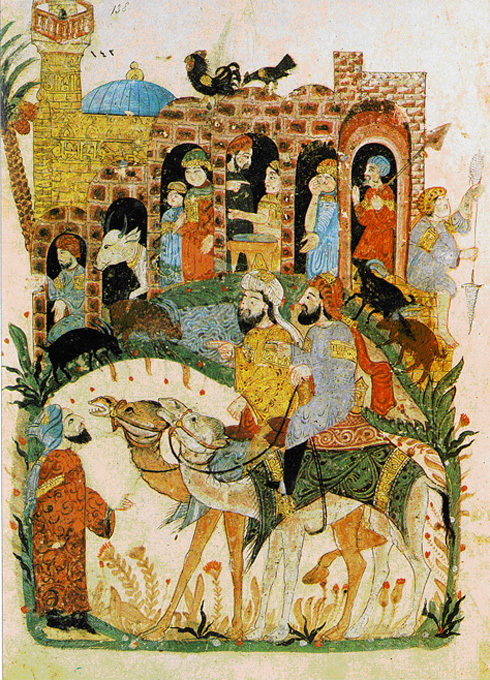
"Discussion Near a Village", a miniature illustrating the 43rd maqāmah of a 1237 edition of al-Hariri's Maqamat al-Hariri, painted by Yaḥyā ibn Maḥmūd al-Wāsiṭī. Painting in the Bibliothèque Nationale, Paris. MS Arabe 5847 fol. 138v.

For more than eight centuries, Al-Hariri's best known work, his Maqamat has been regarded as the greatest treasure in Arabic literature after the Quran.

=== Al-Hariri's Maqamat ===
As a genre, the maqamat was originally developed by Badi' al-Zaman al-Hamadani (969–1008), but Al-Hariri elevated it into major literary form.

Al-Hariri's Maqamat consists of 50 anecdotes, related by Abu Zayd to Al-Harith who is understood to be the work's narrator. Abu Zayd is a wanderer and confidence trickster who is able to survive using his wiles and his eloquence. The work makes extensive use of language as spoken by desert Arabs – its idioms, proverbs and subtle expressions.

Al-Hariri's Maqamat made extensive use of literary artifice. In one maqama, known as "the reversal" sentences can be read in reverse, giving each passage an opposite meaning. In the 26th maqama, known as the "Spotted", the protagonist composes a "spotted letter" in which a character with a dot is alternated with a character without a dot. In a passage that al-Hariri added to a version of his Maqamat, he lists a variety of techniques: "Language, serious and light, jewells of eloquence, verses from the Qur'an, choice metaphors, Arab proverbs, grammatical riddles, double meanings of words, discourses, orations and entertaining jests."

Like most books of the period, maqamat were intended to be read aloud before a large gathering. Oral retellings of maqamat were often improvised, however, al-Hariri who composed his stories in private, intended them as finished works that he expected to be recited without embellishment.

This text was translated into Hebrew by Yehuda Alharizi (d. 1225) as Maḥberet itiʾel and was a major influence on Alharizi's own maqamat, the Taḥkemoni.

=== Other works ===
A good deal of his correspondence has survived. He also wrote some qasidas that made extensive use of alliteration. He also wrote two treatises on grammar:

- Durra al-Ghawwas – The Pearl of the Diver Being a Treatise of the Mistakes [in Arabic Grammar] Committed by Persons of Rank – an anthology of grammatical errors written in verse
- Mulhat al-Irab – The Beauties of Grammar – a collection of poems

=== Editions and translations ===
The work was copied many times by the various Islamic dynasties due to the royal custom of commissioning copies of well-known manuscripts for their private libraries. From the 13th and 14th centuries, the work was translated into a number of Middle-Eastern languages including Hebrew and Turkish. Some of the earliest copies and imitations of the Maqamat in European languages appeared in Andalusia as early as the 13th century. Western audiences, however, were only introduced to the work when the first Latin translations appeared in the 17th century.

During al-Hariri's lifetime, editions of his work were published without any illustrations. From the early 13th century, illustrated editions of the manuscript began to appear. Ten different illustrated editions were known for some time, but with the discovery of a new illustrated edition in 1960, the total now stands at eleven. One of the earliest and most widely known illustrated editions is that by al-Wasiti (1236), now in the Bibliothèque nationale de France.

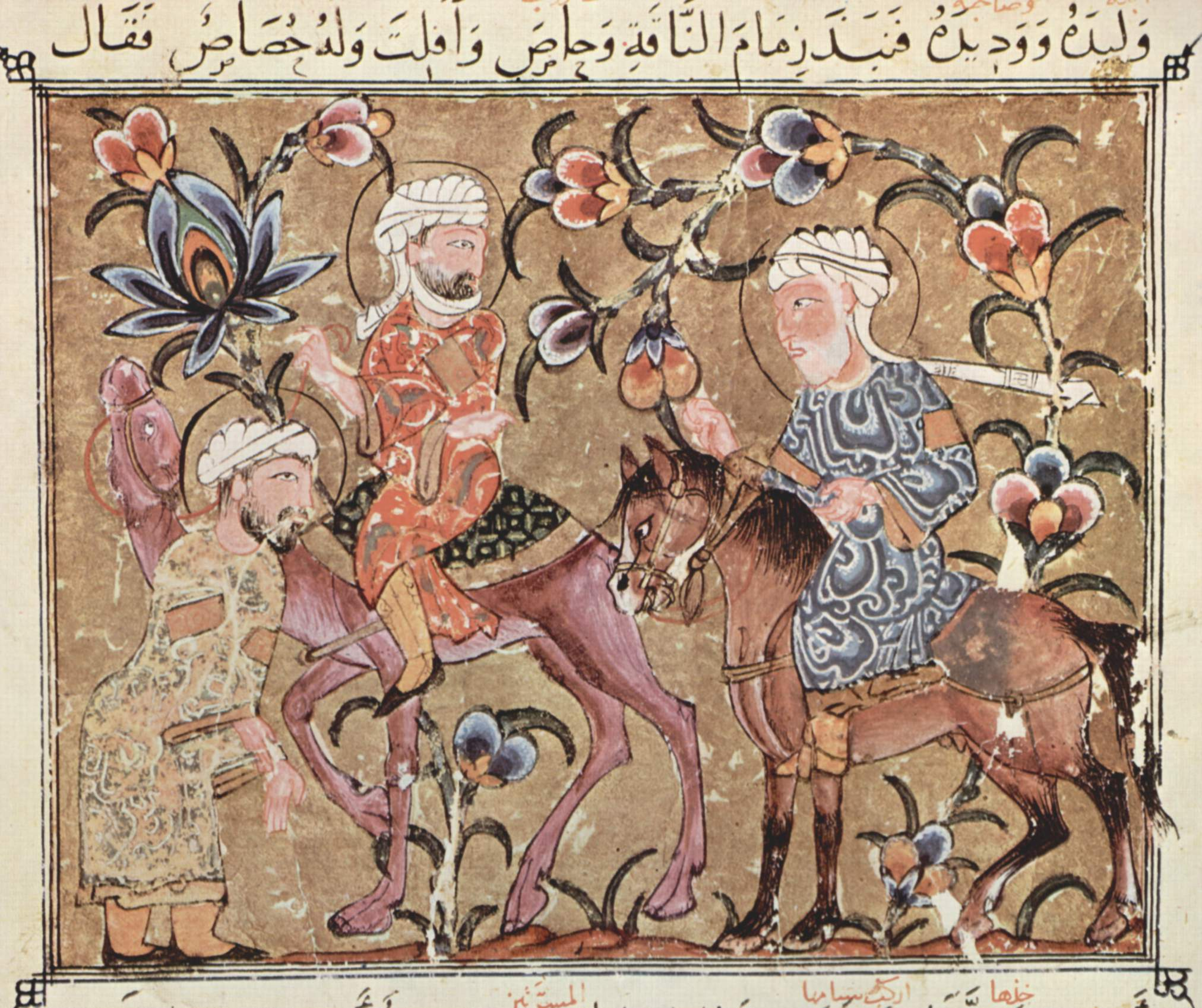
Al-Harith helps Abu Zayd to retrieve his stolen camel. Illustration for the 27th maqamat, from a manuscript in the Bodleian Library, Oxford

The most famous translation of his Maqamat was a German version by the poet and Orientalist Friedrich Rückert as Die Verwandlungen von Abu Serug and sought to emulate the rhymes and wordplay of the original. The main English translation is the nineteenth-century edition by Thomas Chenery and Francis Joseph Steingass.

Hundreds of printed editions of the Maqamat can be found. Notable editions and translations include:

- Friedrich Rückert (trans), Die Verwandlungen des Abu Seid von Serug, oder die Makamen des Hariri, Cotta, 1837 (in German)
- Thomas Chenery and Francis J. Steingass (trans), – The Assemblies of Al-Ḥarîri: with an introduction about the life and times of al-Hariri (Translated from the Arabic with Notes Historical and Grammatical), Oriental Translation Fund, New Series, 3, 2 vols, London: Royal Asiatic Society, 1867 (in English)
- Amina Shah (trans.), The Assemblies of Al-Hariri: Fifty Encounters with the Shaykh Abu Zayd of Seruj, London, Octagon, 1980
- Theodore Preston (trans.), Makamat or Rhetorical Anecdotes of Al Hariri of Basra: Translated from the Original Arabic with Annotations, Cambridge: Cambridge University Press, 1850
- Michael Cooperson (ed.), Maqamat Abi Zayd al-Saruji by Al-Hariri, NYU Library of Arabic Literature: New York University Press, 2020. ISBN 9781479800896 (Arabic edition)
- Michael Cooperson (trans.) Impostures by Al-Hariri, NYU Library of Arabic Literature: New York University Press, 2020. ISBN 9781479810567 (English translation)

== See also ==
- Arabic literature
- Badi' al-Zaman al-Hamadani

== Sources ==
- Jaakko Hämeen-Anttila, Maqama: A History of a Genre, Otto Harrassowitz Verlag, 2002
- Charles F. Horne, ed., The Sacred Books and Early Literature of the East, New York, Parke, Austin, & Lipscomb, 1917, Vol. VI: Medieval Arabia, pp. 143–201, (contains maqāmāt 1–12)
- Shah, Amina (1980). The assemblies of al-Hariri : fifty encounters with the Shaykh Abu Zayd of Seruj. London : Octagon Press. ISBN 978-0-900860-86-7.
