= Judah ibn Shabbethai =

Spanish poet

Judah ibn Shabbethai (Hebrew: יהודה בן שבתי) was a Jewish poet in al-Andalus at the end of the 12th century. He has been identified with the physician Judah b. Isaac of Barcelona, who is praised as a poet by Yehuda Alharizi (ch. 46), but he may also have lived at Burgos.

Judah was a master of the "mosaic" style, and skillfully applied Biblical and Talmudic phrases; his humor was spontaneous. He was the author of Milḥemet ha-Ḥokmah weha-'Osher and Minḥat Yehudah Sone ha-Nashim. The former work, also called the Melek Rab, is in the style of the maqama, in rimed prose interspersed with short poems. It was written in 1214, and is addressed to the nasi Frankfurt, who is called upon, at the end of the work, to act as judge in a poetical dispute. It appeared at Constantinople in or around 1543, and was probably printed for the last time as an appendix to Abraham ben Ḥasdai's Ben ha-Melek weha-Nazir (Warsaw, 1894).

Minḥat Yehudah Sone ha-Nashim (called also Sefer Zeraḥ or Taḥkemoni) likewise is written in the style of the maqama. It is a humorous satire on women, and is a much better piece of work than the Milḥemet. It was written in 1218. It was dedicated to Abraham ibn Yoṣer of the Banu Alfakhar. Like the Milḥemet, it appears to have been first printed at Constantinople, in 1543, the last reprint being in Eliezer ben Solomon Ashkenazi's Ṭa'am Zeḳenim (Frankfurt, 1854).

== Jewish Encyclopedia bibliography ==
- Steinschneider, Cat. Bodl. col. 1369 et seq.
