= Ibn Nāqiyā =

Islamic literary scholar (1020–1092)

Ibn Nāqiyā al-Baghdādī (Arabic: ابن ناقيا البغدادي, full name ʿAbd Allāh ibn Muḥammad ibn al-Ḥusayn ibn Dāwūd Ibn Nāqiyā, born 15 March 1020 in Baghdad, died in the same place 15 February 1092) was a noted Arabic-language litteratus.

== Life ==
Ibn Nāqiyā spent his childhood in a district of Baghdad previously occupied by the palaces of the Tahirids and their outbuildings. Apparently he did not travel much, and his only known patron was one Muḥammad ibn Muḥammad al-Shahrazūrī. The city was considered one of the most important and interesting cities in the world at the time, populated by philosophers, artists, free spirits and merchants — a milieu that is also reflected in Ibn Nāqiyā's works. Ibn Nāqiyā composed an elegy for the Shāfiʿī scholar Abū Isḥāq al-Shīrāzī and has accordingly been thought to have been a disciple of his.

== Works ==
Ibn Nāqiyā al-Baghdādī was famed for his literary knowledge. These include an important diwān, now lost, and a résumé of the Kitāb al-Aghānī. But his al-Jumān fī tashbīhāt al-Qur'ān survives, in at least two manuscripts. The work comprises 36 chapters, each named after a Koranic sūra: each chapter identifies similes (tashbīhāt) found in that chapter, and often in others besides, and adduced parallels from both Arabic verse and rhyming prose (sajʿ). The work thus constitutes a kind of literary commentary on a selection of the Qur'an's sūras (beginning with sūra 2, al-Baqara, and ending with 105, al-Fīl), though in total it cites 167 individual verses of the Qur'an from 68 different sūrāt. In Matthew Keegan's estimation, he 'compiles his examples from the Arabic poetic tradition to provide, on the one hand, the Jāhilī background for the Quran and, on the other, an account of the way poets responded to and developed quranic imagery. The effect is to highlight the intertextualities between the Quran and the Arabic poetic tradition ... Ibn Nāqiyā seems to delight in exploring the intertextualities between the quranic similes and the Arabic poetic tradition'.

Most noted, however, is Ibn Nāqiyā's collection of maqāmāt, a particular form of satirical rhyming prose. Preserved in a single manuscript, his Maqāmāt are considered a long-neglected treasure of Arabic literature. Herein the author makes fun of all conventions in an offensive and subversive way. The principal character is the versatile al-Yaschkuri, who cunningly and eloquently makes his way through the world. Sometimes disguised as a preacher, sometimes as a beggar, sometimes as a pious man, he travels the country and masters the challenges of life and survival in an outrageous and clever way.

== Editions and translations ==
=== al-Jumān fī tashbīhāt al-Qur'ān ===
Scholarly Arabic editions of this text have been published by Aḥmad Maṭlūb and Khadīja al-Ḥadīthī (Baghdad, 1968), Muṣtafā al-Ṣāwī al-Juwaynī (Alexandria, 1974) and Muḥammad Riḍwān al-Dāya (Beirut, 1991); Keegan views the first of these as the best. Keegan gives an English translation of the commentary on Qur'an sura 76, al-Insān.

=== Maqāmāt ===
- Oskar Rescher, Beiträge zur Maqamen-Literatur (Istanbul: Maṭbaʻa-i Aḥmad Kāmil, 1331 [1914 CE]), part iv, pp. 123–52 (edition of the Arabic)
- Maqāmāt Ibn Nāqiyā, ed. by Ḥasan ʿAbbās (Alexandria, 1988) (critical edition of the Arabic)
- Ibn Naqiya, Moscheen, Wein und böse Geister: Die zehn Verwandlungen des Bettlers al-Yaschkuri, trans. by Stefan Wild, Neue Orientalische Bibliothek (Munich: Beck, 2019), ISBN 978-3-406-73944-6 (German translation).
- Philip F. Kennedy, '[https://www.lancaster.ac.uk/jais/volume/docs/vol3/v3_5_Kennedy.htm Reason and Revelation, or a Philosopher's Squib (the Sixth Maqāma of Ibn Nāqiyā)', Journal of Arabic and Islamic Studies, 3 (2017), 84–113, doi:10.5617/jais.4557 (translation of and commentary on maqāma 6)
