= Al-Qasabani =

Arab philologist and grammarian

Al-Fadl bin Mohammed Al-Qasabani الفضل بن محمد القصباني

Personal life
- Born: Basrah, Arabia
- Died: 444 AH (1052/1053 CE) Basrah, Abbasid Caliphate (present-day Iraq)
- Era: Caliphate of Al-Qa'im bi-amri 'llah
- Region: Abbasid Caliphate
- Main interest(s): Philology, Grammar
- Notable work(s): Muqadimah fi al-Nahw (مقدمة في النحو); ‘Introduction to Grammar’
- Known for: Muslim scholar

Religious life
- Religion: Islam

Muslim leader
- Influenced: Al-Hariri

Abu Al-Qasim Al-Fadl bin Mohammed bin Ali bin Al-Fadl Al-Qasabani (Arabic: أبو القاسم الفضل بن محمد بن علي بن الفضل القصباني) (died 444 AH), was a well known Arab philologist and grammarian of the Abbasid Caliphate.

== Life ==
He was born in Basra, in the Bani Haram neighborhood, where he spent his entire life. He was blind, and many students of knowledge studied under him, the most famous of whom were: Al-Hariri, Al-Khatib Al-Tabrizi, and the judge of Basra, Abu Al-Faraj Al-Basri.

He used to sell reeds, so he was nicknamed Al-Qasabani. He was also a poet. He died during the era of the Caliphate of Al-Qa'im bi-amri 'llah in 444 AH/1052 AD.

== Works ==
Among his works are the following:

- Muqadimah fi al-Nahw
- Kitab Al-Amali
- Al-Safwa fi Ashaar Al-Arab w Mukhtareha
- Al-Hawashi ala Al-Idhah
- Al-Hawashi ala Al-Sihah

== See also ==
- List of pre-modern Arab scientists and scholars
