= Maqama =

Arabic literary genre

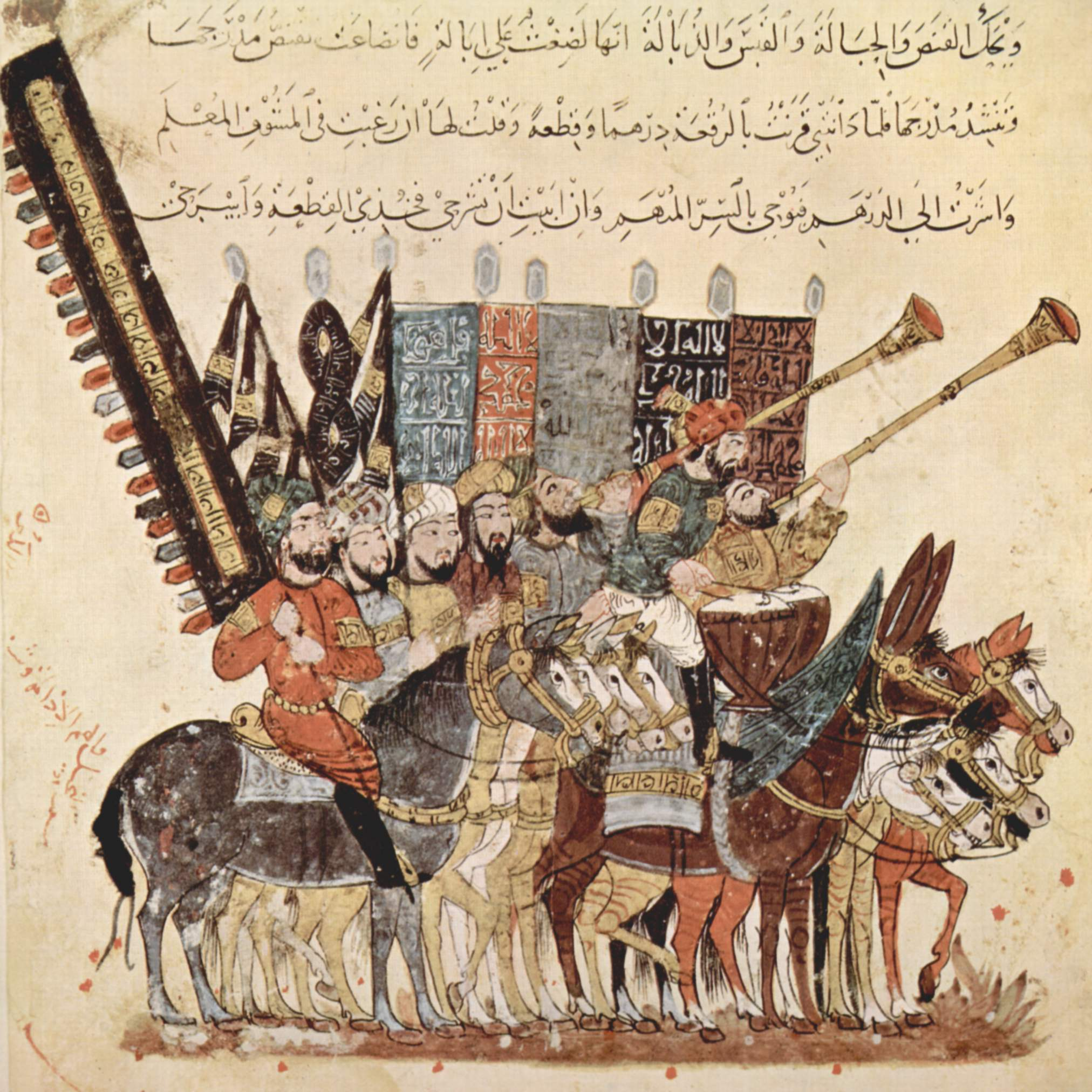
The 7th Maqāma of Al-Hariri, illustration by Yahya ibn Mahmud al-Wasiti from the 1237 manuscript (BNF ms. arabe 5847).

The maqāma (Arabic: مقامة [maˈqaːma], literally "assembly"; plural maqāmāt, مقامات [maqaːˈmaːt]) is an (originally) Arabic prosimetric literary genre of picaresque short stories originating in the tenth century C.E. The maqāmāt are anecdotes told by a fictitious narrator which typically follow the escapades of a roguish protagonist as the two repeatedly encounter each other in their travels. The genre is known for its literary and rhetorical complexity, as well as its alternating use of rhymed verse with a form of Arabic rhymed prose known as saj'. The two most well-known authors within the genre are Badī' al-Zaman al-Hamadhāni, one of its earliest exponents, and al-Harīrī of Basra, whose maqāmāt are commonly held responsible for the genre's rise in popularity from the eleventh century onward. Interest in al-Hariri's Maqāmāt spread throughout much of the Islamic Empire, with translations and original works appearing in Hebrew, Syriac and Persian. Many authors still contribute to and draw inspiration from the literary genre of Maqāma to this day.

Professionally illustrated and calligraphed manuscripts were produced for private use. Of these manuscripts, only 11 surviving copies are known to exist; all of them are of al-Harīrī's Maqāmāt, and none are from before the thirteenth century C.E. These illustrations tend to be colored linework on a white background; they often depict the narrator and protagonist's escapades together, and so most of these compositions (unlike much of medieval Islamic Art) primarily feature human figures with notably expressive faces and gestures. The illustrated manuscripts made extensive use of captions, likely added after the manuscripts' completion to provide key context to the illustration or to provide information that could not be gleaned from the illustration alone. Art found in the illustrations of al-Harīrī's Maqāmāt appears to include borrowed visual motifs from medieval Christian and Judaic art as well as references to architecture found within the Islamic empire. In addition, the illustrations tend to share formal qualities with the art of shadow play.

== Narrative structure ==
The maqāma are typically understood to be short picaresques told by a fictitious narrator about a low-class trickster protagonist who uses disguises, refined language and sophisticated rhetoric to swindle onlookers out of their money. In the case of the Maqāmāt al-Harīrī, the same narrator al-Harīth tells of his numerous encounters with the roguish protagonist Abu Zayd, in various cities and under varying circumstances. The maqāmāt are known for their use of badi (ornate linguistic style) interspersed with saj' (rhyming prose). Like much Arabic literature of its time, the maqāmāt also typically blended serious or genuine narratives and tone (jidd) with humor and jest (hazl). Many scholars propose that the events and characters within the maqāmāt are primarily vehicles through which the author can showcase his own literary, poetic and rhetorical skills.

There have been attempts to schematize loose plot outlines for the maqāmāt. J. Hämeen-Anttila puts forth the following pattern for a typical maqāma:

Isnad → General Introduction → Link → Episode Proper → Recognition Scene → Envoi (→ Finale)

Alain Qian expands on this structure somewhat. The isnad (citation or "backing" used to verify the legitimacy of a statement, most commonly used in verifying hadith) lends a sense of credibility to the narrator, even if he is known to be fictional. In the general introduction the narrator tells the audience where he was and/or what he was doing in the city in question, providing context for the anecdote to follow. The link transitions from general introduction into the episode proper, where the events of the anecdote are relayed. After a time in the anecdote itself, the narrator and the audience (those of whom that are familiar with the genre) both recognize the protagonist of the anecdote as the recurring roguish character. After this recognition scene the maqāma is ended with envoi (summation in verse), followed occasionally by a finale in which the narrator and protagonist part ways.

A different schema for Maqāmāt al-Harīrī has been proposed by K. Okazaki, similar to Anttila's except for its mirror-like structure:

"Arrival of the narrator in town → Encounter with the protagonist → Speech (poetry) → Reward → Recognition ← Reproach ← Justification (Poetry) ← Parting"

In this proposed schema the arrows do not indicate chronology but rather the rise and fall of narrative suspense (in a manner not unlike Gustav Freytag's plot pyramid). The proposed structure illustrates that the narrator arrives in a city and comes across the protagonist, often drawn to them by their eloquent speech and poor dress. The protagonist is often employing this speech to the end of asking for money or other aid. After he receives his reward, the narrator sees through the protagonist's disguise and recognizes him as the recurring protagonist Abu Zayd, then tells Abu Zayd off for his continual abuse of others' good faith and charity. Abu Zayd justifies his actions in verse and the two part ways.

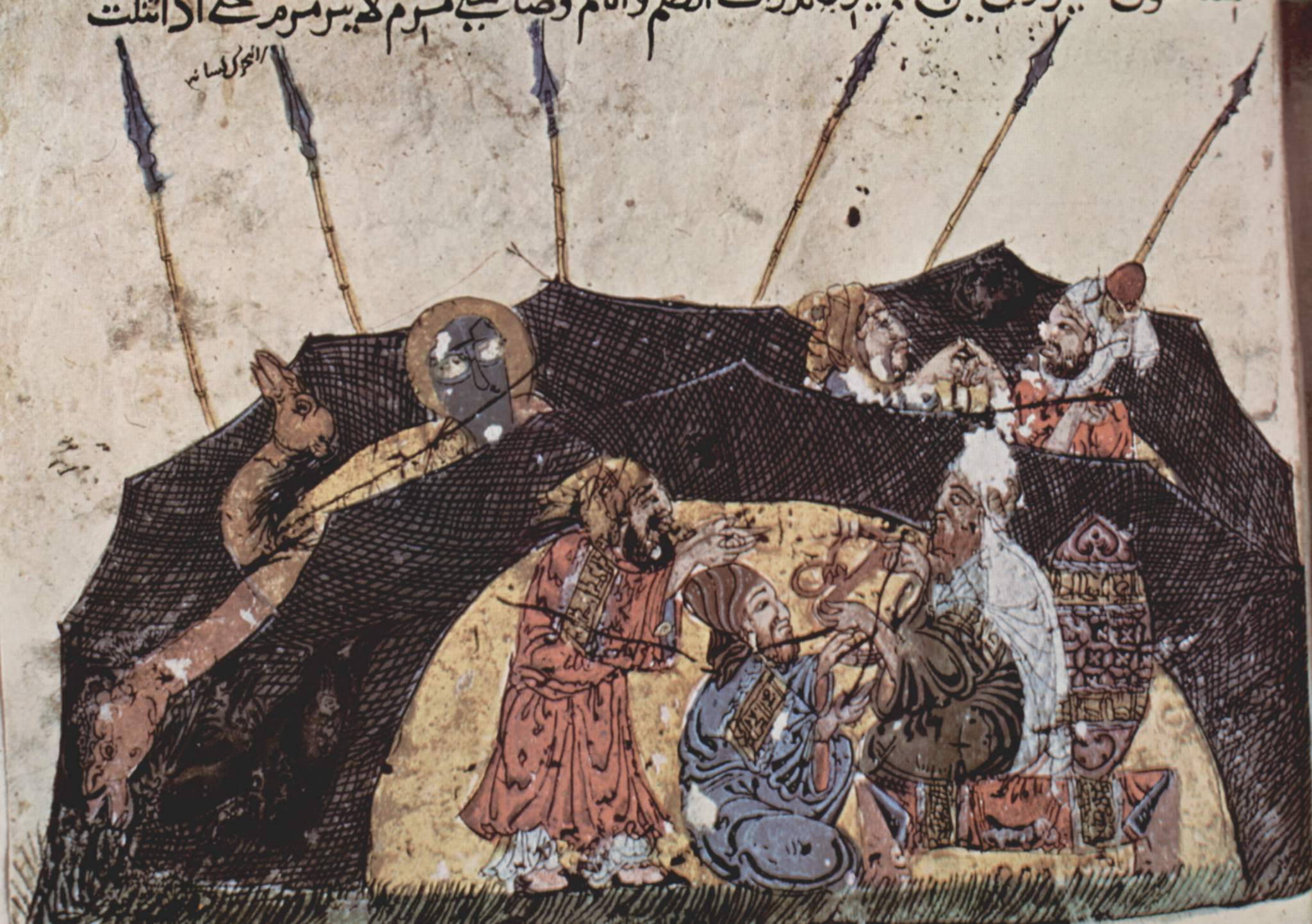
Maqamat, Iraq, c. 1225–1235

== Origins and development ==
Maqāma arose in the tenth century CE from the Arabic genre of prose known as adab (referring to "culture", "manners", "belles lettres"). There is some debate as to the precise origins of the genre. While it has generally been accepted that the genre was first established with the publication of Badī' al-Zaman al-Hamadhāni's Maqāmāt in the tenth century, there are some scholars that credit Ahmad Ibn Faris (d. 383/1004) as the originator of the maqāmāt and al-Hamadhānī's predecessor, and others who credit the even earlier author Ibn Duraid (d. 933).

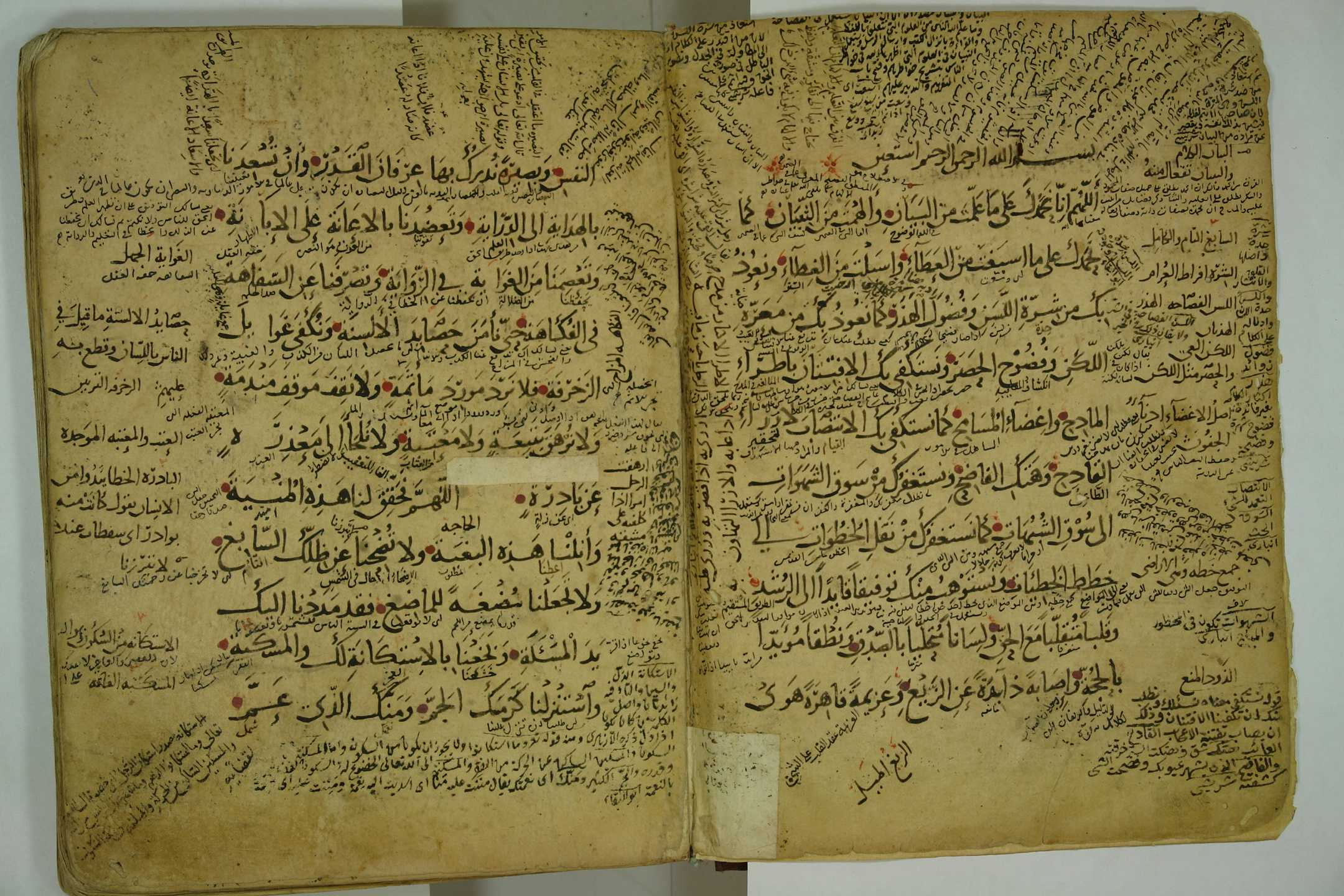
Manuscript of maqamat al-Hariri

Al-Hamadhānī drew much of his inspiration from compilations of anecdotes such as those collected by al-Taniikhi, and may have found the prototype for his roguish and eloquent protagonist in the work of al-Jahiz (d. 869) There are two significant departures from works such as these that al-Hamadhānī is commonly credited for originating. First is his use of saj' throughout an anecdote, including the narrative itself. Saj' is an ornate form of rhyming prose interspersed with full verse, the use of which had thus far been restricted to religious and political works. This claim has been contested, with some evidence that the use of saj' throughout a narrative was not unique to al-Hamadhānī's maqāmāt at the time of their writing. The second literary innovation al-Hamadhānī is credited for is the fact that unlike most works from his time or before it, al-Hamadhānī's maqāmāt are openly fictitious (rather than covertly fictitious or openly non-fictitious).

Al-Hamadhānī's work was followed shortly thereafter by a collection of ten maqāmāt by literatus Ibn Nāqiyā (d. 1092), though the genre would only gain most of its popularity after the creation of Maqāmāt al-Harīrī, a century after al-Hamadhānī's work had been created. The popularity of al-Harīrī's maqāmāt is such that they were worthy of memorization, recitation, and scholarly criticism during his lifetime, and he has been the most well-known author in the genre for most of its history. The genre spread to the east, with maqāmāt appearing in Persian, Hebrew and Syriac. Maqāmāt also appeared to the west in al-Andalus (now Andalusia, Spain), courtesy of a small group of Andalusian poets who reported that after hearing al-Harīrī himself recite his own work in his Baghdad garden, they chose to recite the maqāma to those in al-Andalus who had not attended.

Despite the genre's geographical reach, interest in the maqāma was confined to a relatively small population of wealthy literary scholars. These literati would attend small private recitations of al-Harīrī's maqāmāt, during which improvisations and embellishments were made as the reader or audience saw fit. The maqāmāt were also produced in professionally calligraphed and illustrated manuscripts. These were likely made for private consumption for individuals or small groups, as the ownership of representational images was commonly frowned upon in Islamic tradition. To art historians' knowledge, only eleven illustrated manuscripts of the maqāmāt survive today, with none of them having been made before the 13th century.

=== Etymology ===
The meaning and original use of the word "maqāma" to describe the literary genre are the subject of some scholarly debate. Al-Hamadhānī referred to his anecdotes as "maqāma" in a letter written as early as the year 922 C.E. Amina Shah writes in her introduction to The Assemblies of Al-Harīrī that the word maqāma may be taken to mean "a place where one stands upright", "the persons assembled at any place", or "the discourses delivered or conversations held in any such assembly". Qian wrote that, at the time that al-Hamadhānī wrote and compiled his Maqāmāt, the term maqāma and its common substitutes could be used to denote an assembly, a heroic boast, or a religious or moralizing sermon, among other meanings. The word maqāma or maqām (used interchangeably at this time) were often used in explaining eloquence and speech appropriate for particular situations. Given this historical context, Qian proposes that al-Hamadhānī may have intended a moralistic or religious meaning in his use of the word maqāma to describe his work; however, the word has since come to exclusively refer to the literary genre, and conversations like those one might find within its works.

Beyond its historical context, there has been some discussion of the word maqāma as it refers to the genre. K. Okazaki wrote that the word maqāma as "assembly" is meant to reflect the assemblages of characters within the narrative witnessing the acts committed and subsequent trials faced by the roguish protagonist. Alain George argues that this reflection is two-fold. By his assertion, not only does "assembly" refer to the characters within the narrative, but it also refers to the small audiences of elite scholars who, according to George, would attend private readings of al-Harīrī's Maqāmāt.

=== Development in Hebrew ===
The maqāma genre was also cultivated in Hebrew in Spain, beginning with Yehūda al-Ḥarīzī's translation of al-Harīrī's maqāmāt into Hebrew (c. 1218), which he titled maḥberōt 'ītī'ēl ("the maqāmāt of Ithiel"). Two years later, he composed his own maḥbārōt, titled Sēfer Taḥkemōnī ("The Book of the Tachmonite"). With this work, al-Ḥarīzī sought to raise the literary prestige of Hebrew to exceed that of Classical Arabic, just as the bulk of Iberian Jewry was finding itself living in a Spanish-speaking, Latin- or Hebrew-literate environment and Arabic was becoming less commonly studied and read.

Some Hebrew maqāmāt made more significant departures, structurally and stylistically, from the classical Arabic maqāmāt of al-Hamadhānī and al-Harīrī. Joseph ibn Zabara (end of the 12th-beginning of 13th century), a resident of Barcelona and Catalan speaker, wrote the Sēfer sha'ashū'īm ("The Book of Delights"), in which the author, the narrator, and the protagonist are all Ibn Zabara himself, and in which the episodes are arranged in linear, not cyclical fashion, in a way that anticipates the structure of Spanish picaresque novels such as the anonymous Lazarillo de Tormes (1554) and Guzmán de Alfarache (1599) by Mateo Alemán.

=== Notable exponents ===
- Abu 'l-Ḥusayn Aḥmad b. Fāris (d. 1004) – 10th century poet and intellectual, who some scholars suggest developed the maqamat genre, even before Hamadani
- Badi' al-Zaman al-Hamadani – 11th century Arabo-Persian writer generally credited as the originator of the maqamat genre
- Al-Hariri of Basra – 11th century Arab scholar, poet and writer who elevated the maqamat to a major literary art
- Ibn Sharaf al-Qairawani – 11th century Amerian poet
- Abu Muhammad b. Malik al-Qururrubi – 11th century Amerian poet
- Abu al-Hajjaj Yusuf ibn Ali al-Qudai – Andalusi poet and writer, who after witnessing a reading by Al-Hariri in April, 1111, took the genre back to al-Andalus (now Andalusia, Spain)
- Abu al-Tahir Muhammad ibn Yusuf al-Tamimi al-Saraqusti, known simply as Al-Saraqusti, (d. 1143) – a leading intellectual from Cordoba, al-Andalus, who imitated al-Hariri and whose work, "Maqamat Al-luzumiyah", has been described as a "masterpiece"
- Abu Abd Allah ibn Abi al-Khisal – Al-Andalus' scholar who wrote in the al-Hariri tradition
- Lisan al-Din ibn al-Khatib – Andalusi scholar who wrote in the al-Hariri tradition
- Al-Farthibsn Khaqan – Andalusian scholar who wrote in the al-Hariri tradition
- Qadhi Hamid al-Din Abu Bakr – 12th century Persian poet and writer
- Shayk Muslih al-Din Sadi – 13th century Persian poet and writer
- Judah al-Harizi – Medieval rabbi and poet, active in Spain, who wrote a Hebrew version of the maqama and translated al-Hariri's Maqamat into Hebrew, entitled, Tahkemoni.
- Joseph ibn Zabara (1140–1200) – Spanish-Jewish poet and satirist who composed a Hebrew maqamat
- Judah ibn Shabbetai – late 12th century Jewish-Spanish poet who composed several Hebrew versions of maqamat

== Illustrated manuscripts ==
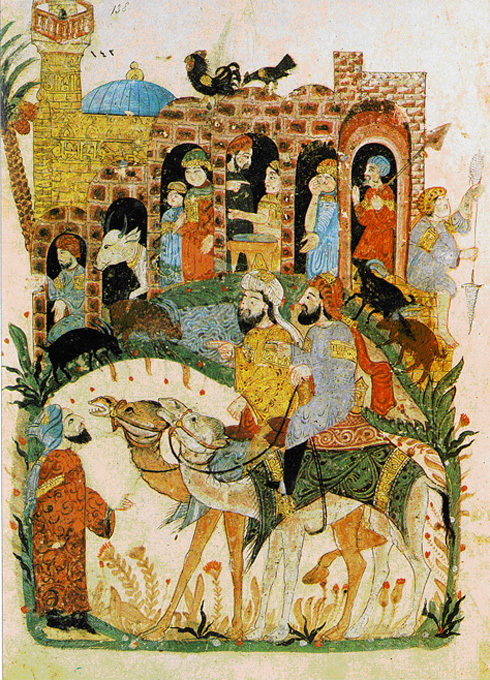
Congregation scene by al-Wasiti in the al-Ḥarīrī Maqāmāt showing a mosque with various animals

No known illustrations of maqamat exist prior to the 13th century. However, illustrations were added to maqamat to add grandeur and interest to the manuscripts, even though the text was usually performed orally in large groups, rather than read in solitude.

Common images across various Maqāmāt texts include: grand banquet events involving music and drinking, large groups congregated (sometimes in mosques), and general scenes involving the trickery of Abu Zayd as well as the frustration of Al Harith. Particularly in the Saint Petersburg Maqāmāt, these scenes were meant to be humorous to those reading the text, as they often were loosely associated with the poem the image was correlated with. These comical images were also shown through the over-exaggerated gestures, such as rigid elbows and knees, of the human figures portrayed as shown in the Vienna Maqāmāt.

The human figures expressed in these illustrations tended to be quite large in relation to the architecture they were occupying as well as typically against a blank, white background. Most of these images either took up an entire or half page, but were not incorporated within the text as a whole. The use of the double-page spread began to become popular during this time and were used extensively in these manuscripts. The color palettes were typical of this time and were the schemes often employed in Qurans.

While some of the images refer to the previous text in the manuscript, scholars cannot necessarily determine the relationship between the image and the text when they do not appear to relate to each other. Although the illustrations have a clear correlation with the text, the text does not need these images to serve its purpose. Therefore, these images can instead serve as a distraction to the reader rather than an aid. The difference of text and images is also used to cater to the taste of different groups of people. For example, the text is read by the audience who are experts of Arabic language and literature, while the images can be helpful for those with less formal education.

=== Captions ===
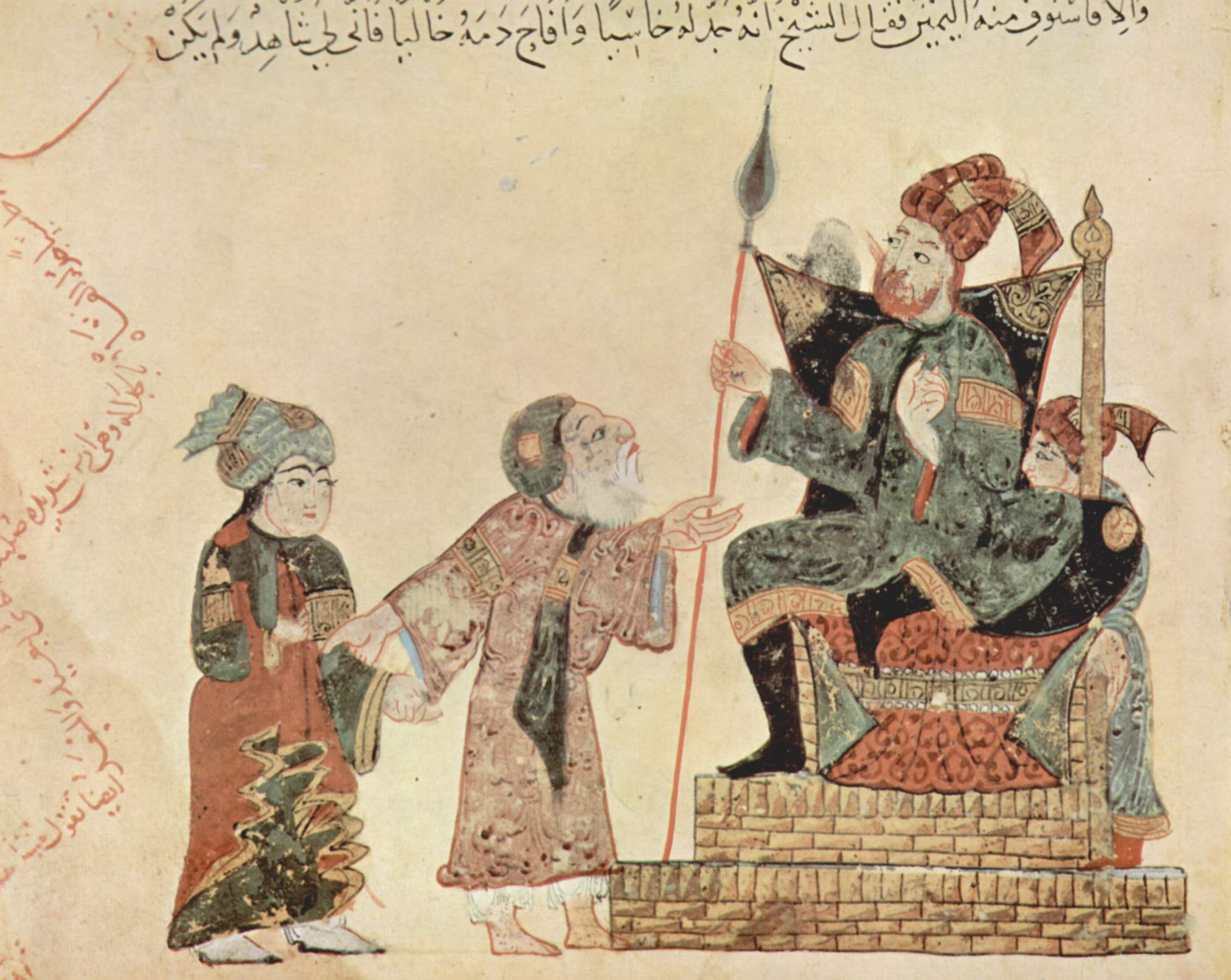
Scene in the Al-Hariri Maqāmāt illustrated by al-Wasiti that appears to show an interaction with Abu Zayd, Al Harith, and an authority figure. A bent caption frames the image.

Captions were used extensively in Maqāmāt manuscripts; they were either added last, or perhaps even later in the manuscripts' existence, rather than during its completion. While the captions that were added to these illustrations did correspond to the text, they were often simplistic or only identified the figures in the image. This characteristic was irregular as compared to other manuscripts at the time such as the Mamluk Kalila wa Dimna. To use an example by Bernard O'Kane, there is a Maqāmāt illustration that shows a large crowd with underfed children and an elderly woman. However, this woman is instead the trickster Abu Zayd who is using these children as a ploy for empathy from the congregation of people. While you gain this knowledge from the text of the manuscript, the caption only reads "image of the old person and the youths," instead of implying the larger context of the scene.

However, these captions could also have been used to clarify what the illustrator failed to render in the images, rather than just an explanation of the scene produced. Captions also created a sense of picture framing in instances of small spaces for the text, often resulting in bent captions that created an enclosure for the picture.

=== Artistic influences ===
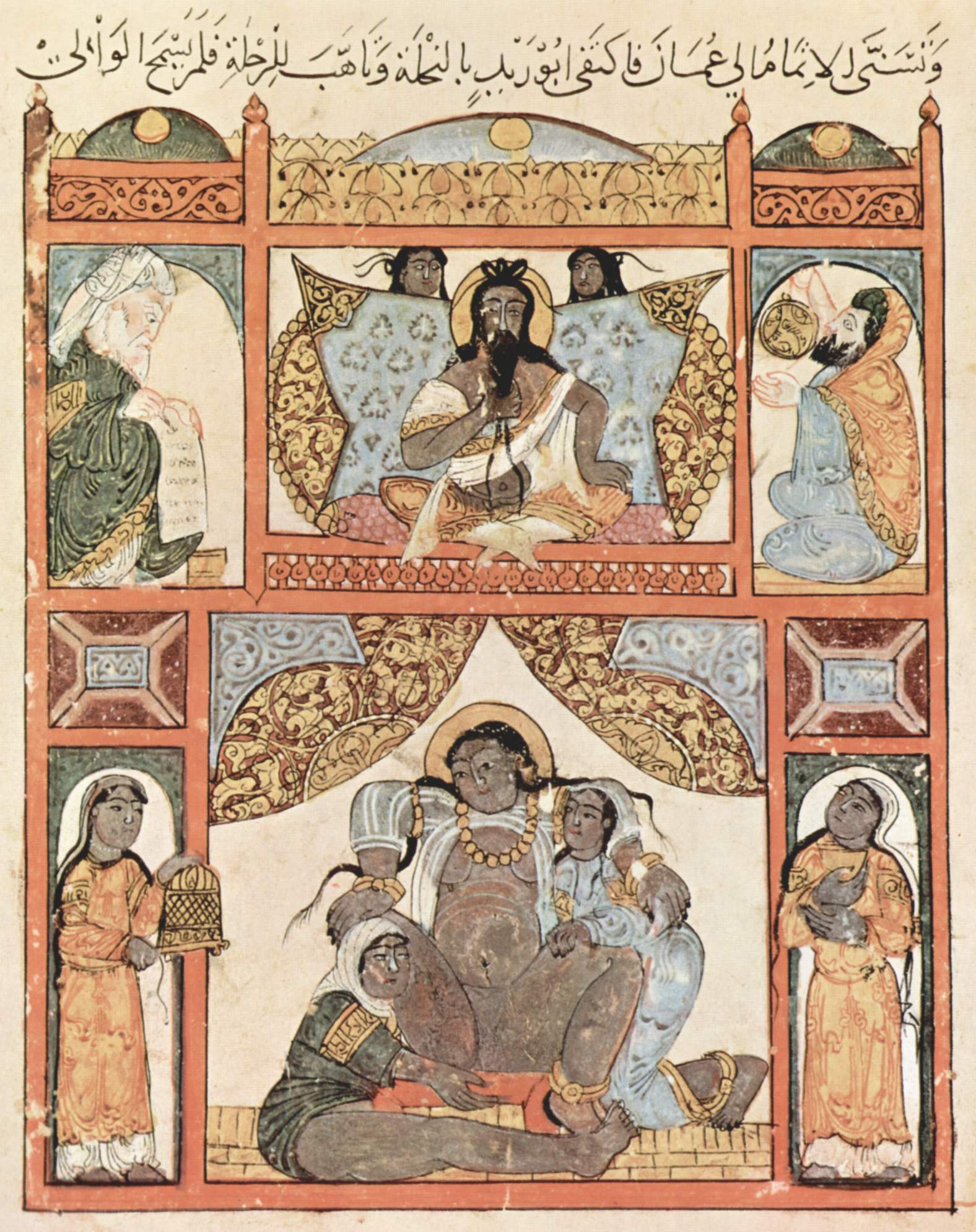
Scene in the Al-Hariri Maqâmât illustrated by al-Wasiti in 1237. Golden haloes surround various figures to differentiate them from the background or to indicate their role as authority figures.

The Maqāmāt illustrations have stylistic characteristics of other religions such as Christianity and Judaism. One of the main instances of Christian inspiration originates from the use of gold circles surrounding a figure's head to denote its holiness, typically used for saints in early medieval Christian manuscripts. However, it was not meant to signify a sacred figure, but rather it is thought to create a distinction from the blank background because of its common use for ordinary figures throughout the illustrations. Another Christian motif employed in these manuscripts is the particular treatment of the sky which also appeared in some Byzantine manuscripts. The Vienna Maqāmāt and several earlier Maqāmāt manuscripts also included some imagery from medieval Jewish culture, such as the inclusion of their particular type of gravestone. At this time, typical Islamic gravestones were minimalistic without many inscriptions, while several Jewish cemeteries included a type of small stepped stone grave marker. These Jewish gravestones were the ones illustrated in these manuscripts rather than the small Islamic headstones.

However, the illustrations in Maqāmāt manuscripts also included influences from the Islamic world, notably from the city of Baghdad. Specifically in the Istanbul Maqāmāt, several buildings do recall the architectural style and form of the city, notably shown through the Mustansiriya complex that appears to be replicated throughout the illustrations. The use of vegetal designs and specific rendering of authority figures also alludes back to the style of the Islamic world which can be seen through the Arabic translations of the Greek teachings of Dioscorides.

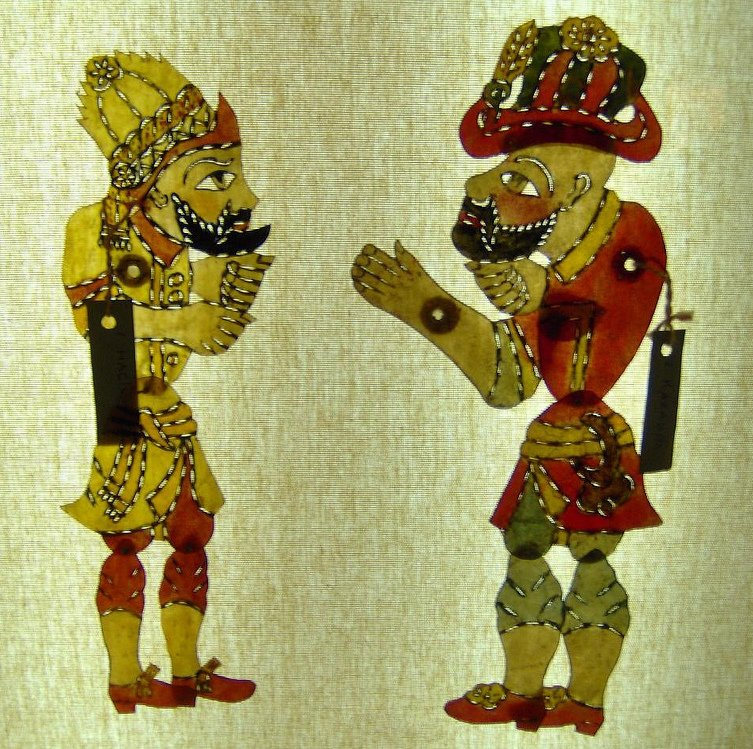
Shadow play Karagöz puppets from Turkey.

==== Shadow play ====
The illustrated Maqāmāt manuscripts made during the 13th century connect the idea of shadow play. This is shown through the emphasis of the outline, the dramatic behavior and mobile gestures of figures, the strong contrast between figures and the background, and the tendency of the figures being present in an unregulated setting. However, the Maqāmāt illustrations do not just emphasize the shadow and are instead full of bright colors, only using shadow to detail the environment around the figures. These similarities of the Maqāmāt illustration and shadow play may have some effect on the viewer of these illustrations. In other words, these images can help viewers understand the reason for a dramatic difference between the text and paintings by suggesting that these images were not made as an aid of the text, but rather as stand alone paintings.

=== Known manuscripts ===
Altogether, more than a hundred Maqamat manuscripts are known, but only 13 are illustrated, all belonging to the Maqamat of al-Hariri. They mainly cover a period of about 150 years. A first phase consists in manuscripts created between 1200 and 1256 in areas between Syria and Iraq. This phase is followed by a 50-year gap, corresponding to the Mongol invasions (invasion of Persia and Mesopotamia, with the Siege of Baghdad in 1258, and the invasion of the Levant). A second phase runs from around 1300 to 1337, during the Egyptian Mamluk period, with production probably centered around Cairo. One of the earliest and most widely known illustrated editions is that by al-Waisiti (completed in the year 1236), now in the Bibliothèque nationale de France (in Paris).

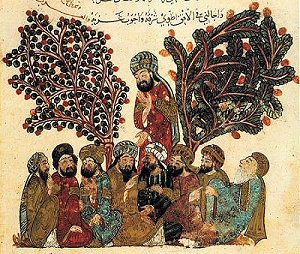
An image from one of the pages of the Maqamat of Badi' al-Zaman al-Hamadhani.

== Modern examples in literature ==
Maqāma as a literary genre has continued to exist and be contributed to since its inception. Mohamed Salah-Omri argues that for the modern Arabic writer, composing maqāmāt or works similar to them may serve as a way of defying Western literary forms and expectations (such as the European novel) and legitimizing their own Arabic identities and that of their reader by appealing to a shared literary history. This process, he argues, would have been especially important in the nineteenth and twentieth centuries as modern Arabic states and national identities began to form as a result of or reaction to European colonialism. Some authors may choose to follow the literary tradition of the genre as closely as possible, while others make use of only some of the features of classical maqāma, to different ends such as parody, entertainment, or colloquialization of the genre. Omri lists the following modern examples of maqāma:

- Majama' al-Bahrayn, (1856) collection by al-Yaziji (d. 1871)
- Hadith Issa ibn hisham (1901) by Muhammad al-Muwahili
- Al-Saq 'ala al-Saq (1855) by Ahmad Faris al-Shidyaq (d. 1887)
- Maqāmāt Bayram al-Tunisi (d. 1961)

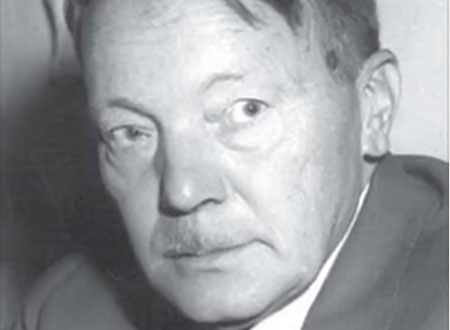
Egyptian poet Bayram al-Tunisi (1893–1961).

In addition to these, many works of modern Arabic literature may only vaguely refer to maqāma or use its narrative structure as a framing device for translations of other works.

== Sources ==
- al-Hamadhani, Badi` al-Zaman. Maqamat. Ed. Muhammad `Abduh. Beirut: al-Maktaba al-kathulikiyya, s.a.
- ---. The Maqamat of Badi' al-zaman al-hamadhani: Translated from the Arabic with an Introduction and Notes. Trans. W. J. Prendergast. London: Curzon Press, 1915.
- al-Hariri, Abu Muhammad al-Qasim ibn `Ali. Maqamat al-Hariri. Ed. `Isa Saba. Beirut: Dar Sadr; Dar Beirut, 1970.
- ---. Sharh Maqamat al-Hariri. Beirut: Dar al-Turath, 1968.
- al-Saraqusti, Abu l-Tahir Muhammad ibn Yusuf. Al-Maqamat al-Luzumiya. Trans. James T. Monroe. Leiden: Brill, 2002.
- ---. Al-Maqamat al-luzumiyah li-l-Saraqusti. Ed. Ibrahim Badr Ahmad Dayf. Alexandria: al-Hay'at al-Misriyat al-'Ammah li-l-Kitab, 2001.
- ---. al-Maqamat al-Luzumiyya. Ed. Hasan al-Waragli. Tetuan: Manšurat `Ukaz, 1995.
- ---. al-Maqamat al-Luzumiyya li'l-Saraqusti. Ed. Ibrahim Badr Ahmad Dayf. Alexandria: al-Hay'a al-Misriyya al-`amma li'l-Kitab, 1982.
- ---. Las sesiones del Zaragocí: Relatos picarescos (maqamat). Trans. Ignacio Ferrando. Saragossa: U Zaragoza P, 1999.
- Arie, R. "Notes sur la maqama andalouse". Hesperis-Tamuda 9.2 (1968): 204–205.
- de la Granja, F. "La maqama de la fiesta de Ibn al-Murabi al-Azdi". Etudes d'Orientalisme Dedieés a la mémoire de Lévi-Provençal. Vol. 2. Paris: Maisonneuve et Larose, 1962. 591603.
- Drory, Rina. "The maqama". The Literature of Al-Andalus. Eds. María Rosa Menocal, Michael Sells and Raymond P. Scheindlin. Cambridge: Cambridge University, 2000. 190–210.
- Habermann, Abraham Meir. "Maqama". EJ.
- Hämeen-Anttila, Jaakko. Maqama: A History of a Genre. Wiesbaden: Harrassovitz, 2002.
- Hamilton, Michelle M. "Poetry and Desire: Sexual and Cultural Temptation in the Hebrew Maqama Tradition". Wine, Women and Song: Hebrew and Arabic Literature of Medieval Iberia. Eds. Michelle M. Hamilton, Sarah J. Portnoy and David A. Wacks. Estudios de Literature Medieval Number: 2: Juan de la Cuesta Hispanic Monographs, Newark, DE, 2004. 59–73.
- Ibn Shabbetai, Judah ben Isaac. "Minhat Yehudah", "'Ezrat ha-nashim" ve-"'En mishpat". Ed. Matti Huss. Vol. 1. 2 vols. Jerusalem: Hebrew University, 1991.
- Ibn Zabara, Joseph ben Meir. Libre d'ensenyaments delectables: Sèfer Xaaixuïm. Trans. *Ignasi González-Llubera. Barcelona: Editorial Alpha, 1931.
- Ignasi González-Llubera. Sepher Shaashuim. Ed. Israel Davidson. New York: Jewish Theological Seminary, 1914.
- Katsumata, Naoya. "The Style of the Maqama: Arabic, Persian, Hebrew, Syriac". Arabic and Middle Eastern Literatures 5.2 (2002): 117–137.
- Mirsky, Aharon. "al-Harizi, Judah ben Solomon". Encyclopaedia Judaica CD-ROM Edition Version 1.0. Ed. Geoffrey Wigoder. Jerusalem: Judaica Multimedia, 1997.
- Wacks, David. "Framing Iberia: Maqamat and Frametale Narratives in Medieval Spain". Leiden: Brill, 2007.
- ---. "The Performativity of Ibn al-Muqaffa''s Kalila wa-Dimna and Al-Maqamat al-Luzumiyya of al-Saraqusti". Journal of Arabic Literature 34.1–2 (2003): 178–189.]
- ---. "Reading Jaume Roig's Spill and the Libro de buen amor in the Iberian maqâma tradition". Bulletin of Spanish Studies 83.5 (2006): 597–616.
- Young, Douglas C. Rogues and Genres: Generic Transformation in the Spanish Picaresque and Arabic Maqama. Newark, DE: Juan de la Cuesta Hispanic Monographs, 2004.
- Young, Douglas C. "Wine and Genre: Khamriyya in the Andalusi Maqama". Wine, Women and Song: Hebrew and Arabic Poetry of Medieval Iberia. Eds. Michelle M. Hamilton, Sarah J. Portnoy and David A. Wacks. Newark, DE: Juan de la Cuesta Hispanic Monographs, 2004.
- Ettinghausen, Richard (1977). La Peinture arabe (in French). Geneva: Skira. pp. 104–124.
- Grabar, Oleg (1984). The Illustrations of the Maqamat (PDF). University of Chicago Press. p. 7.
- Grabar, Oleg. "Maqamat Al-Hariri: Illustrated Arabic Manuscript from the 13th century".
- Hillenbrand, Robert (1 January 2010). "The Schefer Ḥarīrī: A Study in Islamic Frontispiece Design". Arab Painting. pp. 117–134. doi:10.1163/9789004236615_011. ISBN 978-90-04-23661-5.
- Al Maqamat: Beautifully Illustrated Arabic Literary Tradition – 1001 Inventions

== See also ==
- Arabic literature
- Arabic miniature
- Culture of Iraq
- Islamic art
- List of Iraqi artists
- List of Persian-language poets and authors
