= Yahya ibn Mahmud al-Wasiti =

13th-century Iraqi-Arab painter and calligrapher

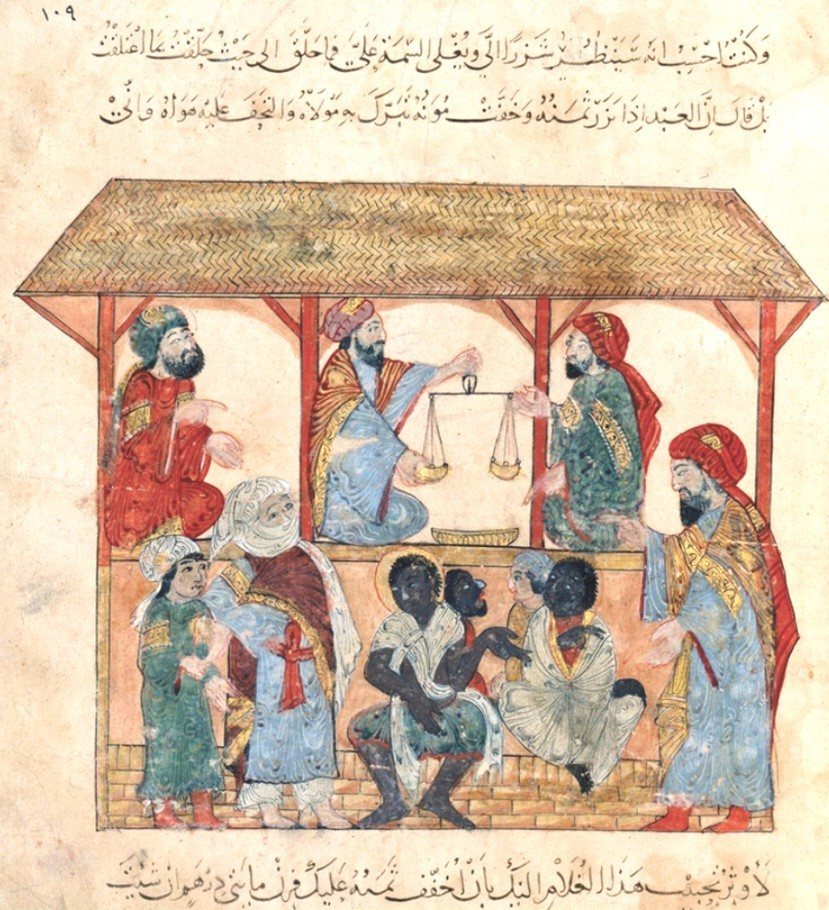
A 13th-century book illustration produced in Baghdad by al-Wasiti showing a slave-market in the town of Zabid in Yemen

Yahya ibn Mahmud al-Wasiti (Arabic: يحيى بن محمود الواسطي) was a 13th-century Iraqi-Arab painter and calligrapher, noted for being the scribe and illustrator of al-Hariri's Maqamat dated 1237 CE (Bibliothèque Nationale de France, Arabe 5847).

== Biography ==
Al-Wasiti was probably born in Wasit, south of Baghdad. In 1237 he transcribed and illustrated a copy of al-Hariri's Maqamat typically shortened to Maqamat, and also known as the Assemblies, a series of anecdotes of social satire written by Al-Hariri of Basra. Al-Wasiti's illustrations, which are among the finest examples of a style used in the 13th-century, served as an inspiration for the modern Baghdad art movement in the 20th-century.

Very little is known about his life. He was from the 13th century school of painting. He was known for his articulate painting style.

== Illustrations from Maqamat ==
In total, Maqmat has 96 illustrations, all by al-Wasiti. They are of "outstanding quality with fine composition, expressive figures, and vivid but controlled colours" and provide readers with "fascinating series of glimpses into and commentaries on 13th-century Islāmic life."

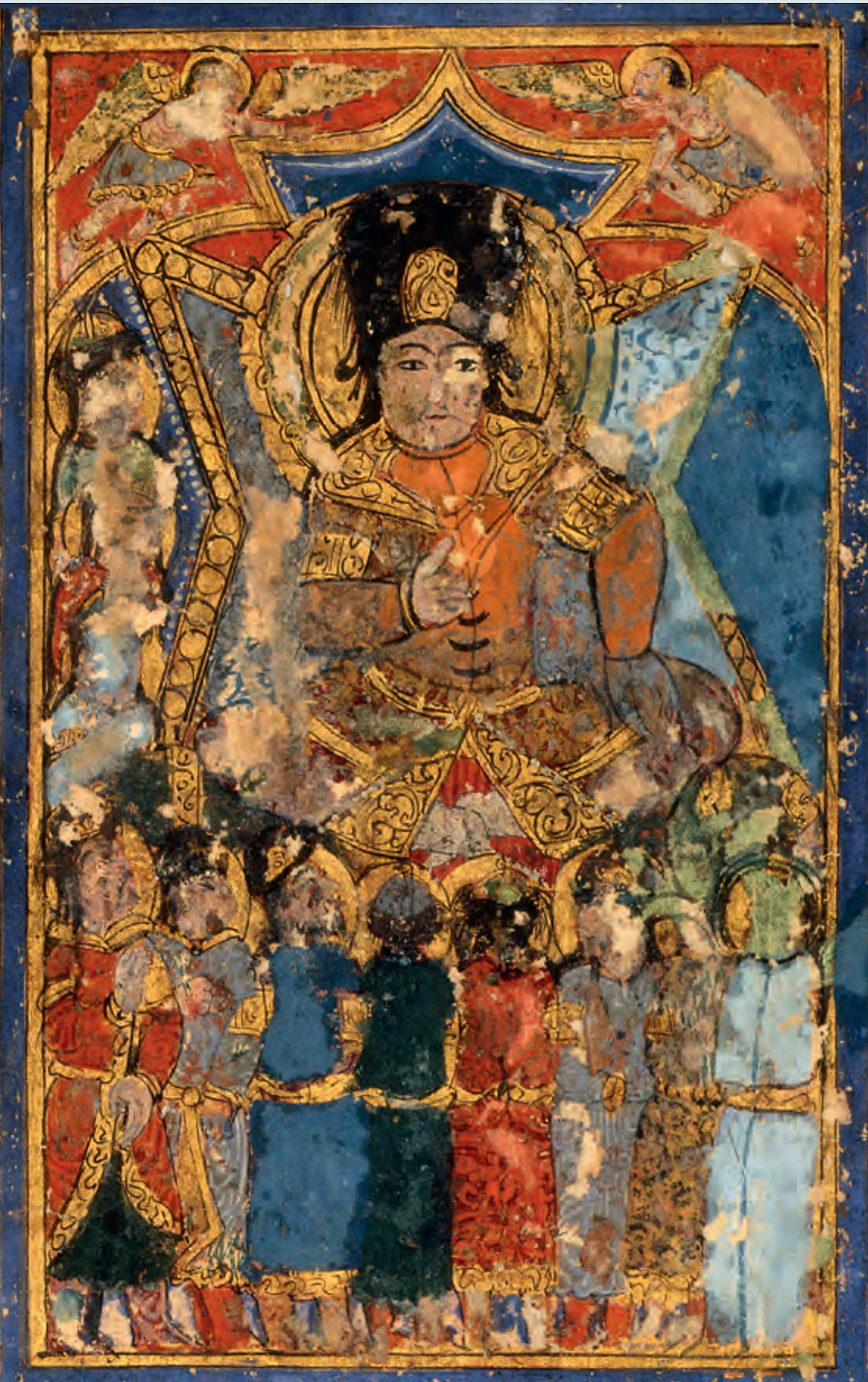
Left frontispiece (1v): ruler in Turkic dress (long braids, Sharbush fur hat, boots, fitting coat), in the Maqamat of al-Hariri, 1237 CE, possibly Baghdad.

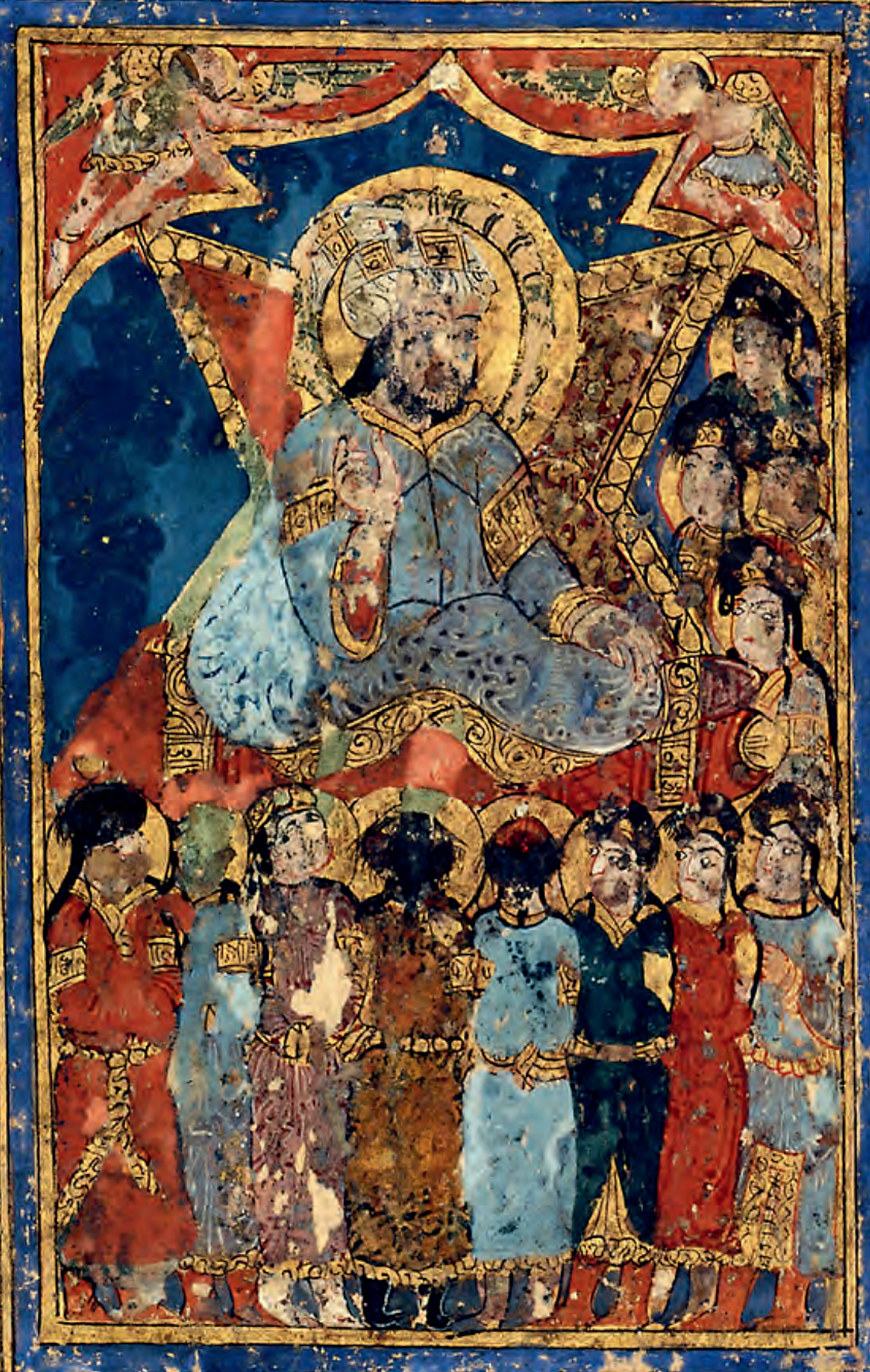
Right frontispiece (2r): possible depiction of the author al-Hariri himself, in the Maqamat of al-Hariri, 1237 CE, possibly Baghdad.

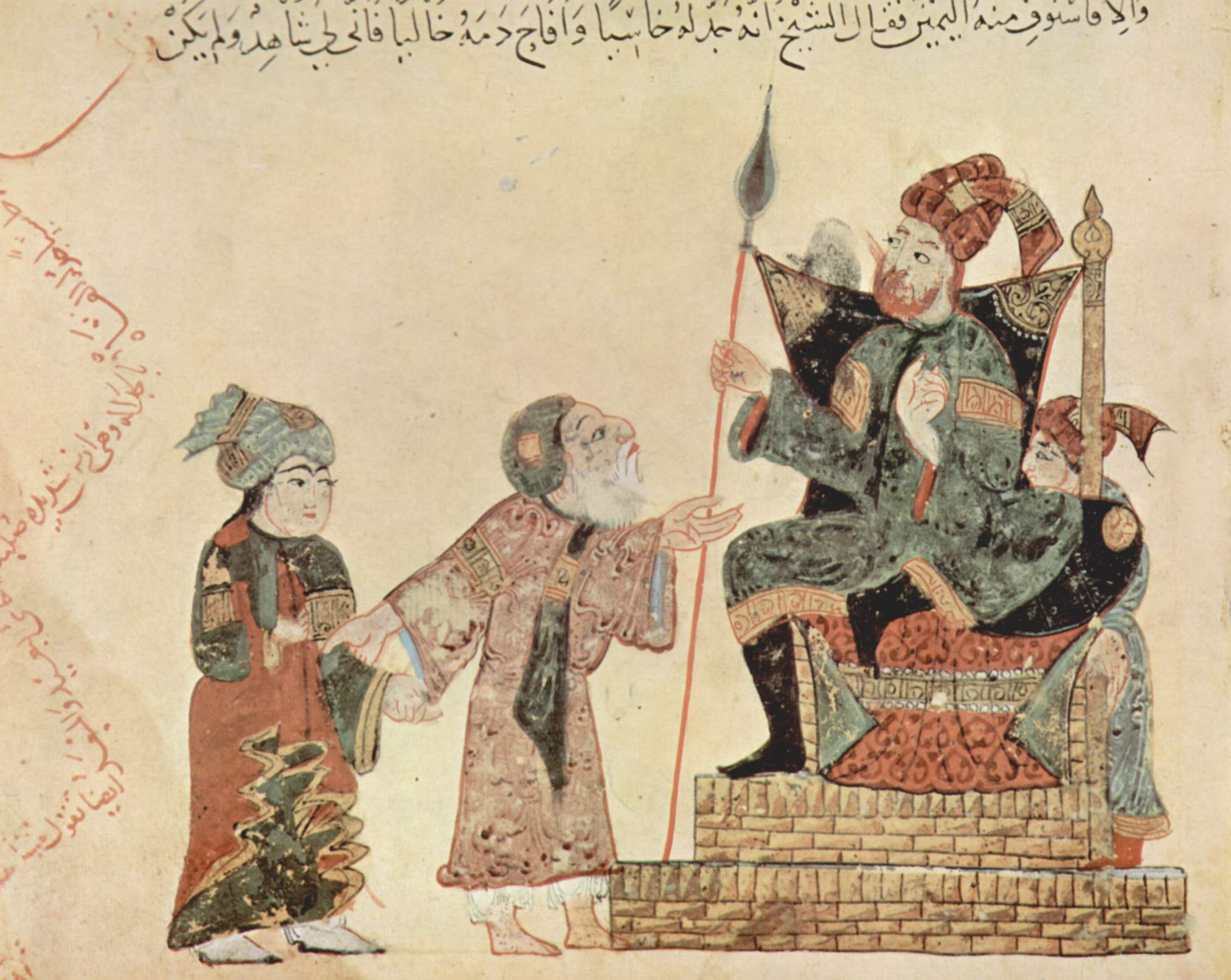
Maqama 10: Ayyubid Governor of Rahba, with Abū Zayd and his son.

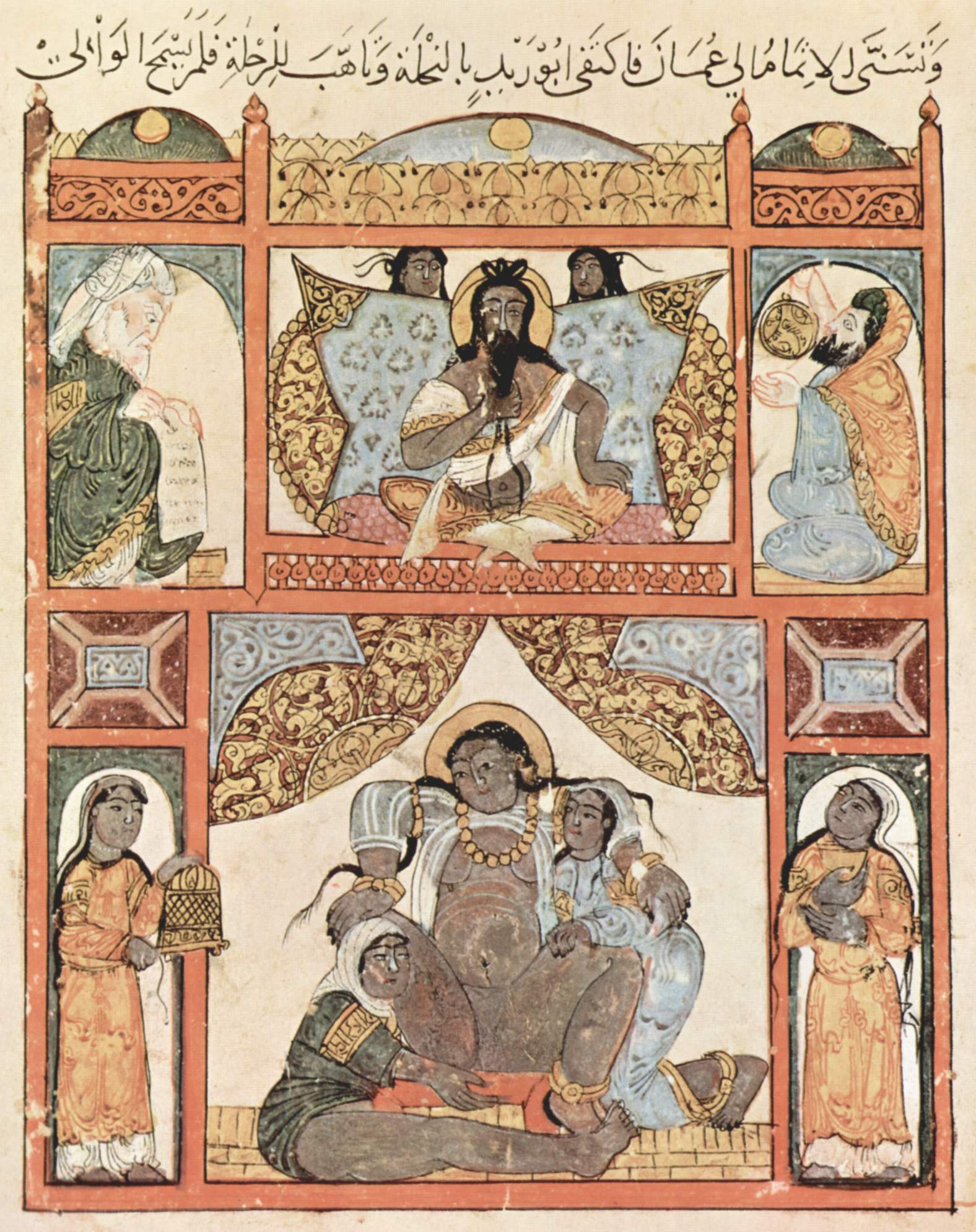
Maqama 39: the Queen of Oman giving birth.

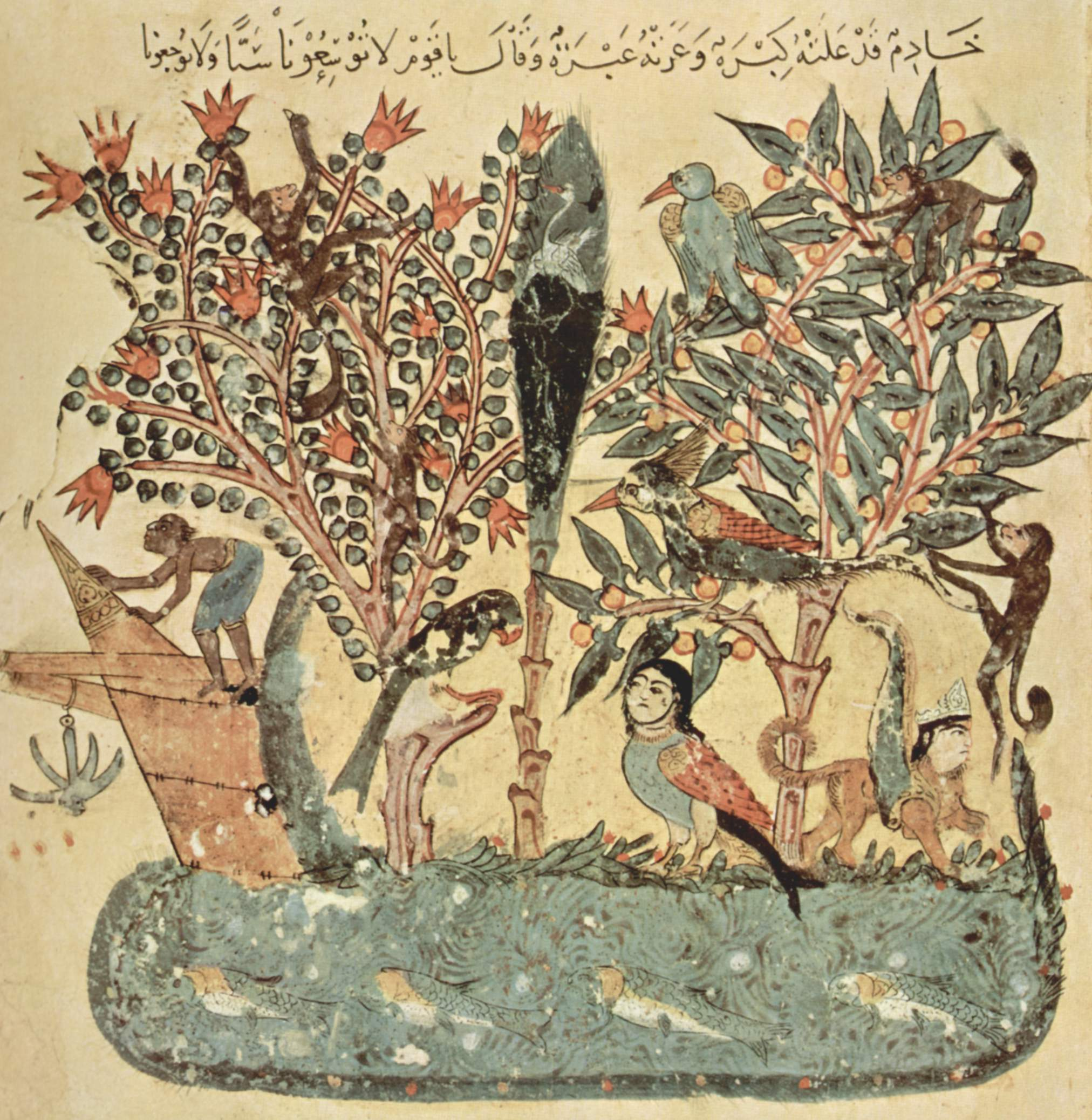

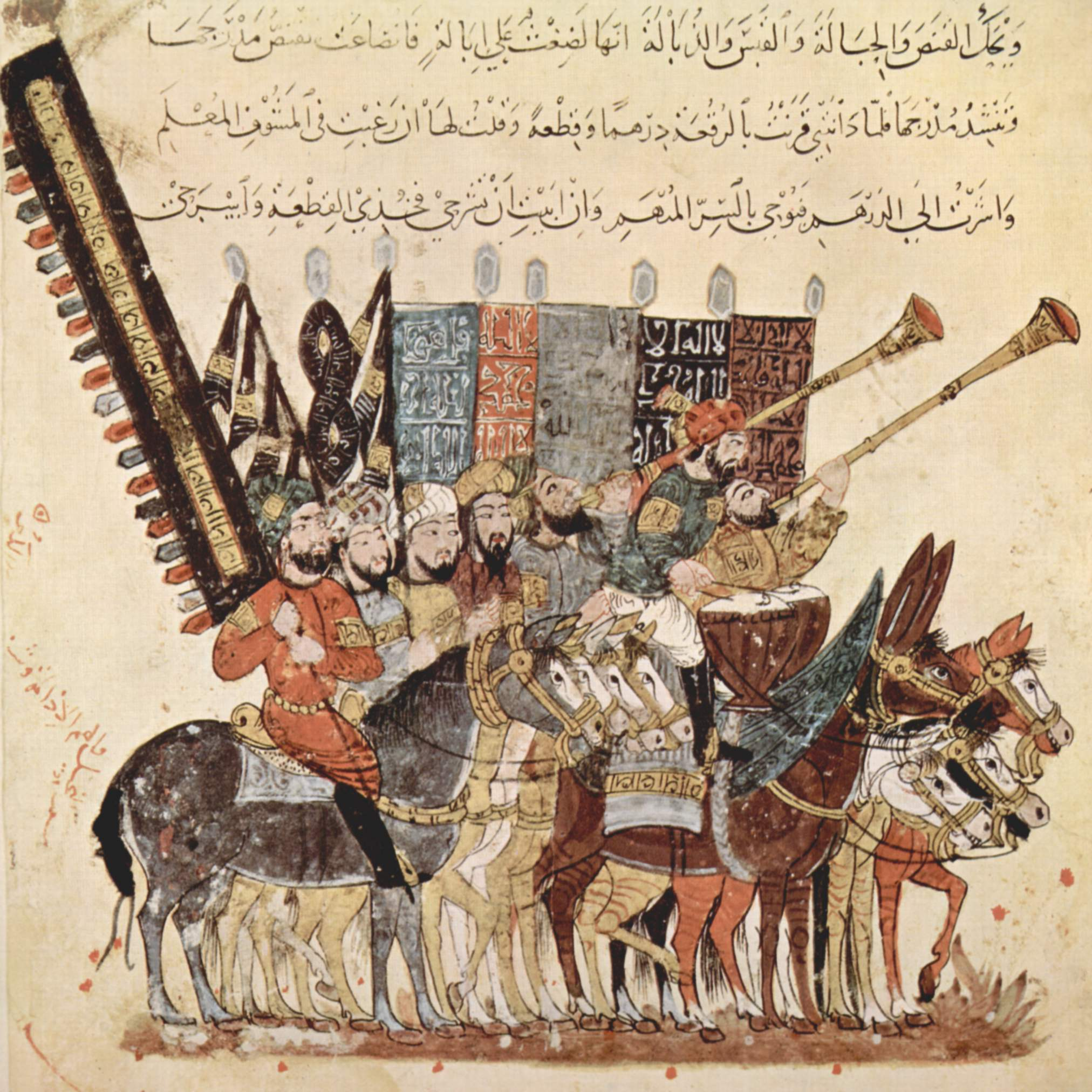

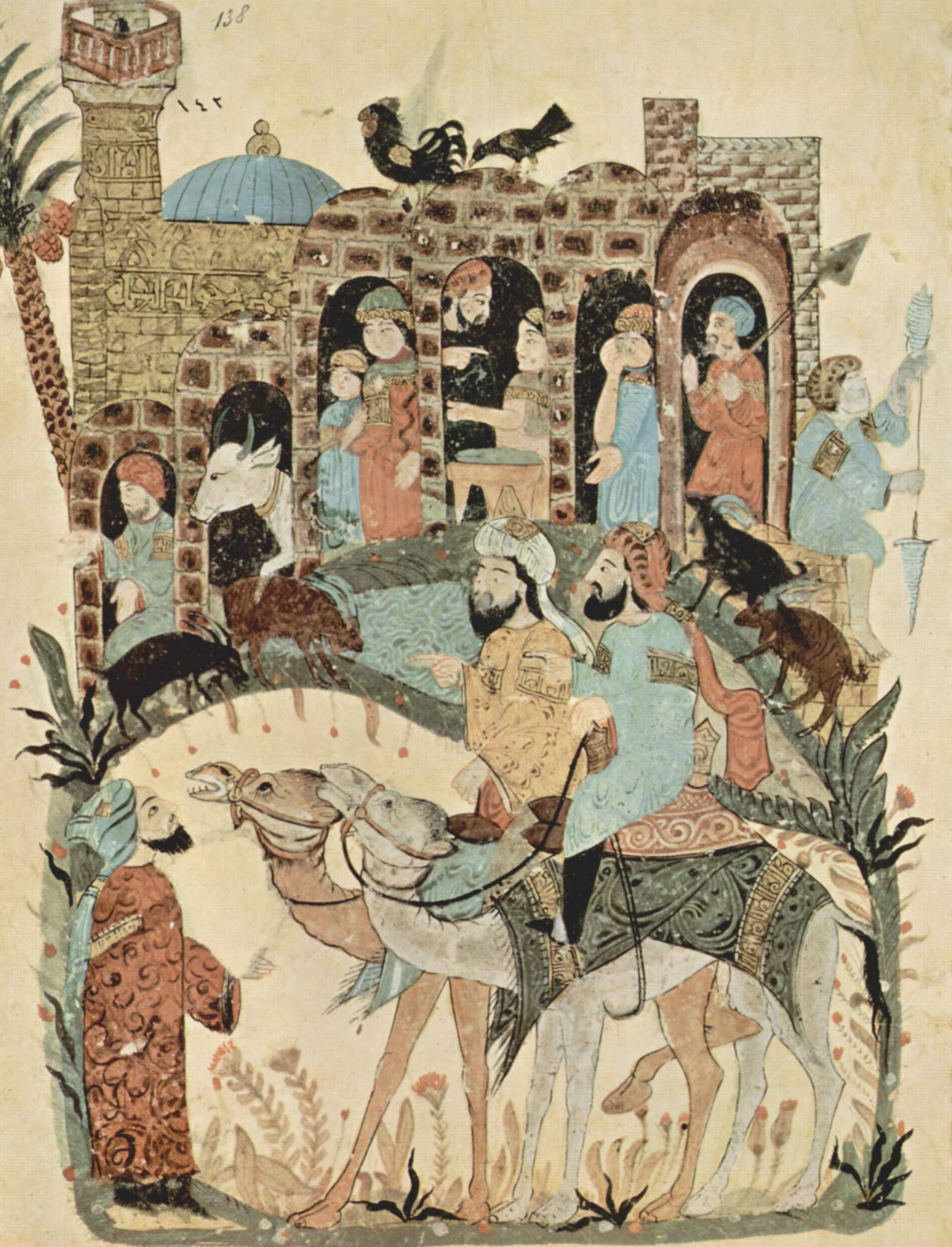

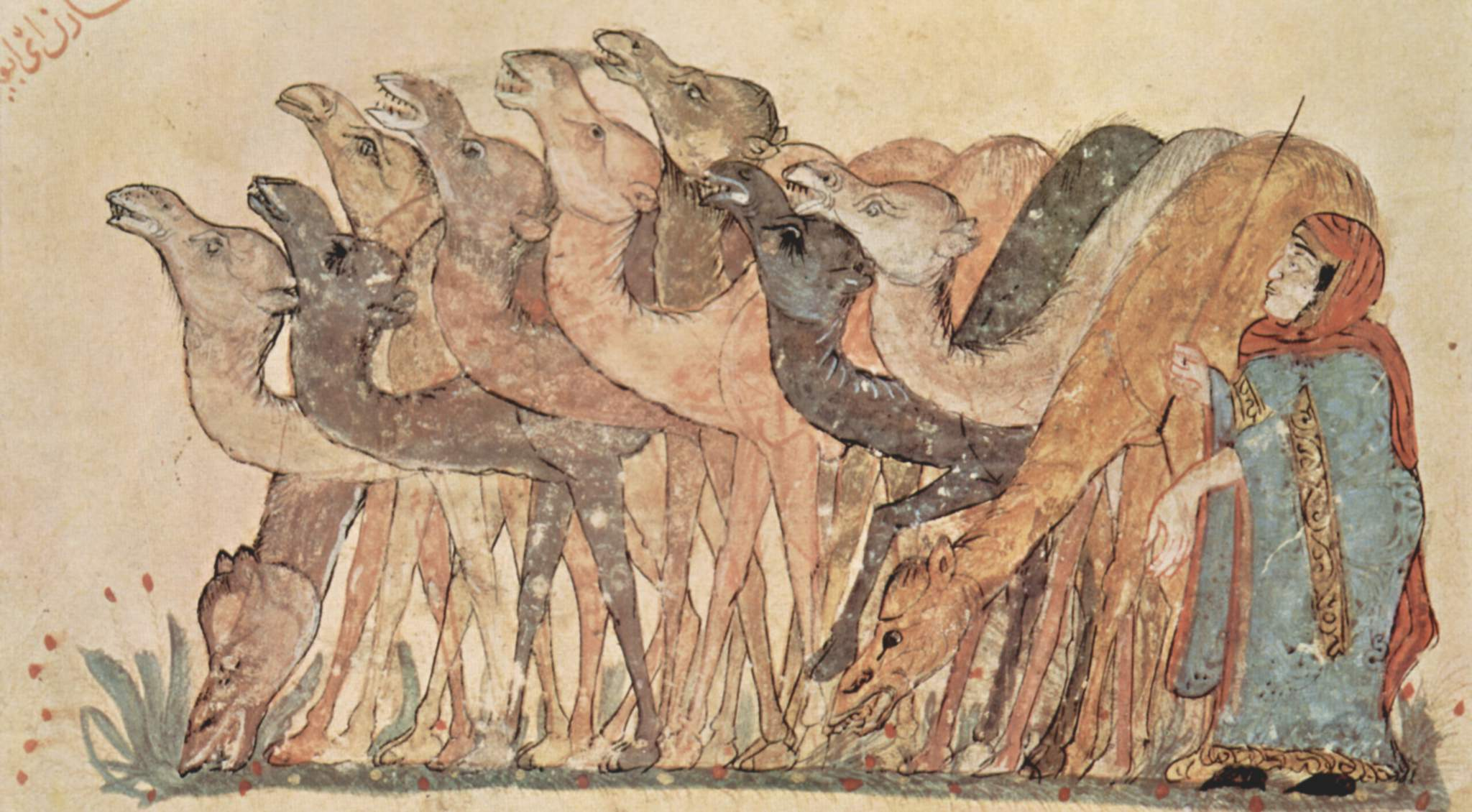

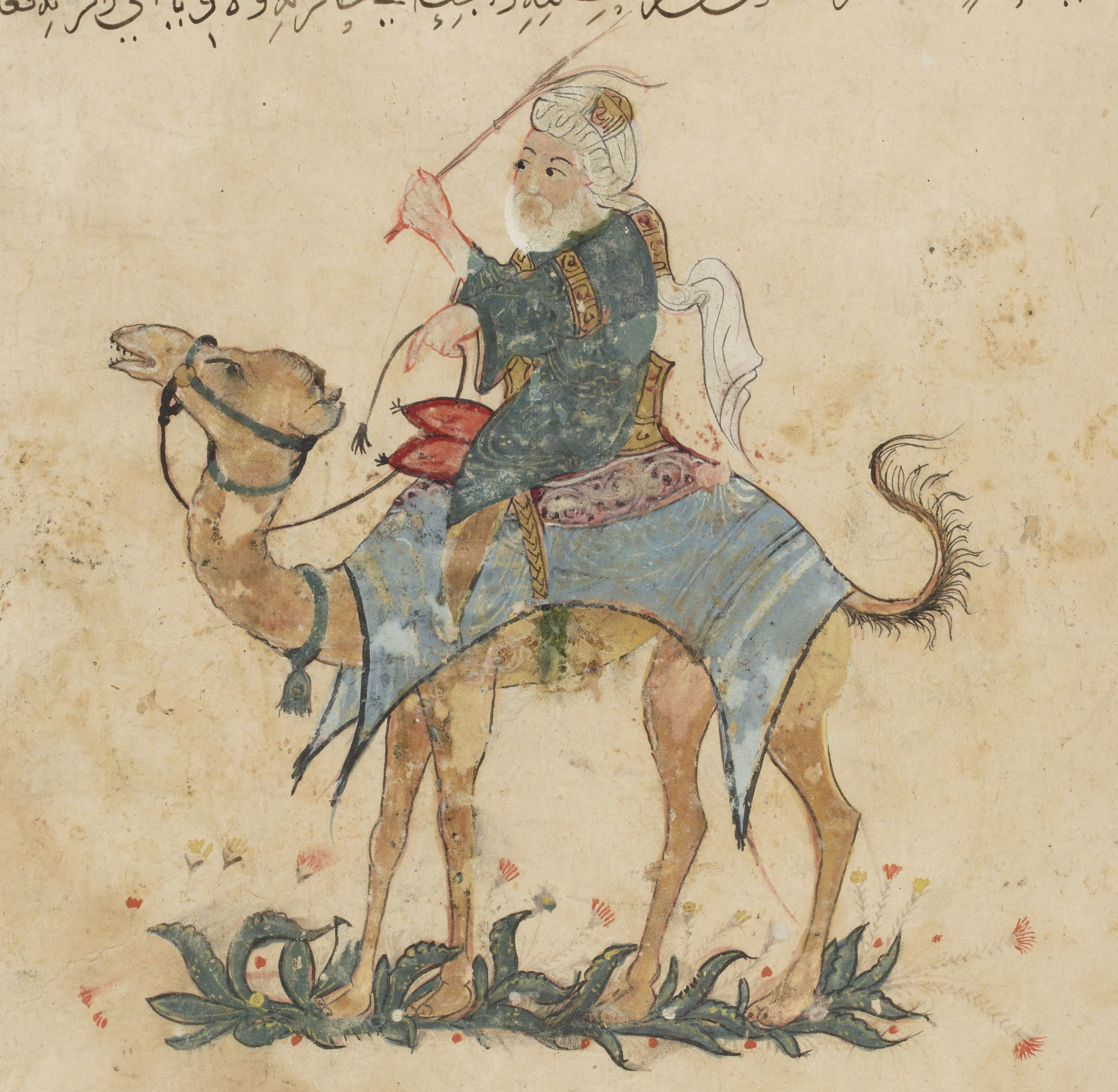

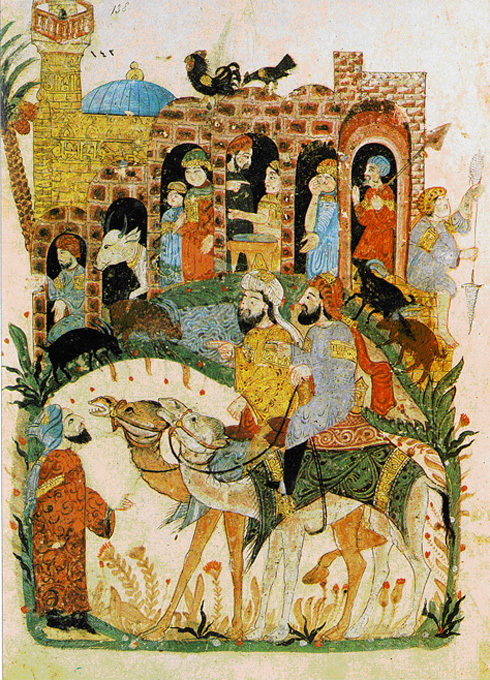

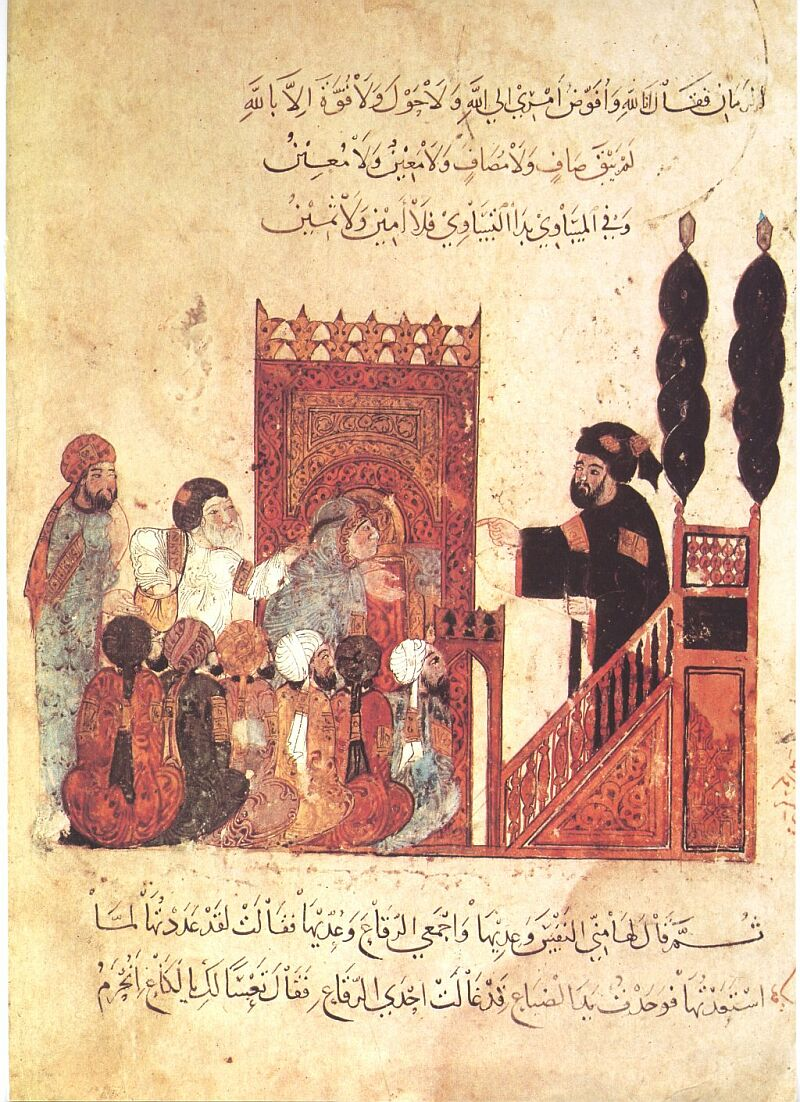

== See also ==
- Arabic literature
- Culture of Iraq
- Islamic art
- List of Iraqi artists

== Sources ==
- Contadini, Anna (1 January 2012). A World of Beasts: A Thirteenth-Century Illustrated Arabic Book on Animals (the Kitāb Na't al-Ḥayawān) in the Ibn Bakhtīshū' Tradition. Brill. doi:10.1163/9789004222656_005.
- Ettinghausen, Richard (1977). La Peinture arabe (in French). Geneva: Skira. pp. 104–124.
  - Translated as Ettinghausen, Richard (1977b). Arab painting. New York : Rizzoli. ISBN 978-0-8478-0081-0.
- Grabar, Oleg (1984). The Illustrations of the Maqamat (PDF). University of Chicago Press. p. 7.
- Grabar, Oleg. "Maqamat Al-Hariri: Illustrated Arabic Manuscript from the 13th century".
- Hillenbrand, Robert (1 January 2010). "The Schefer Ḥarīrī: A Study in Islamic Frontispiece Design". Arab Painting: 117–134. doi:10.1163/9789004236615_011. ISBN 978-90-04-23661-5.
- Shah, Amina (1980). The assemblies of al-Hariri : fifty encounters with the Shaykh Abu Zayd of Seruj. London : Octagon Press. ISBN 978-0-900860-86-7.
- Snelders, B. (2010). Identity and Christian-Muslim interaction : medieval art of the Syrian Orthodox from the Mosul area. Peeters, Leuven.
- Al Maqamat: Beautifully Illustrated Arabic Literary Tradition – 1001 Inventions
