= Joseph Zabara =

Catalan physician and moralist

- Joseph ben Meïr Ibn Zabara
- Born: c. 1140; Barcelona
- Died: c. 1200; Barcelona

Joseph ben Meïr Ibn Zabara (c. 1140 – c. 1200) was a Spanish-Jewish physicist, poet and satirist. Although much of his work has been lost, he is noted as the author of Sefer Sha'ashu'im, or in English, the Book of Delights.

== Life and work ==
Joseph ibn Zabara (1140-1200) was born in Barcelona in 1140 and lived most of his life there. He was educated firstly by his father, Yosef, a physician and later at the Hebrew School of Medicine in Narbonne under Joseph Kimhi, the founder of the prominent Kimhi family. He was also trained in religious thought, philosophy, astronomy and Arabic.

His only known extant work is the Sefer Sha'ashu'im, or in English, the Book of Delight of the maqāmah genre. The two first known manuscripts were published by Isaac Arish in Constantinople in 1577, and one in 15th Century Paris, but the book is thought to have been finished around 1200. It contains a series of stories and fables, modeled after the Kalilah wa-Dimnah. It also bears similarities to Arabian Nights.

Zabara was probably the first to write Hebrew in rhymed prose, with interspersed snatches of verse, a form used by Arabian poets. The book is thought to be semi-autobiographical, and similarities can be seen in the book and Zabara's life. His work in some sections is philogynist, while in other parts he writes misogynist satires. The work is a unique case, it being the earliest known European series of fables and witticisms which were partly of Indian and partly of Greek extraction.

== List of Fables ==
His fables are as listed below:

- The Giant Guest
- The Fox and the Leopard
- The Fox and the Lion
- The Goldsmith who followed his Wife's Counsel
- In Dispraise of Woman
- The Widow and her Husband's Corpse
- The Leopard's Fate
- The Journey Begun by Joseph and Enun
- The Clever Girl and the King's Dream
- The Night's Rest
- The Nobleman and the Necklace
- The Son and the Slave
- The Story of Tobit
- The Paralytic, the Man who Honoured His Father, and He who Adorned the Crucifix
- Table Talk
- The City of Enan
- The Princess and the Rose
- Question and Answer
- Enan Reveals Himself
- Enan's Friend and His Daughter
- The Washerwoman who did the Devil's Work
- Joseph Returns Home to Barcelona
