= Saul Isaac Kaempf =

Austrian-Bohemian rabbi and Orientalist

Saul Isaac Kaempf (born at Lissa, Posen, May 6, 1818; died at Prague October 16, 1892) was an Austrian-Bohemian rabbi and Orientalist.

== Life ==
He received his first lessons from his father, Aaron Jacob Kaempf, a Talmudic scholar, and then entered the gymnasium at Berlin and continued the study of the Talmud under E. Rosenstein. In 1836 he returned to Posen and studied under Akiba Eger.

Four years later he entered the University of Halle, took up philosophy and philology, and became one of the favorite pupils of Gesenius. He received the degree of Ph. D. and his rabbinical diploma, and accepted a call to Mecklenburg-Strelitz as teacher and preacher, in the same year (1844). Two years later he was called to Prague as preacher of the Temple Congregation, succeeding Michael Sachs; he remained there until his retirement in 1890. In 1850 Kaempf became privat-docent in Semitic languages at the University of Prague, his dissertation being Ueber die Bedeutung des Studiums der Semitischen Sprachen (Prague, 1850); eight years later he was appointed assistant professor of Oriental languages at the same university.

== Works ==
Kaempf was a prolific writer. His works include:

- "Biographie des Hochberühmten Hochseligen Herrn Akiba Eger, Oberrabbiner zu Posen, Nebst einem Hebräischen Trauergedicht" (with other Hebrew and German poems, Lissa, 1838)
- "Die ersten Makamen aus dem Tachkemoni oder Divan des Charisi" (Berlin, 1845)
- "Simrath Jah: Gottesdienstliches Gesangbuch, eingeführt im Israelitischen Tempel zu Prag" (Prague, 1849)
- "Nichtandalusische Poesie andalusischer Dichter aus dem elften, zwölften und dreizehnten Jahrhundert. Ein Beitrag zur Geschichte der Poesie des Mittelalters" (vol. ii. printed under the title "Zehn Makamen aus dem Tachkemoni, oder Divan des Charisi," ib. 1858)
- "Suleiman: Dramatisches Gedicht" (ib. 1859)
- "Mamtik Sod: Beleuchtung des Frankelschen Werkes 'Hodegetik zur Mischna' in Dogmatischer Beziehung," a defense of Frankel in his controversy with S. R. Hirsch (ib. 1861)
- "Die Inschrift auf dem Denkmal Mesa's, König von Moab" (ib. 1870)
- "Phönizische Epigraphik: Die Grabschrift Eschmunazars, Königs der Sidonier" (ib. 1874)
- "Das Hohelied ins Deutsche Uebertragen" (ib. 1877).

His collection of prayers for Jewish holidays and festivals, according to the ritual of the Temple Congregation of Prague (ib. 1854; also translated), has been frequently republished. In cooperation with Ludwig Philippson and W. Landau he edited the Bible for the Jewish Bible Society.

In addition to many single sermons delivered at celebrations and on various special occasions, several treatises of larger scope were contributed by him to various periodicals: "Ueber die Vorstellung der Alten Hebräer von der Unsterblichkeit der Seele" (in "Orient, Lit." 1842, Nos. 7-27); "Ueber Spinoza's Theologisch Politischen Traktat" (ib. 1842, Nos. 34-47); "Hillel der Aeltere" (ib. 1849).
