= Yehuda Alharizi =

Andalusian rabbi, translator and poet (f. 12th century)

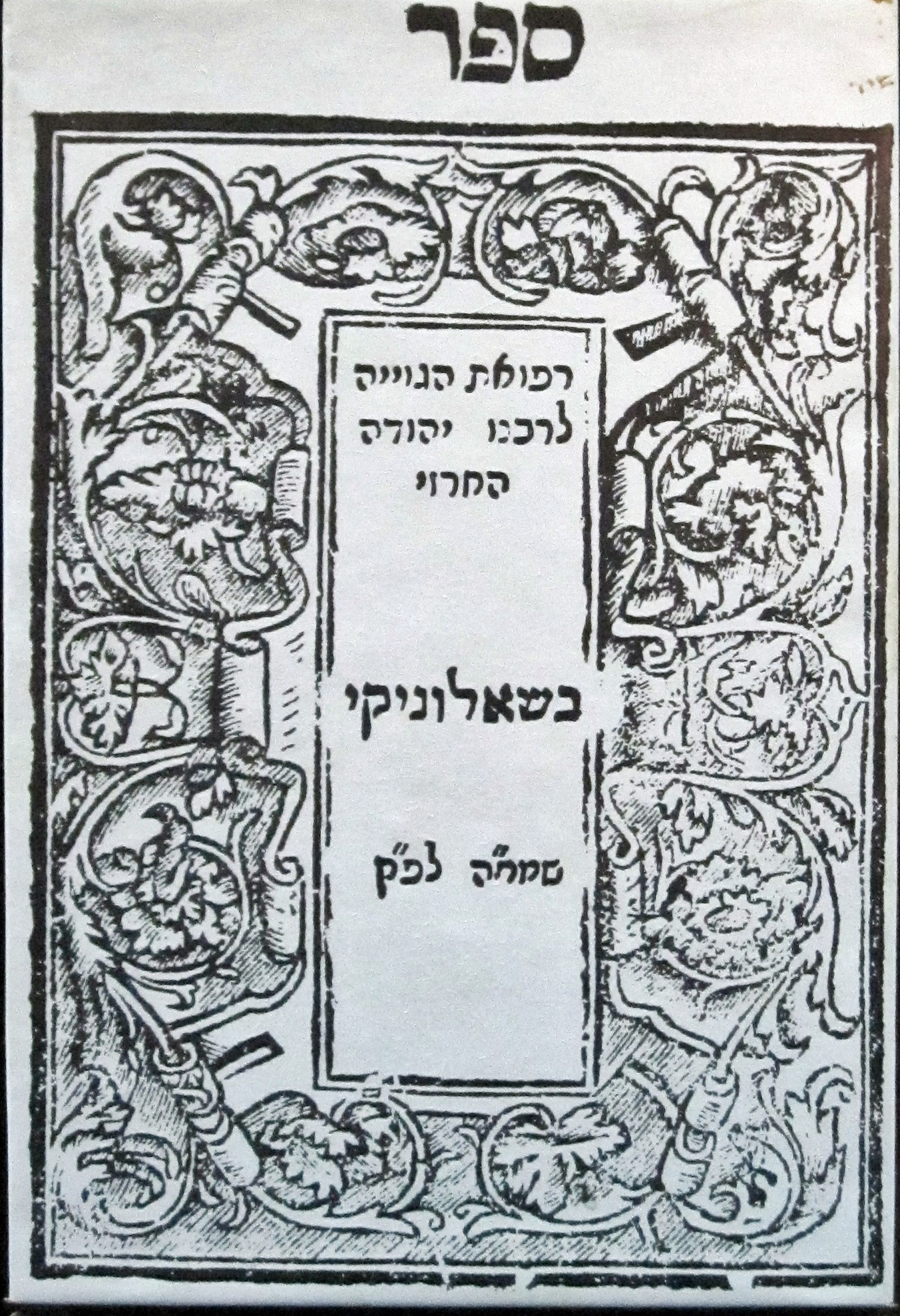
Sefer Refu'at Hageviyah by Judah Al Harizi

Yehuda Alharizi, also Judah ben Solomon Harizi or al-Harizi (Hebrew: יהודה בן שלמה אלחריזי, romanized: Yehudah ben Shelomo al-Harizi, Arabic: يحيا بن سليمان بن شاؤل أبو زكريا الحريزي اليهودي من أهل طليطلة, romanized: Yaḥyà bin Sulaymān bin Shāʾul abū Zakarya al-Harizi al-Yahūdī min ahl Ṭulayṭila), was a rabbi, translator, poet, and traveler active in al-Andalus (mid-12th century Toledo, Spain? – 1225 in Aleppo, Ayyubid Syria). He was supported by wealthy patrons, to whom he wrote poems and dedicated compositions. He is known for his collection of tales, Sefer Tahkemoni (ספר תחכמוני), sometimes known as the 'Hebrew Maqamat,' which is in the form of a maqama.

== Life ==
Yehuda al-Harizi was born in Toledo in the mid-12th century to a family originally from Jerez and was educated in Castile. An Arabic biographer and a contemporary, Ibn al-Sha’ar al-Mawsili (1197–1256), provided the only known physical description of al-Harizi: "a tall silver-haired man with a smooth face".

As was the practice for educated men of the period, he traveled extensively throughout the region, visiting Jewish communities and various centres of learning across the Mediterranean and the East. He was disappointed by the poor quality of Hebrew learning across the region.

He translated many Arabic works into Hebrew, including Maimonides' The Guide for the Perplexed and al-Hariri's Maqamat.

In addition to the many translations, he also produced original works in Hebrew and in Arabic. He wrote a book of his travels, al-rawada al-‘arniqa. He also composed an original maqama in Hebrew, with the title of Sefer Tahkemoni. His Maqama imitated the structure of Badi' al-Zaman al-Hamadani and al-Hariri, but his work also reflects his Jewish identity in a society that was in transition, shifting from al-Andalus to Christian Iberia. He is generally regarded as one of the great classical Jewish authors.

He died in Aleppo, Syria in 1225.

== Work ==
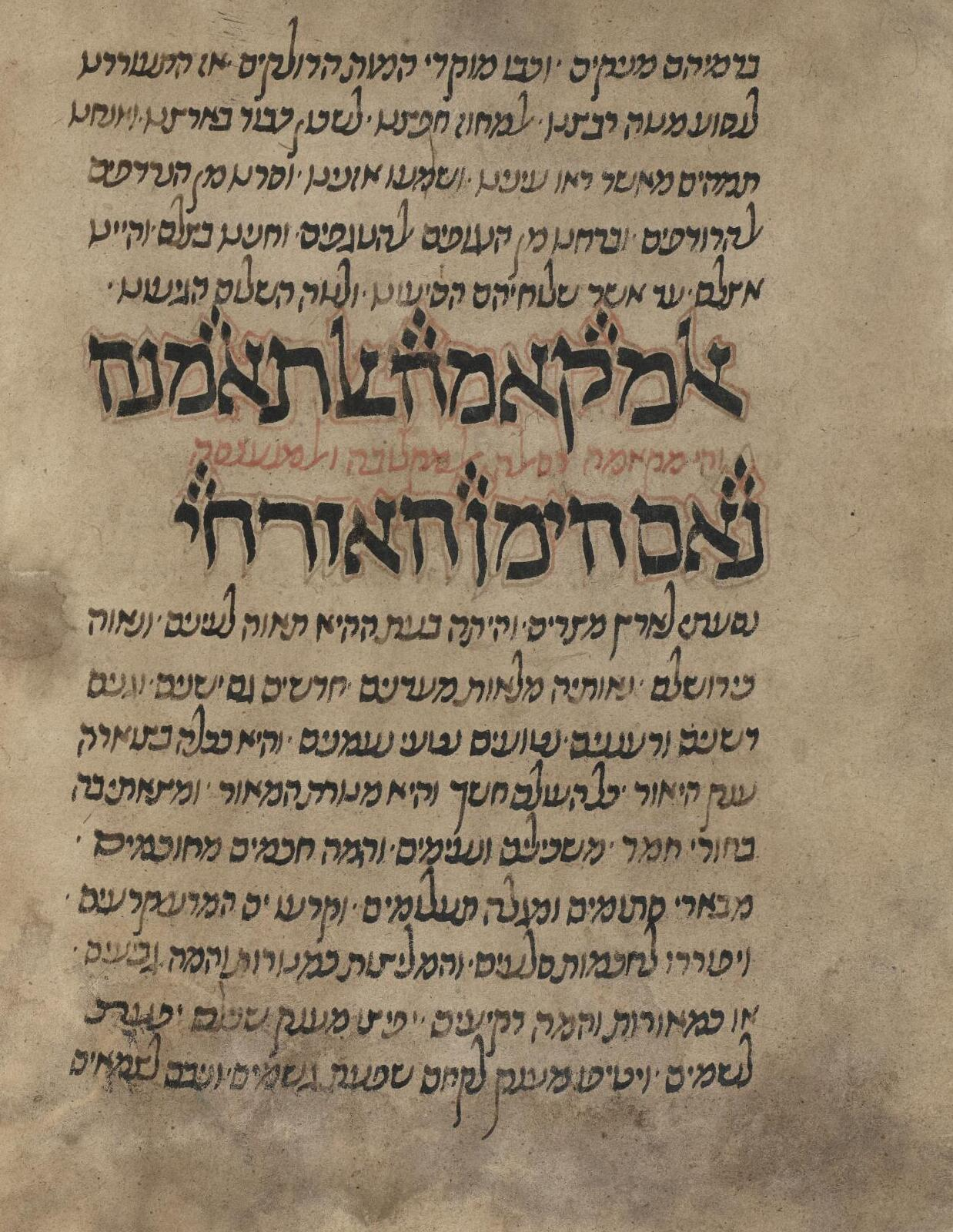
14th-15th century manuscript of Taḥkemoni

Alharizi was a rationalist, conveying the works of Maimonides and his approach to rationalistic Judaism. He translated Maimonides' The Guide for the Perplexed and some of his Commentary on the Mishnah, as well as the Mahbarot Iti'el of the Arab poet al-Hariri, from the Arabic to Hebrew.

Alharizi's poetic translation of the Guide for the Perplexed is considered by many to be more readable than that of Samuel ibn Tibbon. However, it has not been very widely used in Jewish scholarship, perhaps because it is less precise. It had some influence in the Christian world due to its translation into Latin.

Alharizi's own works include the Tahkemoni, composed between 1218 and 1220, in the Arabic form known as maqama. This is written in Hebrew in unmetrical rhymes, in what is commonly termed rhymed prose. It is a series of humorous episodes, witty verses, and quaint applications of Scriptural texts. The episodes are bound together by the presence of the hero and of the narrator, who is also the author. Another collection of his poetry was devoted to preaching ethical self-discipline and fear of heaven.

Alharizi undertook long journeys in the lands of the Middle East. His works are suffused with his impressions from these journeys.

He not only brought to perfection the art of applying Hebrew to secular satire, but he was also a brilliant literary critic and his maqama on the Andalusian Hebrew poets is a fruitful source of information.

=== Editions and translations ===
- Iudae Harizii macamae, ed. by Paulus Lagarde (Göttingen: Hoyer, 1883).
- Hebrew: תחכמוני / יהודה אלחריזי ; הכין לדפוס לפי מהדורות שונות, י. טופורובסקי ; הקדים מבוא, ישראל זמורה. (Tahkemoni), ed. Toporowski (Tel Aviv: Maḥbarot le-sifrut, 1952)
- The Tahkemoni of Judah al-Harizi, trans. by Victor Emanuel Reichert, 2 vols (Jerusalem: Cohen, 1965–1973)
- The Book of Tahkemoni: Jewish Tales from Medieval Spain, trans. by David Simha Segal
- 1899 edition of Tahkemoni in Hebrew
- Tahkemoni in Hebrew, Istanbul 1578
- Saul Isaac Kaempf, Nichtandalusische Poesie andalusischer Dichter aus dem elften, zwölften und dreizehnten Jahrhundert: Ein Beitrag zur Geschichte der Poesie des Mittelalters, vol. 1 (Prague: Bellmann, 1858) (here a considerable section of the Tahkemoni is translated into German).
- Moses Gaster Hebrew MS 95, John Rylands Library, 14th-15th century Hebrew and Judeo-Arabic manuscript scanned folios, "Hebrew Manuscripts : Taḥkemoni by Judah ben Solomon al-Harizi". Manchester Digital Collections.

== Literature on Alharizi's influence in the Christian world ==
- Kluxen, Wolfgang (1951). Untersuchung und Texte zur Geschichte des lateinischen Maimonides. Diss. Köln.
- Kluxen, Wolfgang (1954). "Literargeschichtliches zum lateinischen Moses Maimonides". Recherches de Théologie Ancienne et Médiévale. 21: 23–50. ISSN 1370-7493.
- Kluxen, Wolfgang (1966). "Rabbi Moyses (Maimonides): Liber de uno Deo benedicto". Misc. Med. 4: 167–182.
- Kluxen, Wolfgang (1966). "Die Geschichte des Maimonides im lateinischen Abendland". Misc. Med. 4: 146–166.
- Vajda, George (1960). "Un abregé chrétien du 'Guide des égarés´". JAS. 248: 115–136.
- Hasselhoff, Görge K. (2004). Dicit Rabbi Moyses. Studien zum Bild von Moses Maimonides im lateinischen Westen vom 13. bis 15. Jahrhundert. Würzburg: Königshausen & Neumann. ISBN 3-8260-2692-6.
