= One Thousand and One Nights =

Collection of Middle Eastern folk tales

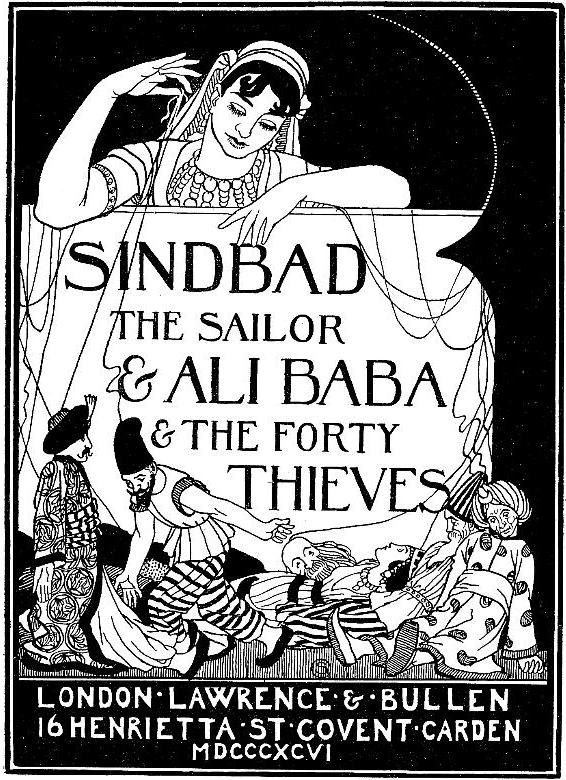
- Sindbad the sailor and Ali Baba and the forty thieves by William Strang, 1896
- Language: Arabic
- Genre: Frame story folklore
- Set in: Middle Ages
- Text: One Thousand and One Nights at Wikisource

One Thousand and One Nights or The Thousand and One Nights (Arabic: ألف ليلة وليلة) is a collection of Middle Eastern folktales compiled in the Arabic language during the Islamic Golden Age. It is often known in English as The Arabian Nights, from the first English-language edition (c. 1706–1721), which rendered the title as The Arabian Nights' Entertainments.

There is no canonical text of the Nights. The Nights have a long history, as many of the tales that comprise the Nights were collected over many centuries by various authors, translators, and scholars across West Asia, Central Asia, South Asia, and North Africa. Some tales trace their roots back to ancient and medieval Persian, Arabic, and Mesopotamian literature. Most tales, however, were originally folk stories from the Abbasid and Mamluk eras, while others, especially the frame story, are drawn from the Pahlavi Persian work Hezār Afsān (Persian: هزار افسان, lit. 'A Thousand Tales'), which in turn relied partly on Indian elements.

Printed editions of the Nights have some things in common, including the story's framing device. In the frame story, the ruler Shahryar is told the tales by his wife Scheherazade, with one tale told over each night of storytelling. The stories proceed from this original tale; some are framed within other tales, while some are self-contained. Some editions contain only a few hundred nights of storytelling, while others include 1001 or more. Most of the text is prose, with some verse for songs, riddles, and heightened emotion. These poems are usually short, either single couplets or quatrains.

Some popular stories in the Arabian Nights today—particularly "Aladdin and the Wonderful Lamp" and "Ali Baba and the Forty Thieves"—were not included in earlier Arabic versions. These were added after Syrian writer Hanna Diyab told these stories to the translator Antoine Galland in 1709. Other stories, such as "The Seven Voyages of Sinbad the Sailor", existed independently before their inclusion in later manuscripts and translations.

== Synopsis ==
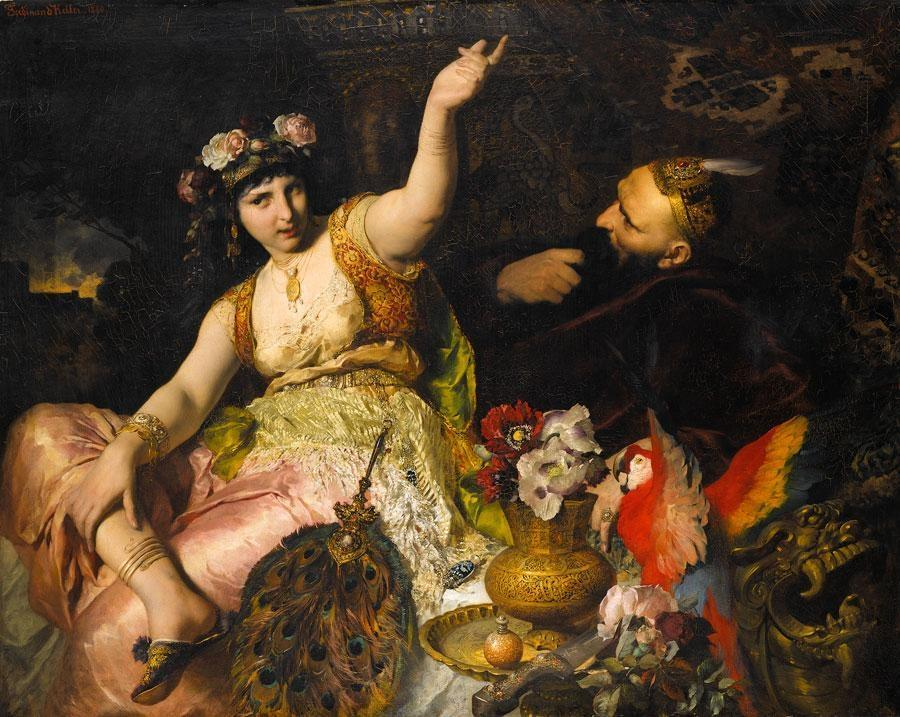
Scheherazade and Shahryar by Ferdinand Keller, 1880

=== The Frame Story ===
The frame story begins with Shâhzamân, the King of Samarkand and brother of Shahriyâr, another king who ruled an empire that stretched from Persia to India.. As Shâhzamân prepares to leave his palace to visit his brother, he remembers that he's left something inside his own palace. When he returns to retrieve it, he learns that his wife has been having sex with a black cook in their own bed. He kills them both, then leaves for his brother's court.

There, Shâhzamân discovers that his brother's own wife, as well as his numerous slave girls, have been engaging in secret orgies with black slaves. He improves his humour and shares his discovery with his brother In bitterness and grief, both brothers abandon the kingdom to roam the world. While roaming, they see a jinn. They hide and see that the jinn is carrying a chest, where he keeps a captive woman. The jinn goes to sleep, and the woman discovers the brothers. She threatens to awaken the dangerous jinn unless they have sex with her. Then, she takes their royal rings as tokens and shows them her large collection of rings, given to her by other one-time lovers.

The brothers decide that the jinn is even more miserable than them and return to their kingdoms. Shahriyâr kills his wife and the slaves. In his bitterness, he decides that all women are the same. Shahriyâr begins to marry a new virgin every day, only to execute each one the next morning, before she has a chance to dishonor him.

Eventually, the Vizier, whose duty it is to provide them, cannot find any more virgins. Scheherazade, the vizier's daughter, offers herself as the next bride. On the night of their marriage, Scheherazade asks the king to have her sister Dinarzad join her. Then Dinarzad asks her sister to tell one of her wonderful stories. Scheherazade start telling one tale (The Fisherman and the jinni), but does not end it before the morning arrives. The king, curious about how the story ends, postpones her execution in order to hear the conclusion. The next night, as soon as she finishes the tale, she begins another one, and the king, eager to hear the conclusion of that tale as well, postpones her execution once again. This goes on for one thousand and one nights, hence the name.

=== The Tales ===
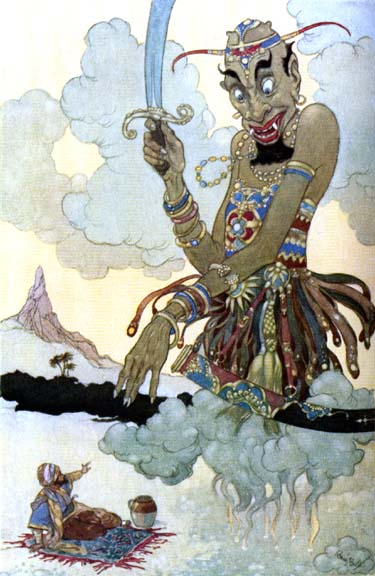
1898 illustration of The Fisherman and the Jinni by René Bull

The number and order of the stories varies from manuscript to manuscript, to edition and edition and from translation to translation. Over 550 tales from various genres have been included in editions of the Nights.

The tales include historical tales, love stories, tragedies, comedies, poems, burlesques, and various forms of erotica. Extraordinary or fantasical elements such as jinn, ghouls, ape people, sorcerers, magicians, and legendary places intermingle with real people and locations. Real-life characters include the historical Abbasid caliph Harun al-Rashid, his Grand Vizier, Jafar al-Barmaki, and the famous poet Abu Nuwas, despite the fact that these figures lived some 200 years after the fall of the Sassanid Empire, in which the frame tale of Scheherazade is set. Some tales even present late medieval rulers as Baybars or Timur, or go into mythic pre-Islamic time. Sometimes a character in Scheherazade's tale will begin telling other characters a story of their own, and that story may have another one told within it, resulting in a richly layered narrative texture.

=== Conclusion ===
Different variants of the conclusion agree that the king Shahriyâr gave his wife Scheherazade a pardon at the end and spared her life. They differ in the details:

- After a thousand nights, Scheherazade gave birth to a child and presented it to her husband, explaining the stratagem she had employed to save her life. The king admired her undertaking, became attached to her, and decided to spare her. Dinarzad, the king's qahramāna (female steward), had assisted the queen in carrying out her plan. (According to the earliest known summary, recorded by Ibn al-Nadīm in his tenth-century Fihrist.)
- During the 1001 nights, Scheherazade bore the king three children. (The standard ending found in the nineteenth-century printed editions of the ZER recension.)
- After the story of Maruf the Cobbler, King Shahriyār grew tired of Scheherazade's storytelling and ordered her execution for the following morning. Scheherazade therefore sent for their three children and asked the king to spare her life, a request he granted. (According to Von Hammer's ZER manuscript, dating from the early nineteenth century)
- After Scheherazade had finished telling all the stories she knew, Shahriyār recognized her intelligence and resourcefulness. Since she had also borne him two children, he decided to spare her life. The following morning, he bestowed numerous favors upon her father, the vizier. They all continued to live together until their deaths. (According to the so-called Mystified Sabbagh Manuscript, dating from the early nineteenth century.)
- Some manuscripts said to be "complete" contain no ending sequence at all. (Like the Wortley Montague Manuscript, dating from the eighteenth century.)
- A more elaborate ending depicts Scheherazade gradually reforming the king through stories that encourage him to reflect on his own circumstances and question whether executing his former wives had been justified. After the final story cycle (Baybars and the Sixteeen Captains of Police, or The Craft and Malice of women) Scheherazade begins recounting the frame story of the Nights itself, presenting it to the king in a modified form and without mentioning the characters' names. Shahriyār eventually recognizes that the story mirrors his own and acknowledges that he deserved God's punishment for his actions. He thanks God for sending Scheherazade to guide him back to the right path. Scheherazade then instructs him on the relationship between a ruler and his army, as well as between a ruler and his subjects. She also relates two additional stories about unfaithful concubines, demonstrating to the king that his predicament was not unique and that other kings had experienced similar situations. Fully convinced of his wrongdoing and of Scheherazade's unparalleled wisdom, the king arranges a splendid double wedding: he marries Scheherazade, while his brother, Shāhzamān, marries Dinarzad.(Shāhzamān had been wedding and killing girls as well) Scheherazade's tales are subsequently compiled into a book entitled One Thousand and One Nights. (According to the Kayseri family of manuscripts, dating from the sixteenth to eighteenth centuries, and the Breslau edition. Galland is also thought to have heard of this ending.)
- After the tale of Harun ar-Rashid and The Merchant of Oman, Scheherazade begins recounting the frame story. In this embedded tale, the "unnamed queen" had been pregnant three times, although the "unnamed king was unaware of the pregnancies.When the king asks to see his sons, they are brought before him. The narrative then returns to Scheherazade and Shahriyār. Scheherazade explains that a woman's worth lies in her intelligence and faith, and asks her sister Dinarzad to bring her three children before the king. Shahriyār is delighted to see them. (According to the late Reinhardt Manuscript, dating from the nineteenth century).

== History, versions and translations ==
There is no single canonical text of the Nights with a fixed number of stories in a fixed order. The text's history is complex. Scholars have made many attempts to untangle how extant collections came about. Robert Irwin summarises their findings:

In the 1880s and 1890s a lot of work was done on the Nights by Zotenberg and others, in the course of which a consensus view of the history of the text emerged. Most scholars agreed that the Nights was a composite work and that the earliest tales in it came from India and Persia. At some time, probably in the early eighth century, these tales were translated into Arabic under the title Alf Layla, or 'The Thousand Nights'. This collection then formed the basis of The Thousand and One Nights. The original core of stories was quite small. Then, in Iraq in the ninth or tenth century, this original core had Arab stories added to it—among them some tales about the Caliph Harun al-Rashid. Also, perhaps from the tenth century onwards, previously independent sagas and story cycles were added to the compilation [...] Then, from the 13th century onwards, a further layer of stories was added in Syria and Egypt, many of these showing a preoccupation with sex, magic or low life. In the early modern period yet more stories were added to the Egyptian collections so as to swell the bulk of the text sufficiently to bring its length up to the full 1,001 nights of storytelling promised by the book's title.

=== Indian influence ===
Sanskrit literature that pre-dates the Nights includes devices that are found in the Nights, such as frame stories and animal fables. The influence of the Panchatantra and Baital Pachisi is particularly notable in the later.

The frame story was traced to ancient Indian literature by Emmanuel Cosquin in 1909. Specifically, he found earlier evidence for these elements from the frame story: (1) A husband who discovers his wife's infidelity and falls into profound grief. He later recovers his joy when he witnesses the fact that a person from a higher social rank is struck by the same misfortune. It appears in the third-century Chinese Tripitaka, a translation of a lost Indian source. (2) A woman deceives her master, who holded her captive in a trunk; while he is fast asleep, she has sexual intercourse with other men. It has Indian variants in the Buddhist Jâtakas, in Somadeva's Kathasaritsagara(11th century) and in the Śukasaptati. (3) The motif of the wise young woman who delays and finally removes an impending danger by telling stories has been traced back to numerous Indian sources like the Śukasaptati, the Siṃhāsana-dvātriṃśikā (Thirty-two Tales of the Throne) and the Vetala Panchavimshati (Twenty-five Tales of the Vampire).

=== Persian prototype: Hezār Afsān ===
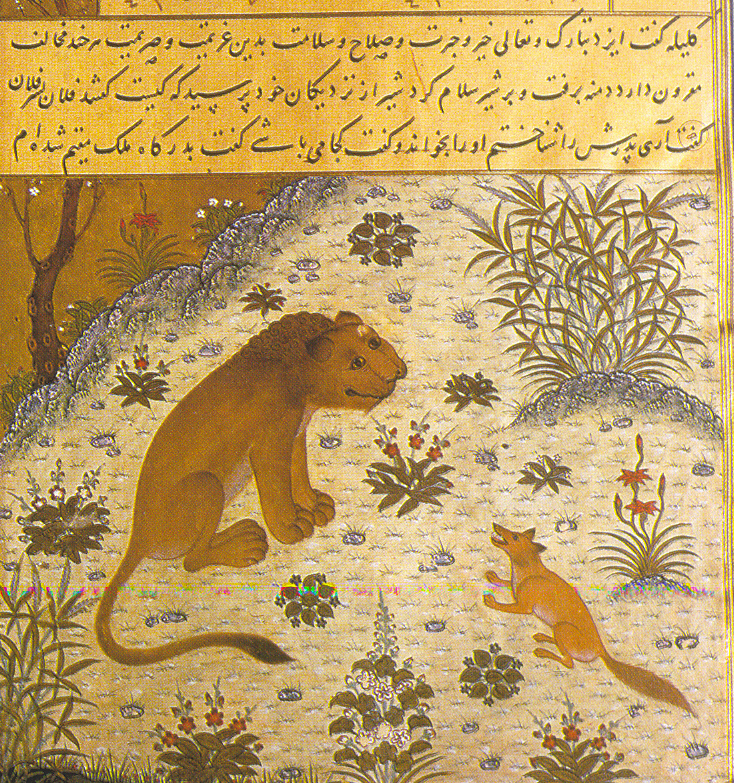
A page from Kelileh va Demneh dated 1429, from Herat, a Persian version of the original ancient Indian Panchatantra – depicts the manipulative jackal-vizier, Dimna, trying to lead his lion-king into war.

The earliest mentions of the Nights refer to it as an Arabic translation from a Persian book, Hezār Afsān (also known as Afsaneh or Afsana), meaning 'The Thousand Stories'.

Iraqi scholar Safa Khulusi (1950s) suggested (on internal rather than historical evidence) that the Persian writer Ibn al-Muqaffa'(d. 759 AD) was responsible for the first Arabic translation of the frame story and some of the Persian stories later incorporated into the Nights. This would place genesis of the collection in the eighth century.Later,the philologist Hilâl Nâjî (1973) discovered a cite of the chancellery secretary, ‘ Abd Allâh Ibn ‘ Abd al-‘ Azîz al-Kâtib, dated to the mid ninth century, that confirmed this attribution : "‘ Abd Allâh Ibn al-Muqaffa‘ translated into Arabic the Hazâr afsâna [fasân?] as well as Kalîla and Dimna, ‘ Ahd Ardashîr and The Book of Mazdak and Kârawand [Nahâwarand?]"

In the tenth century the historian Al-Masudi referred to the Hezār Afsān in his book Murûj al-dhahab(Meadows of God), saying the Arabic translation is called Alf Khurafa ('A Thousand Entertaining Tales'), but is generally known as Alf Layla ('A Thousand Nights'). He mentions the characters Shirāzd (Scheherazade). the vizier daughter and Dināzād, her nurse or maid.

In the same century, the bookseller Ibn al-Nadim compiled a catalogue of books (the "Fihrist") in Baghdad. He noted that the Sassanid kings of Iran enjoyed "evening tales and fables". Al-Nadim then writes about the Persian Hezār Afsān, explaining the frame story it employs: a bloodthirsty king kills off a succession of wives after their wedding night. Eventually he marries a maiden of royal blood, Scheherazade, who possessed wit and intelligence. She save herself by telling him a story every evening, leaving each tale unfinished until the next night so that the king will delay her execution.

According to al-Nadim, the Hezār Afsān contained 1000 nights but only 200 stories. He also writes disparagingly of the collection's literary quality, observing that "it is truly a coarse book, without warmth in the telling". In other passage, he referred that the Hezār Afsān had been composed for the legendary Persian king Bahman’s daughter Humâ’î.

No physical evidence of the Hezār Afsān has survived, so its exact relationship with the existing later Arabic versions remains a mystery. Apart from the Scheherazade frame story, several other tales have Persian origins, although it is unclear how they entered the collection. These stories include the cycle of "King Jali'ad and his Wazir Shimas" and "The Ten Wazirs or the History of King Azadbakht and his Son" (derived from the seventh-century Persian Bakhtiyārnāma).

=== Evolving Arabic manuscripts ===
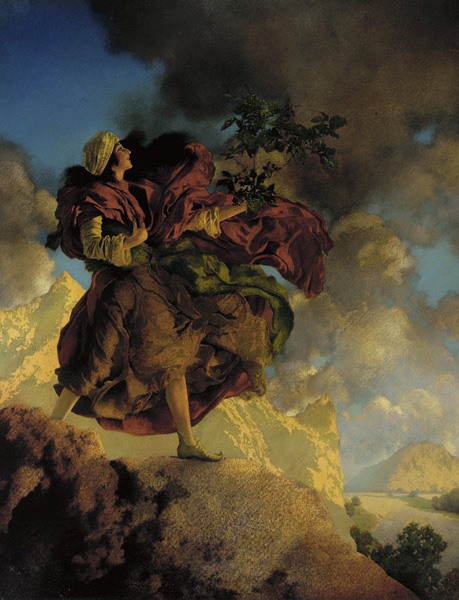
The story of Princess Parizade and the Magic Tree by Maxfield Parrish, 1906

Professor Dwight Reynolds describes the subsequent transformations of the Arabic version:

Some of the earlier Persian tales may have survived within the Arabic tradition altered such that Arabic Muslim names and new locations were substituted for pre-Islamic Persian ones, but it is also clear that whole cycles of Arabic tales were eventually added to the collection and apparently replaced most of the Persian materials. One such cycle of Arabic tales centres around a small group of historical figures from ninth-century Baghdad, including the caliph Harun al-Rashid (died 809), his vizier Jafar al-Barmaki (d. 803) and the licentious poet Abu Nuwas (d. c. 813). Another cluster is a body of stories from late medieval Cairo in which are mentioned persons and places that date to as late as the thirteenth and fourteenth centuries.

According to the 2016 study by scholar Ibrahim Akel, 114 Arabic manuscripts of One Thousand and One Nights are known, including 10 of uncertain affiliation and five that have been lost. These manuscripts date from the eighth to the nineteenth century. Akel classified manuscripts as belonging to the Nights if they contain the frame story of Shahriyār and His Brother or, if the beginning is missing, a division into nights that refers back to the frame story. Most of the manuscripts are fragmentary, and only 15 are considered complete. Of these, 11 belong to ZER (Zotenberg’s Egyptian Recension), two belong to editions related to ZER, and two were forged by Mikha'il Sabbagh.

The earliest known surviving fragment of the Nights is a document discovered in the mid-20th century, by the scholar Nabia Abbott. It contains a few lines of an Arabic work with the title The Book of the Tale of a Thousand Nights, dating from the ninth century. The first reference to the Arabic version under its full title The One Thousand and One Nights appears in Cairo in the 12th century.

Two main Arabic manuscript traditions of the Nights are known, first identified by Hermann Zotenberg (1887): the Syrian and the Egyptian. The Syrian tradition is primarily represented by the earliest extensive manuscript of the Nights, the Galland Manuscript written sometime between AD 1450 and 1593. It and surviving copies of it are much shorter and include fewer tales than the Egyptian tradition. It is represented in print by the so-called Calcutta I (1814–1818) and most notably by the 'Leiden edition' (1984). The Leiden Edition, prepared by Muhsin Mahdi, is the only critical edition of 1001 Nights to date, believed to be most stylistically faithful representation of medieval Arabic versions currently available.

Texts of the Egyptian tradition appear later. They are usually called the Zotenberg Egyptian Recension, and contain many more tales of much more varied content that the Syrian branch; a much larger number of originally independent tales have been incorporated into the collection over the centuries, most of them after the Galland manuscript was written, and were being included as late as in the 18th and 19th centuries.

Zotenberg also identified manuscripts different to both families, mainly some Egyptian manuscripts like the Wortley Montague Codex, that have a unique set of stories after the stable core.

Small groups of similar Manuscripts have been revealed later, like the "Kayseri Family" or the "Anderson Family". The Kayseri Family consists in fragmentary manuscripts from the sixteenth to eighteen century. They contains the oldest extant conclusion of the frame story, in a more elaborate version that the ZER branch. The Anderson Family of manuscripts present a text similar to the syrian branch, but ending in a later point that the later. Their text is intermediate between the Syrian text and ZER.

All extant substantial versions of both recensions share a stable common core of tales, characterized for using the frame technique and containing other stories, have dominant theme is that of injustice and the abuse of power, use the motif of food as a narrative trigger. Sometimes the narrators resemble one another. The tales are:

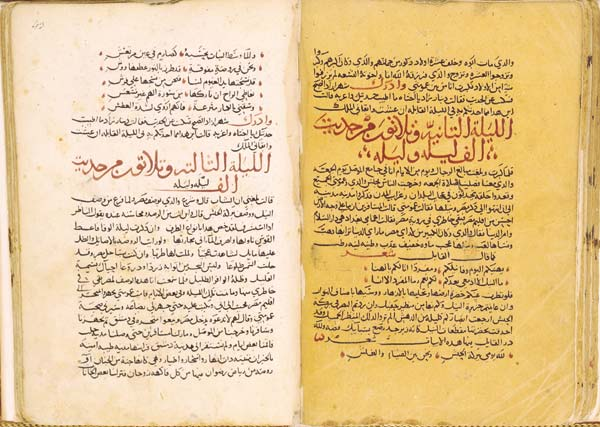
Two pages from the Galland Manuscript containing stories that later appeared in Galland's The Thousand and One Nights. Written sometime between AD 1450 and 1593.

- Shahriyâr and His Brother (Frame story)
- The Trader and the Jinni
- The Fisherman and the Jinni
- The Porter and the Three Ladies
- The Three Apples
- The Hunchback' s Tale.

The texts of the Syrian recension do not contain much beside that core. The relation between both recensions is debated. Scholars as Muhsin Mahdi have suspected that the voluminous nature and recent modification in the Egyptian recension (ZER) andwas caused in part by European demand for a "complete version". Aboubakr Chraïbihas recently argued that the ZER branch is older. ZER contains an older and less elaborate text that Galland's manuscript (From syrian recension). The later contain a more elaborated and islamized elements. It appears that modification in the book has been common throughout the history of the collection, and independent tales have always been added to it. The collection never was fixed and grow until the nineteenth century

=== Turkish manuscripts ===
The One Thousand and One Nights was first translated to Turkish, in many occasions, from the Fifteen century and later. Those turkish manuscripts represent recensions of their own, but they had been little studied.

=== Printed Arabic editions ===
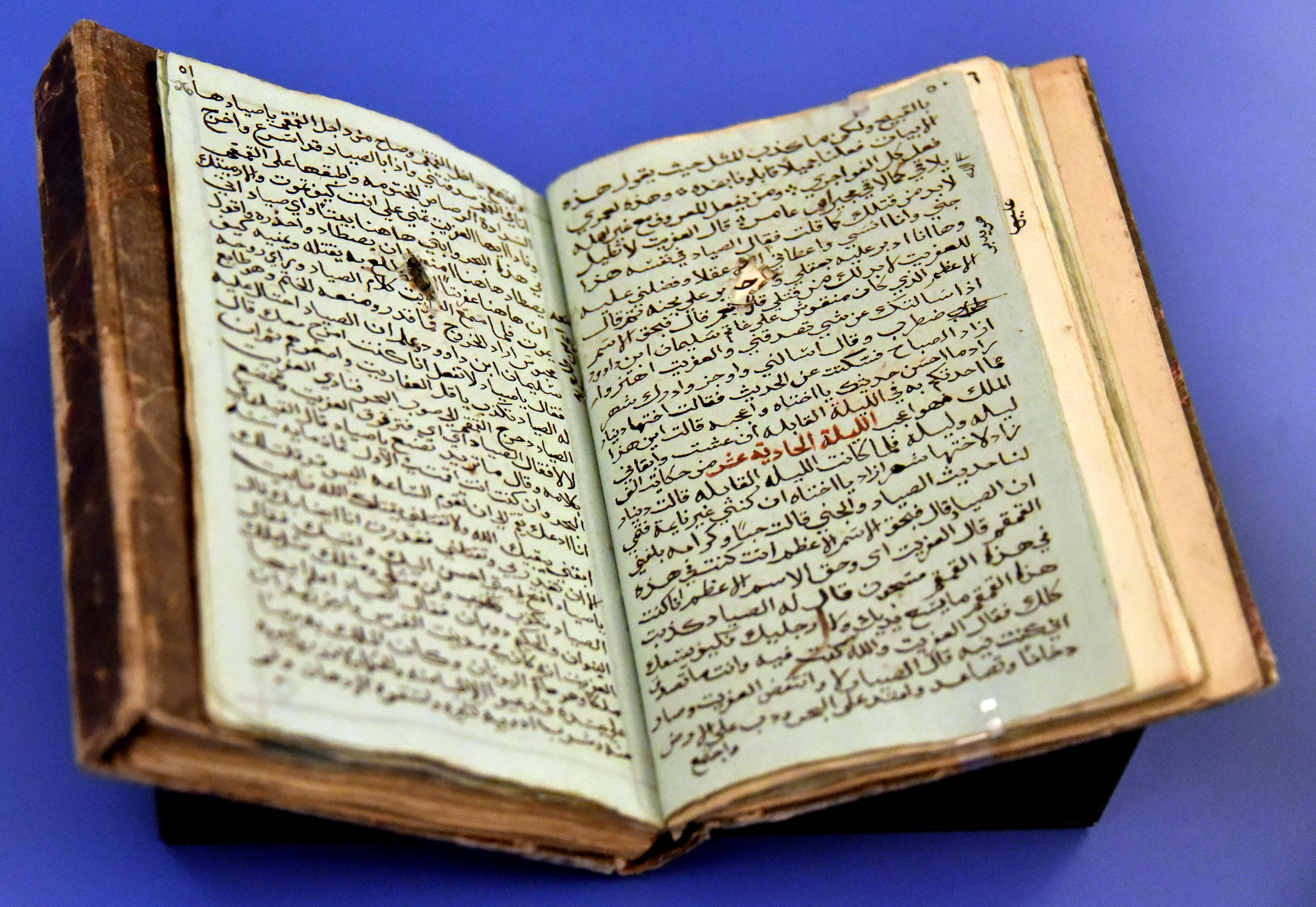
Arabic manuscript with parts of Arabian Nights, collected by Heinrich Friedrich von Diez, 19th century CE, origin unknown

There are four printed versions of the Nights, taken as canonical and used as the basis for translations and reprints. All were done in the 19th century. They are named Calcutta I, Bulaq, Breslau and Calcutta II.

The Nights were first printed in Arabic in two volumes in Calcutta by the British East India Company in 1814–1818. Each volume contained one hundred tales, and was based on the Syrian branch of manuscripts. It is usually referred to as "Calcutta I".

The first printed Arabic-language edition of the One Thousand and One Nights in an Arabic country was the 1835 edition by Bulaq, published by the Egyptian government. It was based on the Egyptian branch of manuscripts The Nights known as "ZER" (Zotenberg's Egyptian Recension) and 200 tales. This edition is known as "Bulaq". It's believed that ZER was composed in the late 18th century. The original is lost, but at least thirteen manuscript copies of ZER survive.

Soon after, the Prussian scholar Christian Maximilian Habicht collaborated with the Tunisian Mordecai ibn al-Najjar to create an edition containing 1001 Nights both in the original Arabic and in German translation, initially in a series of eight volumes published in Breslau in 1825–1838. A further four volumes followed in 1842–1843. Habicht and al-Najjar are said to have used a Tunisian manuscript of the Nights, which was later revealed as a forgery by al-Najjar. In reality Habicht used various manuscripts of the Nights for his edition and is credited as the "creator of a new recension" by scholar Duncan McDonald.

Both the ZER printing and Habicht and al-Najjar's edition influenced the next printing, a four-volume edition also from Calcutta (known as the Macnaghten or Calcutta II edition). This claimed to be based on an older Egyptian manuscript (which has never been found). The last comunes are believed to be mere word-for-word copies from Bulaq.

A major recent edition, which uses the Syrian recension, is a critical edition based on the fourteenth- or fifteenth-century Syrian manuscript in the Bibliothèque Nationale, originally used by Galland. This edition, known as the Leiden text, was compiled in Arabic by Muhsin Mahdi (1984–1994). Mahdi argued that this version is the earliest extant one (a view that is largely accepted today) and that it reflects most closely a "definitive" coherent text ancestral to all others that he believed to have existed during the Mamluk period (a view that remains contentious). Still, even scholars who deny this version the exclusive status of "the only real Arabian Nights" recognize it as the best source on the original style and linguistic form of the medieval work.

In 1997, a further Arabic edition appeared, containing tales from the Arabian Nights transcribed from a seventeenth-century manuscript in the Egyptian dialect of Arabic.

To this day, no critical edition has been done for the more voluminous ZER text.

=== First European Translations ===
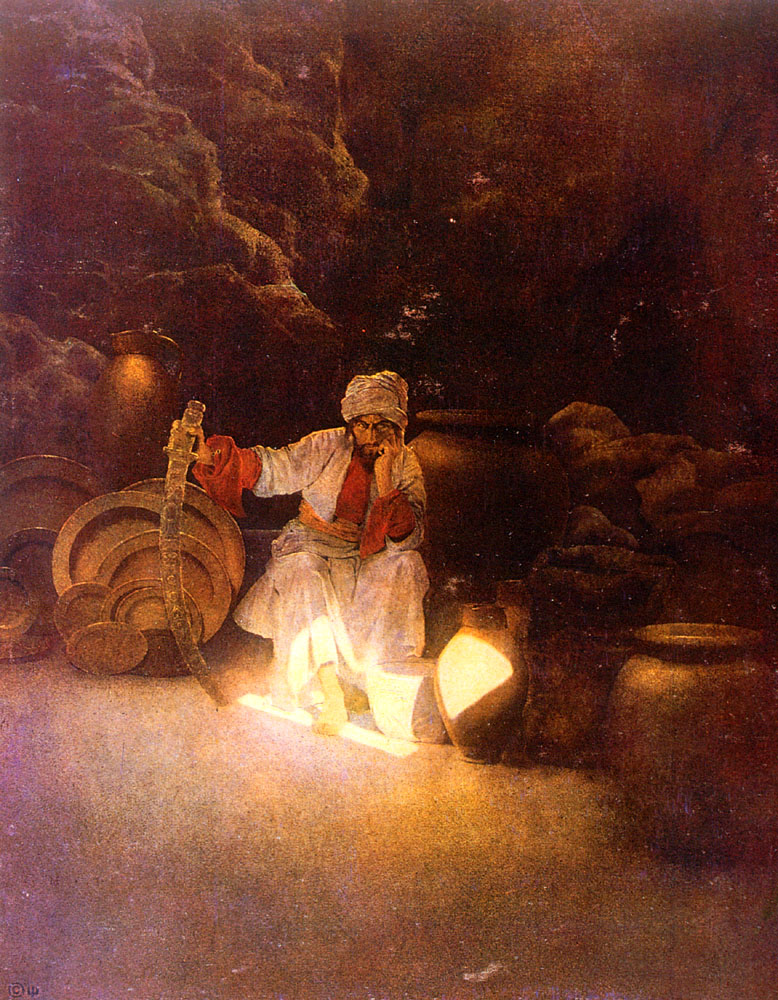
Cassim in the Cave by Maxfield Parrish (1909)

The first European version (1704–1717) was translated into French by Antoine Galland from an Arabic text of the Syrian recension and other sources. This 12-volume work, Les Mille et une nuits, contes arabes traduits en français ('The Thousand and one nights, Arab stories translated into French'), included stories that were not in the original Arabic manuscript. "Aladdin's Lamp", and "Ali Baba and the Forty Thieves" (as well as several other lesser-known tales) appeared first in Galland's translation and cannot be found in any of the original manuscripts. He wrote that he heard them from the Christian Maronite storyteller Hanna Diab during Diab's visit to Paris. Galland's version of the Nights was immensely popular throughout Europe, and later versions were issued by Galland's publisher using Galland's name without his consent.

As scholars were looking for the presumed "complete" and "original" form of the Nights, they naturally turned to the more voluminous texts of the Egyptian recension, which soon came to be viewed as the "standard version". The first translations of this kind, such as that of Edward Lane (1840, 1859), were bowdlerized. Unabridged and uncensored translations were made, first by John Payne, under the title The Book of the Thousand Nights and One Night (1882, nine volumes), and then by Sir Richard Francis Burton, entitled The Book of the Thousand Nights and a Night (1885, ten volumes) – the latter was, according to some assessments, partially based on the former, leading to charges of plagiarism.

In view of the sexual imagery in the source texts (which Burton emphasized even further, especially by adding extensive footnotes and appendices on Oriental sexual mores) and the strict Victorian laws on obscene material, both of these translations were printed as private editions for subscribers only, rather than published in the usual manner. Burton's original 10 volumes were followed by a further six (seven in the Baghdad Edition and perhaps others) entitled The Supplemental Nights to the Thousand Nights and a Night, which were printed between 1886 and 1888. It has, however, been criticized for its "archaic language and extravagant idiom" and "obsessive focus on sexuality" (and has even been called an "eccentric ego-trip" and a "highly personal reworking of the text").

Later versions of the Nights include that of the French doctor J. C. Mardrus, issued from 1898 to 1904. It was translated into English by Powys Mathers, and issued in 1923. Like Payne's and Burton's texts, it is based on the Egyptian recension and retains the erotic material, indeed expanding on it. Although it has been criticized by scholar for inaccuracy, the edition was popular, translated to many languages and continued to be reprinted.

=== Modern Translations ===
Muhsin Mahdi's 1984 Leiden edition, based on the Galland Manuscript, was rendered into English by Husain Haddawy (1990). This translation has been praised as "very readable" and "strongly recommended for anyone who wishes to taste the authentic flavour of those tales". An additional second volume of Arabian Nights translated by Haddawy, composed of popular tales not present in the Leiden edition, was published in 1995. Both volumes were the basis for a single-volume reprint of selected tales of Haddawy's translations.

An English translation was published by Penguin Classics in three volumes in 2008. It was translated by Malcolm C. Lyons and Ursula Lyons with an introduction and annotations by Robert Irwin. This is the first complete translation of the Macnaghten or Calcutta II edition (Egyptian recension) since Burton's. It contains, in addition to the standard text of 1001 Nights, the so-called "orphan stories" of "Aladdin" and "Ali Baba" as well as an alternative ending to "The seventh journey of Sindbad" from Antoine Galland's original French. As the translator notes in his preface to the three volumes, "[N]o attempt has been made to superimpose on the translation changes that would be needed to 'rectify' ... accretions, ... repetitions, non sequiturs and confusions that mark the present text," and the work is a "representation of what is primarily oral literature, appealing to the ear rather than the eye". The Lyons translation includes all the poetry (in plain prose paraphrase) but does not attempt to reproduce in English the internal rhyming of some prose sections of the original Arabic. Moreover, it streamlines somewhat and has cuts. In this sense it is not, as claimed, a complete translation. This translation was generally well-received upon release.

A new translation was published in December 2021, the first English-language translation solely by a female author, Yasmine Seale, which removes earlier sexist and racist references. (Claudia Ott previously translated various versions of the Nights to German.) This translation includes all the tales from Hanna Diyab and additionally includes stories featuring female protagonists, such as the tales about Parizade, Pari Banu, and the horror story of Sidi Numan. Selecting from the Arabic and Galland French text, she also presented summaries of the tales of Hanna Diyab not used by Galland.

=== Timeline ===
Scholars have assembled a timeline concerning the publication history of The Nights:

- One of the oldest Arabic manuscript fragments from Syria (a few handwritten pages) dating to the early ninth century. Discovered by scholar Nabia Abbott in 1948, it bears the title Kitab Hadith Alf Layla ("The Book of the Tale of the Thousand Nights") and the first few lines of the book in which Dinazad asks Shirazad (Scheherazade) to tell her stories.
- 10th century: mention of Hezār Afsān in Ibn al-Nadim's "Fihrist" (Catalogue of books) in Baghdad. He attributes a pre-Islamic Sassanid Persian origin to the collection and refers to the frame story of Scheherazade telling stories over a thousand nights to save her life.
- 10th century: reference to The Thousand Nights, an Arabic translation of the Persian Hezār Afsān ("Thousand Stories"), in Muruj Al-Dhahab (The Meadows of Gold) by Al-Mas'udi.
- 12th century: a document from Cairo refers to a Jewish bookseller lending a copy of The Thousand and One Nights (this is the first appearance of the final form of the title).
- 14th century: Date of the oldest manuscript with any narrative (Sul and Shumul), indexed Tubingen M a VI 33. Another fragment of the story is also found in the manuscript KFCRIS 2415 from the 15th century. For some unknown reason, Sul and Shumul didnt appear in later texts.
- 1450-1593: Date of the oldest manuscript of the Nights with the complete frame story (Bnf 3609-3611).This manuscript would be acquired by Galland. It belongs to the Syrian branch and contains 281 Nights with about 36 tales. Nowadays in the Bibliothèque nationale de France in Paris.
- 15th century: The first Turkish translation of the Nights is made. Only survives in fragmentary manuscripts, and later (also fragmentary) editions different from each other.
- 1636: A new Turkish translation done upon the order of Sultan Murad IV, by Muslih bin Mehmet Beyânî. It had additional tales and added explicit scenes and dialogues about sex and sexuality. It is preserved in an incomplete 9-volume manuscript in Paris (Bnf Turc 356.2-356.10).
- 1704: Antoine Galland's French translation is the first European version of Nights. Later volumes introduced tales not present in the Arabic manuscripts, but that Galland heard from the Syrian storyteller Hanna Diyab (like Aladdin and Ali Baba).
- c. 1706–1721: an anonymously translated 12-volume English version appears in Europe, dubbed the "Grub Street" version. This is entitled Arabian Nights' Entertainments—the first known use of the common English title of the work.
- 1764:The Wortley Montague manuscript is transcribed in 8 volumes by some "Umar al-Safatī" in Egypt, the manuscript presents a unique collection of tales and shows that no standard edition existed at the time
- c.1775: Possible date of the final composition of the Egyptian version of Nights called "ZER" (Hermann Zotenberg's Egyptian Recension) with 200 tales on manuscript (original lost, survived on many copies).
- 1788-1789: The Syrian monk Denis Chavis and the French storyteller Jacques Cazotte publish a pseudo-translation named Continuation of the Thousand and One Nights, based on a manuscript in Chavis's possession. It claimed to be a more complete text than Gallands. The tales were heavily modified by Cazzotte, who also added tales of his own.
- 1806: The French orientalist Caussin de Perceval publishes a re-edition of Galland’s translation, in 9 volumes. The last two were a retranslation of the Chavis manuscript.
- 1804–1806, 1825: Austrian polyglot and orientalist Joseph von Hammer-Purgstall (1774–1856) obtains a member of the Egyptian branch. It was lost on shipwreck, but Von Hammer obtained other similar manuscript that he translated into French between 1804 and 1806. His French translation, which was partially abridged and included Galland's "orphan stories", has been lost, but its translation into German by A. E. Zinserlin (1823) survives. The translation of Zinzerlin was retranslated into English (1825; Lamb) and French (1828; Trébutien).
- 1811: Jonathan Scott (1754–1829) produces an English translation, mostly based on Galland's French version, supplemented by other sources, mainly the Wortley Montague manuscript. Robert Irwin calls it the "first literary translation into English", in contrast to earlier translations from French by "Grub Street hacks". Scott has translated some unique tales of the Anderson manuscript in his book "Tales, Anecdotes, and Letters from the Arabic and Persian" (1800).
- Early 19th century: Modern Persian translations of the text are made, variously under the title Alf leile va leile, Hezār-o yek šhab (هزار و یک شب), or, in distorted Arabic, Alf al-leil. Muhammad Baqir Khurasani Buzanjirdi (b.1770) finalized his translation in 1814, patronized by Henry Russell, 2nd Baronet (1783–1852), British Resident in Hyderabad. Three decades later, Abdul Latif Tasuji completed his translation. It was later illustrated by Sani ol Molk (1814–1866) for Mohammad Shah Qajar.
- 1814: Calcutta I, the earliest existing Arabic printed version, is published by the British East India Company. A second volume was released in 1818. Both had 100 tales each.
- 1822-23: In France, Édouard Gauttier d'Arc published an expanded edition of Galland in seven volumes, including tales from the Scott translation, Caussin de Perceval’s edition, and new tales from manuscripts from Langles.
- 1824–1838: the Breslau/Habicht edition is published in Arabic in eight volumes. Christian Maximilian Habicht (born in Breslau, Prussia, 1775) collaborated with the Tunisian Mordecai ibn al-Najjar to create this edition containing 1001 nights. In addition to the Galland manuscript, they used the texts from Chavis, Mikha'il Sabbagh and what they said to be a Tunisian manuscript, which was later revealed as a forgery by al-Najjar. Using the Galland, Scott, Caussin of Perceval and Gauttier versions of Nights, tales from Al-Najjar, and other stories of unknown origin, Habicht published a "full translation" in German in 15 volumes since 1825.
- 1852: Italian edition of Giacomo Antonelli & Co. translated by A.F. Falconetti, a composite text that included unique material taken from Caylus and the Abbot Blanchet.Reprinted in 1852.
- 1835: Bulaq version: these two volumes, printed by the Egyptian government, are the oldest printed and published version of Nights in Arabic by a non-European. It is primarily a printing of a lost ZER manuscript.
- 1838: Henry Torrens's English translation of 50 tales published in London and Calcutta.
- 1838–1840: Edward William Lane publishes an English translation. Notable for Lane's exclusion of content he found immoral and for his anthropological notes on Arab customs.
- 1838–1841: First edition of the German translation by Gustav Weil in 4 volumes. He introduces many tales not found in other sources, supposedly based on a Gotha manuscript.
- 1839–1842: Calcutta II (4 volumes) is published. It claims to be based on an older Egyptian manuscript (which has never been found). This edition contains many elements and stories from the Breslau and Calcutta I.
- 1842–1843: Four additional volumes of the Breslau edition, by Heinrich Leberecht Fleischer, after Habicht's death.
- 1882–1884: John Payne publishes an English version translated entirely from Calcutta II, adding some tales from Calcutta I and Breslau.
- 1885–1888: Sir Richard Francis Burton publishes an English translation in 10 volumes from several sources (largely the same as Payne). His version accentuated the sexuality of the stories vis-à-vis Lane's bowdlerized translation. He also publishes 6 additional supplementary volumes based on Breslau, Galland, and the Wortley Montague and Chavis manuscripts.
- 1893: French writer Albert Caise published a collection of algerian folktales in a weekly serial, with the name "Contes oubliés des Mille et une nuits" (Forgotten Tales from the One Thousand and One Nights), He stated that the stories belonged to the 1001 Nights.
- 1898–1904: J. C. Mardrus publishes a French version using Bulaq and Calcutta II editions. It was an amalgam of stories from various sources. It became popular throughout Europe and was reprinted many times. An English translation by Powys Mathers was published in 1937.
- 1921-1928: A faithful and philologically correct translation to the German language, by Enno Littmann, using Bulaq and Calcutta II.
- 1929-1939: The first Russian translation directly from the Arabic (from Calcutta II) was made by Mikhail Salye, published in eight volumes by Academia.
- 1955: The first Spanish Translation from the Arabic was made by Rafael Cansinos-Asséns, published in Mexico by Editorial Aguilar. It was acclaimed by the writer Jorge Luis Borges. It contains the text of Calcutta II, translations from Mardrus, and unique tales from unknown sources. Later Spanish arabists have accused Cansinos to not translate from the Arabic, but the question is unresolved.
- 1961: Mikhail Salye published an additional volume: Халиф на час. Новые сказки из книги «Тысячи и одной ночи (Caliph for an Hour: New Tales from the Arabian Nights), containing seven tales not contained in Calcutta II (from a mystified Sabbagh manuscript).
- 1964-1965: Translations published in Spain from the Arabic Bulaq edition to the Spanish by Arabist Juan Vernet in Editorial Planeta (1964) and the duo Juan Antonio Gutiérrez-Larraya y Leonor Martínez Martín (1965) in Argos Vergara.
- 1966: First full translation of the Wortley Montague manuscript by Felix Tauer in German.
- 1973: First Polish translation based on the original language edition, but compressed 12 volumes to 9, by Państwowy Instytut Wydawniczy.
- 1984: Muhsin Mahdi publishes an Arabic edition based on the oldest surviving Arabic manuscript (based on the Galland Syrian manuscript currently held in the Bibliothèque Nationale).
- 1986–1987: French translation by Arabist René R. Khawam. He used the Chavis and Sabbagh manuscripts, believing them to be as genuine as the earlier Galland one.
- 1990: Husain Haddawy publishes an English translation of Mahdi edition.
- 1991: French translation by Arabists Jamel-Eddine Bencheikh and André Miquel for the Bibliothèque de la Pléiade. Based on the ZER recension.
- 2005-2021: Massive Portuguese translation by Brazilian professor Mamede Mustafa Jarouche in 5 volumes. Instead of using the canonical Vulgate text (ZER), Jarouche opted to use the original manuscripts as a source, including the Maillet, Rylands, Tubingen, Gayangos, Paris, Sabbagh and other manuscripts. Jarouche present original tales and variants from those manuscripts from the first time.
- 2008: New Penguin Classics translation (in three volumes) by Malcolm C. Lyons and Ursula Lyons of the Calcutta II edition
- 2018: German translation of the Kayseri manuscript for the first time by Claudia Ott, in her Tausendundeine Nacht. Das glückliche Ende. (1001 Nights. The Happy Ending). The Kayseri manuscript is the oldest one with the ending of the frame story of Schariar and Sherezade, much different from the late vulgata from ZER. Ott had translated the Mahdi text to the german in 2004.
- 2022: Claudia Ott published a translation of 4 loves stories of the Nights in her book: Tausendundeine Nacht – Das Buch der Liebe (1001 Nights – The Book of Love). It includes Sul and Shumul, the oldest story found in any Nights fragments, but that is not present in later versions.

== Literary themes and techniques ==
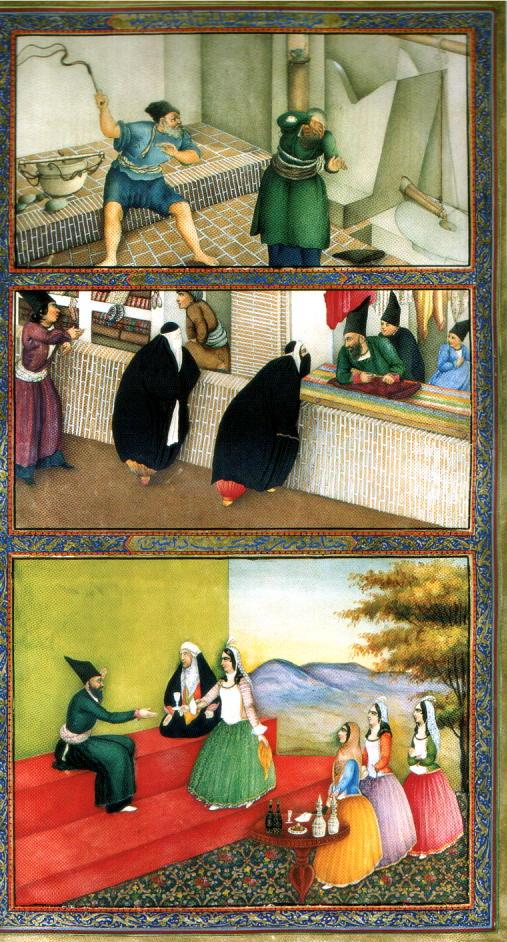
Illustration of One Thousand and One Nights by Sani ol Molk, Iran, 1853

The One Thousand and One Nights and various tales within it make use of many innovative literary techniques, which the storytellers of the tales rely on for increased drama, suspense, or other emotions. Some of these date back to earlier Persian, Indian and Arabic literature, while others were original to the One Thousand and One Nights.

=== Frame story ===
The One Thousand and One Nights employs an early example of the frame story, or framing device: the character Scheherazade narrates a set of tales (most often fairy tales) to the Sultan Shahriyar over many nights. Many of Scheherazade's tales are themselves frame stories, such as the "Tale of Sinbad the Seaman and Sinbad the Landsman", which is a collection of adventures related by Sinbad the Seaman to Sinbad the Landsman.

In folkloristics, the frame story is classified as ATU 875B*, "Storytelling Saves a Wife from Death".

=== Embedded narrative ===
The One Thousand and One Nights is an early example of the "story within a story", or embedded narrative technique. This can be traced back to earlier Persian and Indian storytelling traditions, most notably the Panchatantra of ancient Sanskrit literature. The Nights, however, introduces the stories differently from how the Panchatantra does. In the Panchatantra, stories are introduced as didactic analogies, with the frame story referring to these stories with variants of the phrase "If you're not careful, that which happened to the louse and the flea will happen to you." In the Nights, this didactic framework is the least common way of introducing the story: instead, a story is most commonly introduced through subtle means, particularly as an answer to questions raised in a previous tale.

The general story is narrated by an unknown narrator, and in this narration the stories are told by Scheherazade. In most of Scheherazade's narrations there are also stories narrated, and even in some of these, there are some other stories. The story of "Sinbad the Sailor" story narrated by Scheherazade in the One Thousand and One Nights is an example, where the protagonist Sinbad the Sailor narrates the stories of his seven voyages to Sinbad the Porter. The device is also used in "The Three Apples" and "The Seven Viziers". In yet another tale Scheherazade narrates, "The Fisherman and the Jinni", the "Tale of the Wazir and the Sage Duban" is narrated within it, and within that there are three more tales narrated.

The narrator's standards for what constitutes a cliffhanger seem broader than in modern literature. While in many cases a story is cut off with the hero in danger of losing their life or another kind of deep trouble, in some parts of the full text Scheherazade stops her narration in the middle of an exposition of abstract philosophical principles or complex points of Islamic philosophy, and in one case during a detailed description of human anatomy according to Galen—and in all of these cases she turns out to be justified in her belief that the king's curiosity about the sequel would buy her another day of life.

=== Dramatic visualization ===
Dramatic visualization is "the representing of an object or character with an abundance of descriptive detail, or the mimetic rendering of gestures and dialogue in such a way as to make a given scene 'visual' or imaginatively present to an audience". This technique is used in several tales of the One Thousand and One Nights, such as the tale of "The Three Apples" (see Crime fiction elements below).

=== Fate and destiny ===
A common theme in many Arabian Nights tales is fate and destiny. Italian filmmaker Pier Paolo Pasolini observed:

[E]very tale in The Thousand and One Nights begins with an 'appearance of destiny' which manifests itself through an anomaly, and one anomaly always generates another. So a chain of anomalies is set up. And the more logical, tightly knit, essential this chain is, the more beautiful the tale. By 'beautiful' I mean vital, absorbing and exhilarating. The chain of anomalies always tends to lead back to normality. The end of every tale in The One Thousand and One Nights consists of a 'disappearance' of destiny, which sinks back to the somnolence of daily life ... The protagonist of the stories is in fact destiny itself.

Though invisible, fate may be considered a leading character in the One Thousand and One Nights. The plot devices often used to present this theme are coincidence, reverse causation, and the self-fulfilling prophecy (see Foreshadowing section below).

=== Foreshadowing ===
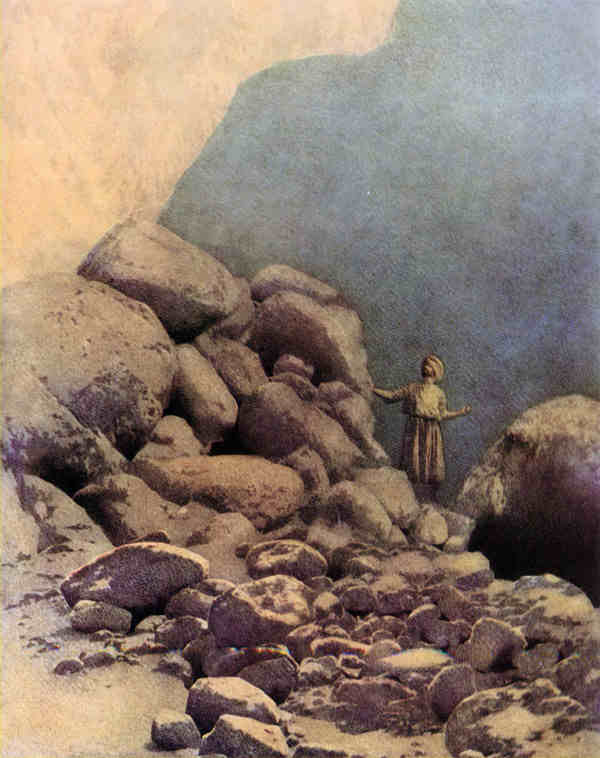
Sindbad and the Valley of Diamonds, from the Second Voyage

Early examples of the foreshadowing technique of repetitive designation, now known as "Chekhov's gun", occur in the One Thousand and One Nights, which contains "repeated references to some character or object which appears insignificant when first mentioned but which reappears later to intrude suddenly in the narrative." A notable example is in the tale of "The Three Apples" (see Crime fiction elements below).

Another early foreshadowing technique is formal patterning, "the organization of the events, actions and gestures which constitute a narrative and give shape to a story; when done well, formal patterning allows the audience the pleasure of discerning and anticipating the structure of the plot as it unfolds." This technique is also found in One Thousand and One Nights, where it takes the form of a repeating story–cliffhanger–story–cliffhanger pattern.

==== The self-fulfilling prophecy ====
Several tales in the One Thousand and One Nights use the self-fulfilling prophecy, as a special form of literary prolepsis, to foreshadow what is going to happen. This literary device dates back to the story of Krishna in ancient Sanskrit literature, and Oedipus or the death of Heracles in the plays of Sophocles. A variation of this device is the self-fulfilling dream, which can be found in Arabic literature (or the dreams of Joseph and his conflicts with his brothers, in the Hebrew Bible).

A notable example is "The Ruined Man who Became Rich Again through a Dream", in which a man is told in his dream to leave his native city of Baghdad and travel to Cairo, where he will discover the whereabouts of some hidden treasure. The man travels there and experiences misfortune, ending up in jail, where he tells his dream to a police officer. The officer mocks the idea of foreboding dreams and tells the protagonist that he himself had a dream about a house with a courtyard and fountain in Baghdad where treasure is buried under the fountain. The man recognizes the place as his own house and, after he is released from jail, he returns home and digs up the treasure. In other words, the foreboding dream not only predicted the future, but the dream was the cause of its prediction coming true. A variant of this story later appears in English folklore as the "Pedlar of Swaffham" and Paulo Coelho's The Alchemist; Jorge Luis Borges' collection of short stories A Universal History of Infamy featured his translation of this particular story into Spanish, as "The Story of the Two Dreamers".

"The Tale of Attaf" depicts another variation of the self-fulfilling prophecy, whereby Harun al-Rashid consults his library (the House of Wisdom), reads a random book, "falls to laughing and weeping and dismisses the faithful vizier Ja'far ibn Yahya from sight. Ja'afar, disturbed and upset, flees Baghdad and plunges into a series of adventures in Damascus, involving Attaf and the woman whom Attaf eventually marries". After returning to Baghdad, Ja'afar reads the same book that caused Harun to laugh and weep, and discovers that it describes his own adventures with Attaf. In other words, it was Harun's reading of the book that provoked the adventures described in the book to take place. This is an early example of reverse causation.

Near the end of the tale, Attaf is given a death sentence for a crime he did not commit but Harun, knowing the truth from what he has read in the book, prevents this and has Attaf released from prison. In the 12th century, this tale was translated into Latin by Petrus Alphonsi and included in his Disciplina Clericalis, alongside the "Sindibad" story cycle. In the 14th century, a version of "The Tale of Attaf" also appears in the Gesta Romanorum and Giovanni Boccaccio's The Decameron.

=== Repetition ===
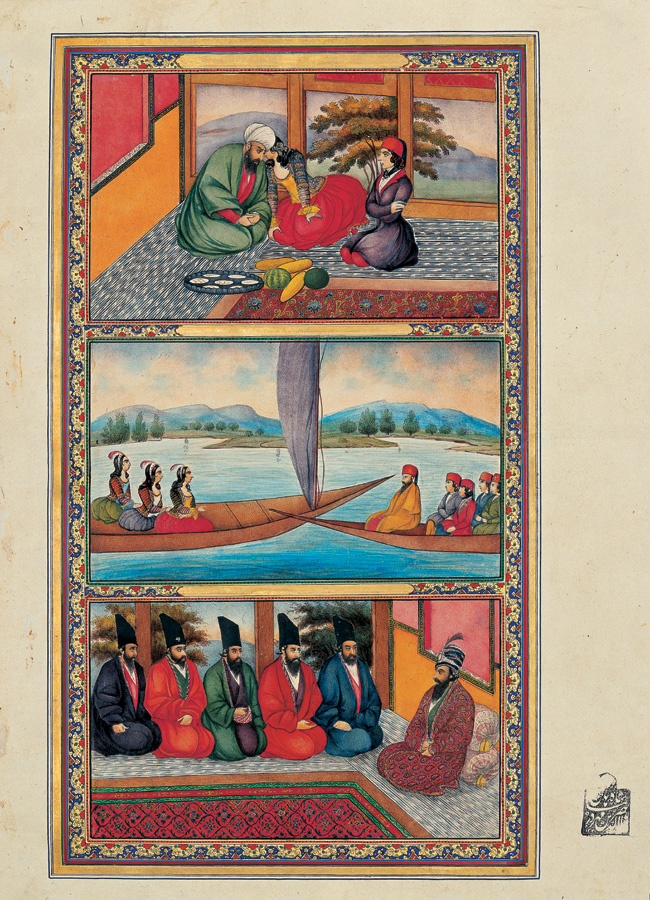
Illustration of One Thousand and One Nights by Sani ol molk, Iran, 1849–1856

Leitwortstil is "the purposeful repetition of words" in a given literary piece that "usually expresses a motif or theme important to the given story." This device occurs in the One Thousand and One Nights, which binds several tales in a story cycle. The storytellers of the tales relied on this technique "to shape the constituent members of their story cycles into a coherent whole".

Another technique used in the One Thousand and One Nights is thematic patterning, which is:

[T]he distribution of recurrent thematic concepts and moralistic motifs among the various incidents and frames of a story. In a skillfully crafted tale, thematic patterning may be arranged so as to emphasize the unifying argument or salient idea which disparate events and disparate frames have in common.

Several different variants of the "Cinderella" story, which has its origins in the ancient Greek story of Rhodopis, appear in the One Thousand and One Nights, including "The Second Shaykh's Story", "The Eldest Lady's Tale" and "Abdallah ibn Fadil and His Brothers", all dealing with the theme of a younger sibling harassed by two jealous elders. In some of these, the siblings are female, while in others they are male. One of the tales, "Judar and His Brethren", departs from the happy endings of previous variants and reworks the plot to give it a tragic ending instead, with the younger brother being poisoned by his elder brothers.

=== Racism and sexism ===
The Nights have been criticized for showing racist and sexist influence in medieval Islamic culture, including slavery as a divine punishment for blacks and the supposed perils of insatiable female sexual desire. A more recent edition of the Nights translated by Yasmine Seale removes these references and instead promotes female protagonists.

=== Sexual humour ===
The Nights contain many examples of sexual humour. Some of this borders on satire, as in the tale called "Ali with the Large Member", which pokes fun at the obsession with male genitalia.

=== Unreliable narrator ===
The literary device of the unreliable narrator was used in several fictional medieval Arabic tales of the One Thousand and One Nights. In one tale, "The Seven Viziers" (also known as "Craft and Malice of Women or The Tale of the King, His Son, His Concubine and the Seven Wazirs"), a courtesan accuses a king's son of having abused her, when in reality she had failed to rape him (inspired by the Qur'anic/Biblical story of Yusuf/Joseph). Seven viziers attempt to save his life by narrating seven stories to prove the unreliability of women, and the courtesan responds by narrating a story to prove the unreliability of viziers. The unreliable narrator device is also used to generate suspense in "The Three Apples" and humor in "The Hunchback's Tale" (see Crime fiction elements below).

=== Genre elements ===
==== Crime fiction ====
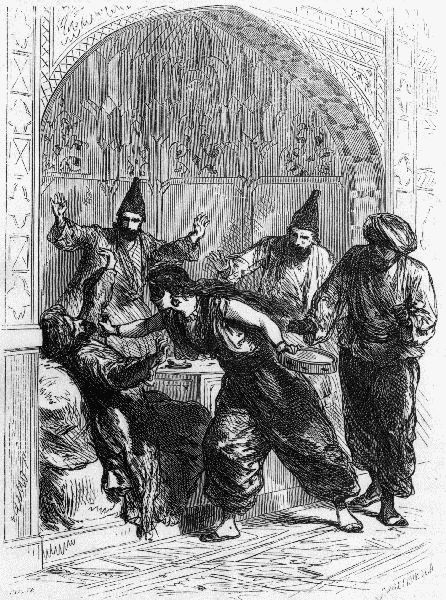
Godefroy Durand illustration of Morgiana and the thieves from Ali Baba and the Forty Thieves

An example of the murder mystery and suspense thriller genres in the collection, with multiple plot twists and detective fiction elements was "The Three Apples", also known as Hikayat al-sabiyya 'l-maqtula ('The Tale of the Murdered Young Woman').

In this tale, Harun al-Rashid comes to possess a chest, which, when opened, contains the body of a young woman. Harun gives his vizier, Ja'far, three days to find the culprit or be executed. At the end of three days, when Ja'far is about to be executed for his failure, two men come forward, both claiming to be the murderer. As they tell their story it transpires that, although the younger of them, the woman's husband, was responsible for her death, some of the blame attaches to a slave, who had taken one of the apples mentioned in the title and caused the woman's murder.

Harun then gives Ja'far three more days to find the guilty slave. When he yet again fails to find the culprit, and bids his family goodbye before his execution, he discovers by chance his daughter has the apple, which she obtained from Ja'far's own slave, Rayhan. Thus the mystery is solved.

Another Nights tale with crime fiction elements was "The Hunchback's Tale" story cycle, which, unlike "The Three Apples", was more of a suspenseful comedy and courtroom drama rather than a murder mystery or detective fiction. The story is set in a fictional China and begins with a hunchback, the emperor's favourite comedian, being invited to dinner by a tailor couple. The hunchback accidentally chokes on his food from laughing too hard and the couple, fearful that the emperor will be furious, take his body to a Jewish doctor's clinic and leave him there. This leads to the next tale in the cycle, the "Tale of the Jewish Doctor", where the doctor accidentally trips over the hunchback's body, falls down the stairs with him, and finds him dead, leading him to believe that the fall had killed him. The doctor then dumps his body down a chimney, and this leads to yet another tale in the cycle, which continues with twelve tales in total, leading to all the people involved in this incident finding themselves in a courtroom, all making different claims over how the hunchback had died. Crime fiction elements are also present near the end of "The Tale of Attaf" (see Foreshadowing above).

==== Horror fiction ====
Haunting is used as a plot device in gothic fiction and horror fiction, as well as modern paranormal fiction. Legends about haunted houses have long appeared in literature. In particular, the Arabian Nights tale of "Ali the Cairene and the Haunted House in Baghdad" revolves around a house haunted by jinn. The Nights is almost certainly the earliest surviving literature that mentions ghouls, and many of the stories in that collection involve or reference ghouls. A prime example is the story "The History of Gherib and His Brother Agib" (from Nights vol. 6), in which Gherib, an outcast prince, fights off a family of ravenous ghouls and then enslaves them and converts them to Islam.

Horror fiction elements are also found in "The City of Brass" tale, which revolves around a ghost town.

The horrific nature of Scheherazade's situation is magnified in Stephen King's Misery, in which the protagonist is forced to write a novel to keep his captor from torturing and killing him. The influence of the Nights on modern horror fiction is certainly discernible in the work of H. P. Lovecraft. As a child, he was fascinated by the adventures recounted in the book, and he attributes some of his creations to his love of the 1001 Nights.

==== Fantasy and science fiction ====
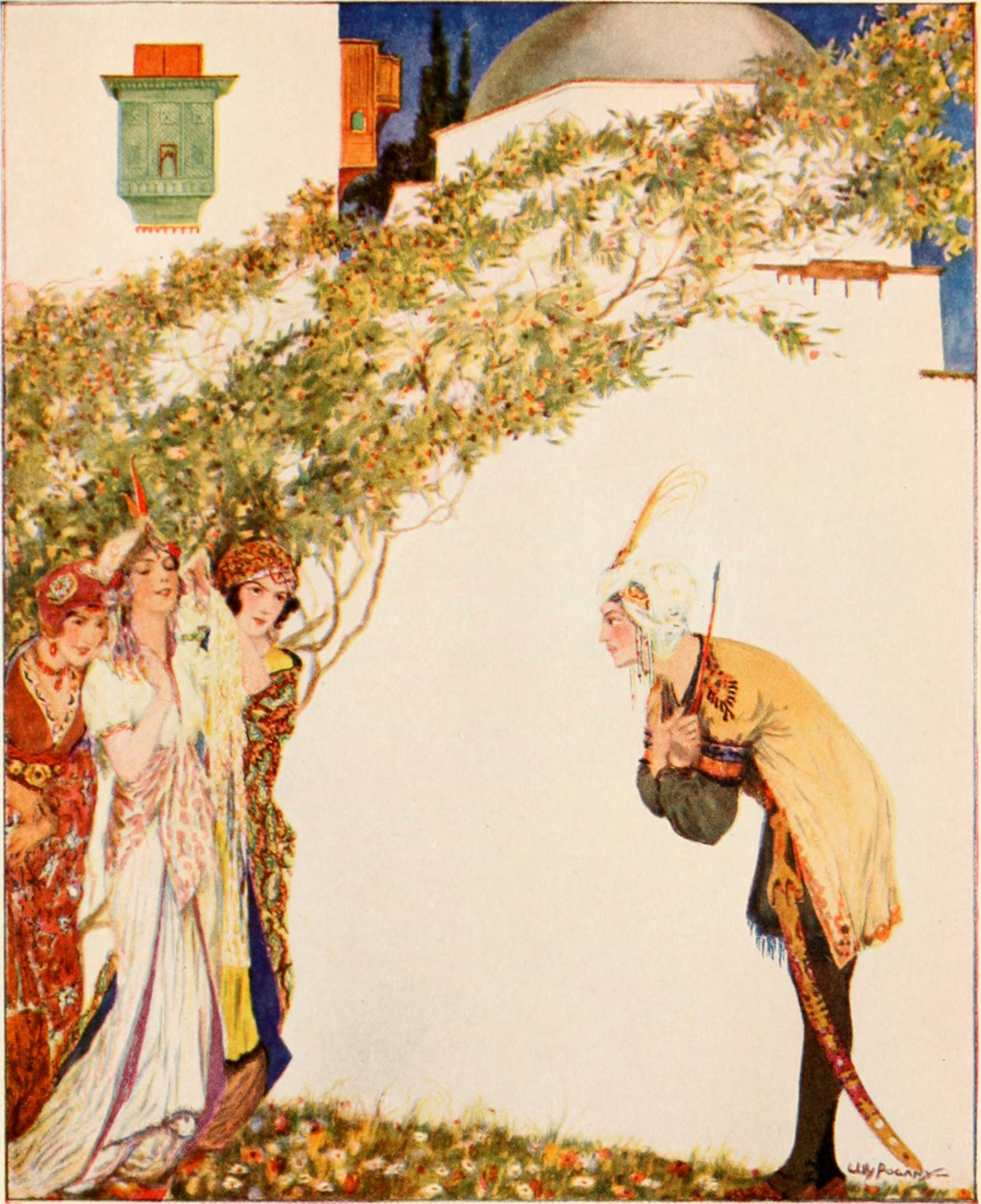
An illustration of the "Story of Prince Ahmed and the Fairy Paribanou", More tales from the Arabian nights by Willy Pogany (1915)

A number of stories within the One Thousand and One Nights also feature science fiction elements. One example is "The Adventures of Bulukiya", where the protagonist Bulukiya's quest for the herb of immortality leads him to explore the seas, journey to the Garden of Eden and to Jahannam, and travel across the cosmos to different worlds much larger than his own world, anticipating elements of galactic science fiction; along the way, he encounters societies of jinns, mermaids, talking serpents, talking trees, and other forms of life. In another Arabian Nights tale, the protagonist Abdullah the Fisherman gains the ability to breathe underwater and discovers an underwater submarine society that is portrayed as an inverted reflection of society on land, in that the underwater society follows a form of primitive communism where concepts like money and clothing do not exist. Other Arabian Nights tales deal with lost ancient technologies, advanced ancient civilizations that went astray, and catastrophes which overwhelmed them. "The City of Brass" features a group of travellers on an archaeological expedition across the Sahara to find an ancient lost city and attempt to recover a brass vessel that Solomon once used to trap a jinn, and, along the way, encounter a mummified queen, petrified inhabitants, life-like humanoid robots and automata, seductive marionettes dancing without strings, and a brass horseman robot who directs the party towards the ancient city. "The Ebony Horse" features a robot in the form of a flying mechanical horse controlled using keys that could fly into outer space and towards the Sun, while the "Third Qalandar's Tale" also features a robot in the form of an uncanny boatman. "The City of Brass" and "The Ebony Horse" can be considered early examples of proto-science fiction.

=== Poetry ===
There is an abundance of Arabic poetry in One Thousand and One Nights. It is often deployed by stories' narrators to provide detailed descriptions, usually of the beauty of characters. Characters also occasionally quote or speak in verse in certain settings. The uses include but are not limited to:

- Giving advice, warning, and solutions.
- Praising God, royalties and those in power.
- Pleading for mercy and forgiveness.
- Lamenting wrong decisions or bad luck.
- Providing riddles, laying questions, challenges.
- Criticizing elements of life, wondering.
- Expressing feelings to others or one's self: happiness, sadness, anxiety, surprise, anger.

In a typical example, expressing feelings of happiness to oneself from Night 203, Prince Qamar Al-Zaman, standing outside the castle, wants to inform Queen Bodour of his arrival. He wraps his ring in a paper and hands it to the servant, who delivers it to the Queen. When she opens it and sees the ring, joy conquers her, and out of happiness she chants this poem:

Original Arabic

وَلَقدْ نَدِمْتُ عَلى تَفَرُّقِ شَمْلِنا\\دَهْرًا وَفاضَ الدَّمْعُ مِنْ أَجْفاني
وَنَذَرْتُ إِنْ عادَ الزَّمانُ يَلُمُّنا\\لا عُدْتُ أَذْكُرُ فُرْقَةً بِلِساني
هَجَمَ السُّرورُ عَلَيَّ حَتَّى أَنَّهُ\\مِنْ فَرَطِ ما سَرَّني أَبْكاني
يا عَيْنُ صارَ الدَّمْعُ مِنْكِ سِجْيَةً\\تَبْكينَ مِنْ فَرَحٍ وَأَحْزاني

Wa-laqad nadimtu 'alá tafarruqi shamlinā
Dahran wa-fāḍa ad-dam'u min ajfānī
Wa-nadhartu in 'āda az-zamānu yalummunā
la 'udtu adhkuru furqatan bi-lisānī
Hajama as-surūru 'alayya ḥattá annahu
min faraṭi mā sarranī abkānī
Yā 'aynu ṣāra ad-dam'u minki sijyatan
tabkīna min faraḥin wa-aḥzānī

Translations

Burton's verse translation
And I have regretted the separation of our companionship
An eon, and tears flooded my eyes
And I've sworn if time brought us back together
I'll never utter any separation with my tongue
Joy conquered me to the point of
which it made me happy that I cried
Oh eye, the tears out of you became a principle
You cry out of joy and out of sadness

Literal translation
Long, long have I bewailed the sev'rance of our loves,
With tears that from my lids streamed down like burning rain
And vowed that, if the days deign reunite us two,
My lips should never speak of severance again:
Joy hath o'erwhelmed me so that,
for the very stress Of that which gladdens me to weeping I am fain.
Tears are become to you a habit, O my eyes,
So that ye weep as well for gladness as for pain.

== In world culture ==
The influence of the versions of The Nights on world literature is immense. Writers as diverse as Henry Fielding to Naguib Mahfouz have alluded to the collection by name in their own works. Other writers who have been influenced by the Nights include John Barth, Jorge Luis Borges, A. S. Byatt, Italo Calvino, Angela Carter, Constantine P. Cavafy, Wilkie Collins, Arthur Conan Doyle, Alexandre Dumas, Gustave Flaubert, Elizabeth Gaskell, Arthur de Gobineau, Johann Wolfgang von Goethe, Hugo von Hofmannsthal, Victor Hugo, H. P. Lovecraft, Gérard de Nerval, Charles Nodier, Orhan Pamuk, Georges Perec, Marcel Proust, Alexander Pushkin, Salman Rushdie, Marcel Schwob, Walter Scott, Stendhal, William Makepeace Thackeray, Leo Tolstoy, H. G. Wells, and W. B. Yeats.

Various characters from this epic have themselves become cultural icons in Western culture, such as Aladdin, Sinbad and Ali Baba. Part of its popularity may have sprung from improved standards of historical and geographical knowledge. The marvelous beings and events typical of fairy tales seem less incredible if they are set further "long ago" or farther "far away"; this process culminates in the fantasy world having little connection, if any, to actual times and places. Several elements from Arabian mythology are now common in modern fantasy, such as genies, bahamuts, magic carpets, magic lamps, etc. When L. Frank Baum proposed writing a modern fairy tale that banished stereotypical elements, he included the genie as well as the dwarf and the fairy as stereotypes to go.

In 1982, the International Astronomical Union (IAU) began naming features on Saturn's moon Enceladus after characters and places in Burton's translation because "its surface is so strange and mysterious that it was given the Arabian Nights as a name bank, linking fantasy landscape with a literary fantasy."

=== In Arab culture ===
The stories included in the Arabian Nights were very popular among storytellers known locally as the Hakawati. However the Arabian Nights was rarely mentioned in lists of popular literature and few pre-18th-century manuscripts of the collection exist, even though stories that are included in the Nights, such as Sindbad, the Epic of Antar, and other adventures and marvelous voyages, were cited many times. But according to Robert Irwin, the Arabian Nights being written in simple prose had low status in medieval Arabic literature. Irwin writes that "Even today, with the exception of certain writers and academics, the Nights is regarded with disdain in the Arab world. Its stories are regularly denounced as vulgar, improbable, childish and, above all, badly written". However despite the low status of the Nights the story collection had several rivals during the Abbasid period.

The Nights have proved an inspiration to some modern Egyptian writers, such as Tawfiq al-Hakim (author of the Symbolist play Shahrazad, 1934), Taha Hussein (Scheherazade's Dreams, 1943) and Naguib Mahfouz (Arabian Nights and Days, 1979). Idries Shah finds the Abjad numerical equivalent of the Arabic title, alf layla wa layla, in the Arabic phrase ʾumm al-qiṣṣa, meaning 'mother of stories'. He goes on to state that many of the stories "are encoded Sufi teaching stories, descriptions of psychological processes, or enciphered lore of one kind or another".

On a more popular level, film and TV adaptations based on stories like Sinbad and Aladdin enjoyed long lasting popularity in Arabic speaking countries.

=== Early European literature ===
Although the first known translation into a European language appeared in 1704, it is possible that the Nights began exerting its influence on Western culture much earlier. Christian writers in Medieval Spain translated many works from Arabic, mainly philosophy and mathematics, but also Arab fiction, as is evidenced by Juan Manuel's story collection El Conde Lucanor and Ramón Llull's The Book of Beasts.

Knowledge of the work, direct or indirect, apparently spread beyond Spain. Themes and motifs with parallels in the Nights are found in Chaucer's The Canterbury Tales (in The Squire's Tale the hero travels on a flying brass horse) and Boccaccio's Decameron. Echoes in Giovanni Sercambi's Novelle and Ariosto's Orlando Furioso suggest that the story of Shahriyar and Shahzaman was also known. Evidence also appears to show that the stories had spread to the Balkans and a translation of the Nights into Romanian existed by the 17th century, itself based on a Greek version of the collection.

=== Western literature (18th century onwards) ===
==== Galland translations (1700s) ====
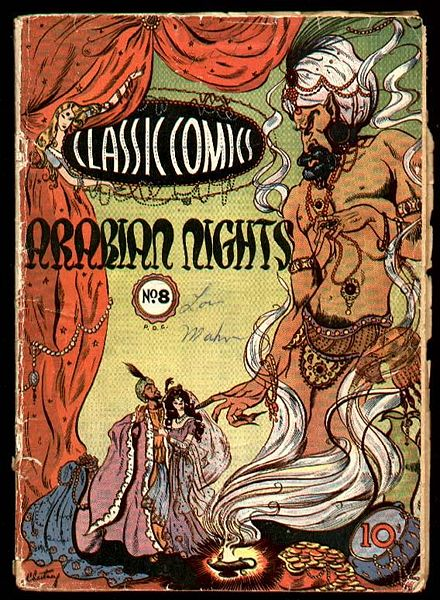
Classic Comics issue #8

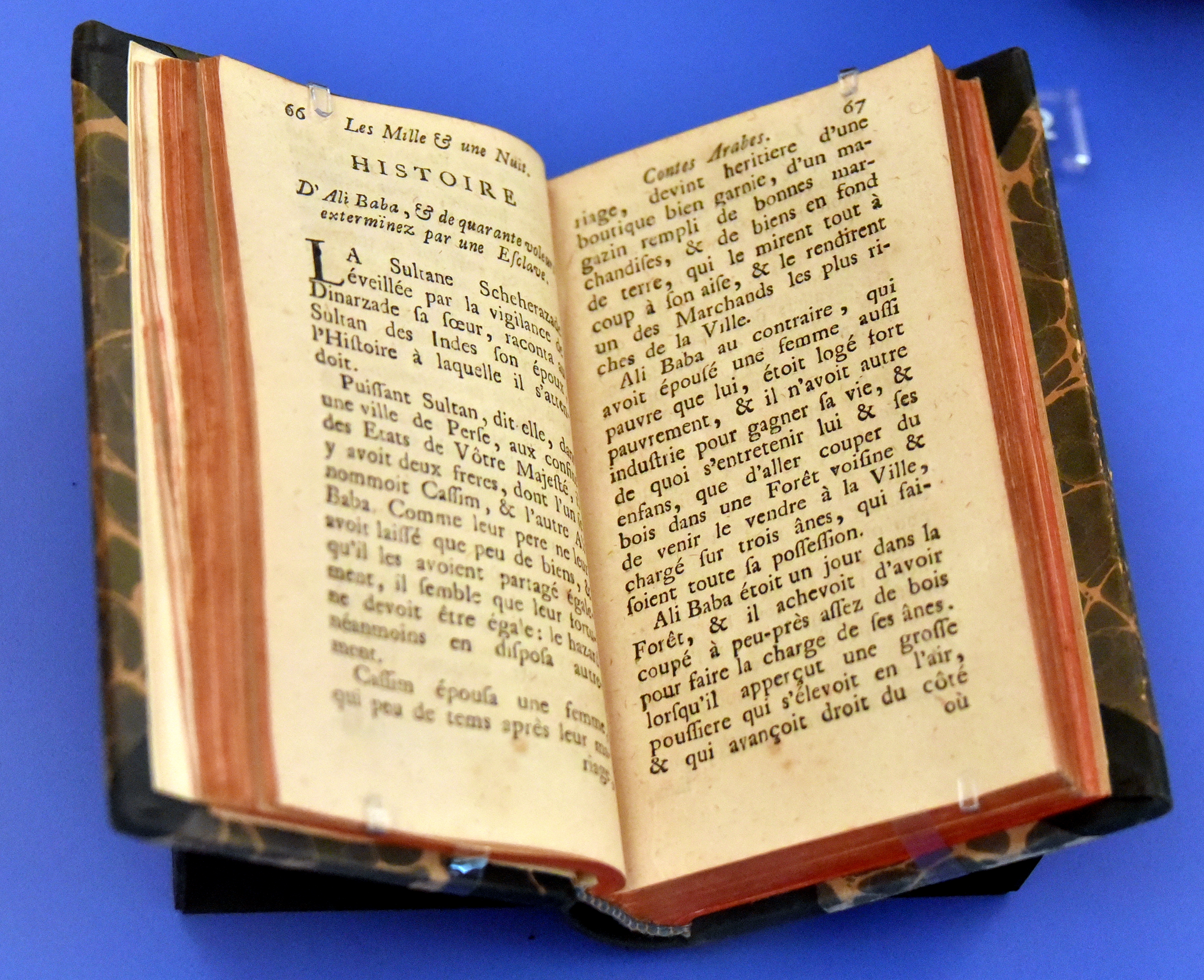
First European edition of Arabian Nights, "Les Mille et une Nuit", by Antoine Galland, Vol. 11, 1730 CE, Paris

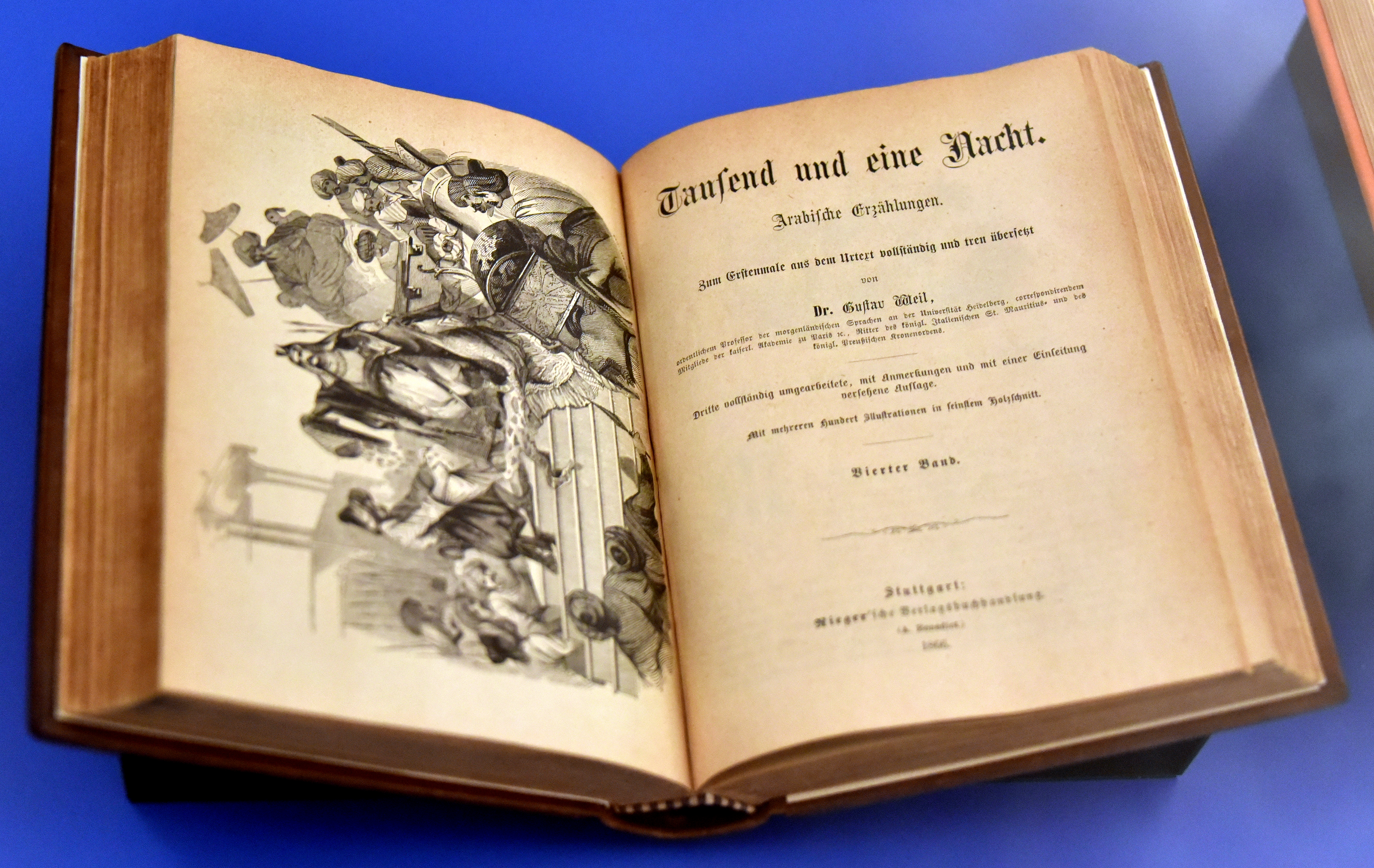
Arabian Nights, "Tausend und eine Nacht. Arabische Erzählungen", translated into German by Gustav Weil, Vol .4, 1866 CE, Stuttgart

The modern fame of the Nights derives from the first known European translation by Antoine Galland, which appeared in 1704. According to Robert Irwin, Galland "played so large a part in discovering the tales, in popularizing them in Europe and in shaping what would come to be regarded as the canonical collection that, at some risk of hyperbole and paradox, he has been called the real author of the Nights".

The immediate success of Galland's version with the French public may have been because it coincided with the vogue for contes de fées ('fairy stories'). This fashion began with the publication of Madame d'Aulnoy's Histoire d'Hypolite in 1690. D'Aulnoy's book has a remarkably similar structure to the Nights, with the tales told by a female narrator. The success of the Nights spread across Europe and by the end of the century there were translations of Galland into English, German, Italian, Dutch, Danish, Russian, Flemish and Yiddish.

Galland's version provoked a spate of pseudo-Oriental imitations. At the same time, some French writers began to parody the style and concoct far-fetched stories in superficially Oriental settings. These tongue-in-cheek pastiches include Anthony Hamilton's Les quatre Facardins (1730), Crébillon's Le sopha (1742) and Diderot's Les bijoux indiscrets (1748). They often contained veiled allusions to contemporary French society. The most famous example is Voltaire's Zadig (1748), an attack on religious bigotry set against a vague pre-Islamic Middle Eastern background. The English versions of the "Oriental Tale" generally contained a heavy moralising element, with the notable exception of William Beckford's fantasy Vathek (1786), which had a decisive influence on the development of the Gothic novel. The Polish nobleman Jan Potocki's novel Saragossa Manuscript (begun 1797) owes a deep debt to the Nights with its Oriental flavour and labyrinthine series of embedded tales.

The work was included on a price list of books on theology, history, and cartography, which was sent by the Scottish bookseller Andrew Millar (then an apprentice) to a Presbyterian minister. This is illustrative of the title's widespread popularity and availability in the 1720s.

==== 19th century–20th century ====
The Nights continued to be a favourite book of many British authors of the Romantic and Victorian eras. According to A. S. Byatt, "In British Romantic poetry the Arabian Nights stood for the wonderful against the mundane, the imaginative against the prosaically and reductively rational." In their autobiographical writings, both Coleridge and de Quincey refer to nightmares the book had caused them when young. Wordsworth and Tennyson also wrote about their childhood reading of the tales in their poetry. Charles Dickens was another enthusiast and the atmosphere of the Nights pervades the opening of his last novel The Mystery of Edwin Drood (1870).

Several writers have attempted to add a thousand and second tale, including Théophile Gautier (La mille deuxième nuit, 1842) and Joseph Roth (Die Geschichte von der 1002 Nacht, 1939). Edgar Allan Poe wrote "The Thousand-and-Second Tale of Scheherazade" (1845), a short story depicting the eighth and final voyage of Sinbad the Sailor, along with the various mysteries Sinbad and his crew encounter; the anomalies are then described as footnotes to the story. While the king is uncertain—except in the case of the elephants carrying the world on the back of the turtle—that these mysteries are real, they are actual modern events that occurred in various places during, or before, Poe's lifetime. The story ends with the king in such disgust at the tale Scheherazade has just woven, that he has her executed the very next day.

Another important literary figure, the Irish poet W. B. Yeats, was also fascinated by the Arabian Nights, when he wrote in his prose book, A Vision an autobiographical poem, titled The Gift of Harun Al-Rashid, in relation to his joint experiments with his wife Georgie Hyde-Lees, with automatic writing, a technique used by many occultists in order to discern messages from the subconscious mind or from other spiritual beings, when the hand moves a pencil or a pen, writing only on a simple sheet of paper and when the person's eyes are shut. Also, the gifted and talented wife is playing in Yeats's poem as "a gift" herself, given only allegedly by the caliph to the Christian and Byzantine philosopher Qusta Ibn Luqa, who acts in the poem as a personification of W. B. Yeats. In July 1934 he was asked by Louis Lambert, while on a tour in the United States, which six books satisfied him most. The list that he gave placed the Arabian Nights second only to William Shakespeare's works.

Modern authors influenced by the Nights include James Joyce, Marcel Proust, Jorge Luis Borges, John Barth and Ted Chiang.

=== Film, radio and television ===
Aladdin and the Wonderful Lamp (1917)

Stories from the One Thousand and One Nights have been popular subjects for films, beginning with Georges Méliès' Le Palais des Mille et une nuits (1905).

The critic Robert Irwin singles out the two versions of The Thief of Baghdad (1924 version directed by Raoul Walsh; 1940 version produced by Alexander Korda) and Pier Paolo Pasolini's Il fiore delle Mille e una notte (1974) as ranking "high among the masterpieces of world cinema." Michael James Lundell calls Il fiore "the most faithful adaptation, in its emphasis on sexuality, of The 1001 Nights in its oldest form".

Alif Laila (transl. One Thousand Nights; 1933) was a Hindi-language fantasy film based on One Thousand and One Nights from the early era of Indian cinema, directed by Balwant Bhatt and Shanti Dave. K. Amarnath made Alif Laila (1953), another Indian fantasy film in Hindi based on the folktale of Aladdin. Niren Lahiri's Arabian Nights, an adventure-fantasy film adaptation of the stories, released in 1946. A number of Indian films based on the Nights and The Thief of Baghdad were produced over the years, including Baghdad Ka Chor (1946), Baghdad Thirudan (1960), and Baghdad Gaja Donga (1968). A television series, Thief of Baghdad, was also made in India, which aired on Zee TV between 2000 and 2001.

UPA, an American animation studio, produced an animated feature version of 1001 Arabian Nights (1959), featuring the cartoon character Mr. Magoo.

The 1949 animated film The Singing Princess, another movie produced in Italy, is inspired by The Arabian Nights. The animated feature film, One Thousand and One Arabian Nights (1969), produced in Japan and directed by Osamu Tezuka and Eichii Yamamoto, featured psychedelic imagery and sounds, and erotic material intended for adults.

Alif Laila (The Arabian Nights), a 1993–1997 Indian TV series based on the stories from One Thousand and One Nights produced by Sagar Entertainment Ltd and aired on DD National, starts with Scheherazade telling her stories to Shahryār, and contains both the well-known and the lesser-known stories from One Thousand and One Nights. Another Indian television series, Alif Laila, based on various stories from the collection, aired on Dangal TV in 2020.

Alf Leila Wa Leila, Egyptian television adaptations of the stories, was broadcast between the 1980s and early 1990s, with each series featuring a cast of big-name Egyptian performers such as Hussein Fahmy, Raghda, Laila Elwi, Yousuf Shaaban, Nelly, Sherihan and Yehia El-Fakharany. Each series premiered on every yearly month of Ramadan between the 1980s and 1990s.

One of the best-known Arabian Nights-based films is the 1992 Walt Disney animated movie Aladdin, which is loosely based on the story of the same name.

Arabian Nights (2000), a two-part television mini-series adopted for BBC and ABC studios, starring Mili Avital, Dougray Scott, and John Leguizamo, and directed by Steve Barron, is based on the translation by Sir Richard Francis Burton.

Shabnam Rezaei and Aly Jetha created, and the Vancouver-based Big Bad Boo Studios produced, 1001 Nights (2011), an animated television series for children, which launched on Teletoon and airs in 80 countries around the world, including Discovery Kids Asia.

Arabian Nights (2015, in Portuguese: As Mil e uma Noites), a three-part film directed by Miguel Gomes, is based on One Thousand and One Nights.

Alf Leila Wa Leila, a popular Egyptian radio adaptation, was broadcast on Egyptian radio stations for 26 years. Directed by famed radio director Mohamed Mahmoud Shabaan, also known by his nickname "Baba Sharoon", the series featured a cast of respected Egyptian actors, among them Zouzou Nabil as Scheherazade and Abdelrahim El Zarakany as Shahryar.

Aladdin (2019) is a musical fantasy film directed by Guy Ritchie from a screenplay he co-wrote with John August. Co-produced by Walt Disney Pictures and Rideback, it is a live-action remake of Disney's 1992 animated feature film of the same title.

Aladdin 3477: The Jinn of Wisdom (2025) is the first in a trilogy of live-action sci-fi films written and directed by Star Wars artist Matt Busch. The films take place 1,500 years in the future, yet stay closer to the original Arabian Nights tale than the Disney versions, including taking place in Asia.

=== Music ===
The Nights has inspired many pieces of music, including:

Classical

- François-Adrien Boieldieu: Le calife de Bagdad (1800)
- Carl Maria von Weber: Abu Hassan (1811)
- Luigi Cherubini: Ali Baba (1833)
- Robert Schumann: Scheherazade (1848)
- Peter Cornelius: Der Barbier von Bagdad (1858)
- Ernest Reyer: La statue (1861)
- C. F. E. Horneman: Aladdin (overture), (1864)
- Nikolai Rimsky-Korsakov: Scheherazade Op. 35 (1888)
- Johann Strauss II: Indigo und die vierzig Räuber (1871)
- Johann Strauss II: Tausend und eine Nacht (1871)
- Tigran Chukhajian: Zemire (1891)
- Maurice Ravel: Shéhérazade (1898)
- Ferrucio Busoni: Piano Concerto in C major (1904)
- Henri Rabaud: Mârouf, savetier du Caire (1914)
- Carl Nielsen: Aladdin suite (1918–1919)
- Collegium musicum: Suita po tisic a jednej noci (1969)
- Fikret Amirov: Arabian Nights (ballet, 1979)
- Ezequiel Viñao: La noche de las noches (1990)
- Carl Davis: Aladdin (ballet, 1999)
- John Adams: Scheherazade.2 (2015)

Pop, rock, and metal

- Umm Kulthum: "Alf leila wa leila" (1969)
- Renaissance: Scheherazade and Other Stories (1975)
- Doce: "Ali-Bábá, um homem das Arábias" (1981)
- Icehouse: "No Promises" (from the album Measure for Measure) (1986)
- Kamelot: "Nights of Arabia" (from the album The Fourth Legacy) (1999)
- Sarah Brightman: "Harem" and "Arabian Nights" (from the album Harem) (2003)
- Almora "Shehrâzad" (from the album Shehrâzad) (2004)
- Ch!pz: "1001 Arabian Nights (song)" (from the album The World of Ch!pz) (2006)
- Nightwish: "Sahara" (2007)
- Rock On!!: "Sinbad the Sailor" (2008)
- Panda Bear: "Scheherazade" (2011)
- Abney Park: "Scheherazade" (2013)

Musical theatre

- "A Thousand and One Nights" (from Twisted: The Untold Story of a Royal Vizier) (2013)
- Ghost Quartet (2014)

=== Theatre ===
The Thousand and One Nights was adapted into a stage play by Ghina Fawaz. The adaptation blends Arabic folklore with contemporary stories, confronting the impact of colonialism while celebrating the resilience of Indigenous communities worldwide through its use of Hakawati oral tradition, poetry, puppetry, and music. It was first performed at Columbia University in 2025. It received a workshop at La Mama Experimental Theatre Club in 2026.

=== Games ===
Popular modern games with an Arabian Nights theme include the Prince of Persia series, Crash Bandicoot: Warped, Sonic and the Secret Rings, Disney's Aladdin, Bookworm Adventures, and the pinball table Tales of the Arabian Nights. Additionally, the popular card game Magic: The Gathering released an expansion set titled Arabian Nights.

Sultan's Game, developed by Double Cross and released for Steam on March 30, 2025, is “a card-based simulation and narrative game, inspired by The One Thousand and One Nights,” in which players are commanded by the Sultan “to play a cruel game. Each week you draw a card, and have to complete its challenge within seven days. Forced to make dreadful choices to beat the Sultan's Game and save your own life, you will have to find a way to survive not just the Game, but its consequences too.” In addition to the challenges imposed by the Sultan, the game includes a variety of narrative events that explore themes such as survival, betrayal, ambition, lust, and poetic justice. Just over three months after its release, the game surpassed one million copies sold.

=== Illustrators ===
Many artists have illustrated the Arabian Nights, including Pierre-Clément Marillier for Le Cabinet des Fées (1785–1789), Gustave Doré, Léon Carré (Granville, 1878 – Alger, 1942), Roger Blachon, Françoise Boudignon, André Dahan, Amato Soro, Albert Robida, Alcide Théophile Robaudi and Marcelino Truong; Vittorio Zecchin (Murano, 1878 – Murano, 1947) and Emanuele Luzzati; The German Morgan; Mohammed Racim (Algiers, 1896 – Algiers 1975), Sani ol-Molk (1849–1856), Anton Pieck and Emre Orhun, Virginia Frances Sterrett (1928).

Famous illustrators for British editions include Arthur Boyd Houghton, John Tenniel, John Everett Millais and George John Pinwell for Dalziel's Illustrated Arabian Nights Entertainments, published in 1865; Walter Crane for Aladdin's Picture Book (1876); Frank Brangwyn for the 1896 edition of Lane's translation; Albert Letchford for the 1897 edition of Burton's translation; Edmund Dulac for Stories from the Arabian Nights (1907), Princess Badoura (1913) and Sindbad the Sailor & Other Tales from the Arabian Nights (1914). Others artists include John D. Batten, (Fairy Tales From The Arabian Nights, 1893), Kay Nielsen, Eric Fraser, Errol le Cain, Maxfield Parrish, W. Heath Robinson and Arthur Szyk (1954).

=== Comic books ===
- Classics Illustrated #8 (1947) – abridged version of One Thousand and One Nights in comic book form.
- Carl Barks, the creator of Scrooge McDuck, wrote two substantial adventure stories based on the Nights.
- "Desert Shadows", Wet Dreams (Heavy Metal, 2000), by Alfonso Azpiri.
- "Ramadan", The Sandman #50 (DC Vertigo, June 1993), by Neil Gaiman (story) and P. Craig Russell (art).
- One Thousand and One Nights by Jeon Jin Seok (story) and Han Seughee (art) – a manhwa rewriting of the Nights for female Korean teenagers.
- Les 1001 nuits de Scheherazade. Paris: Albin Michel, 2001, by Eric Maltaite.
- 2001 Nights - 1984 science-fiction manga by Yukinobu Hoshino about humanity's venture into deep space. Similar to the Nights, it consists of several loosely connected short stories.

== Gallery ==
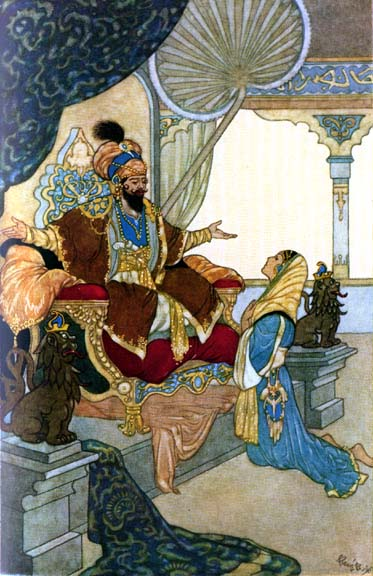
The Sultan

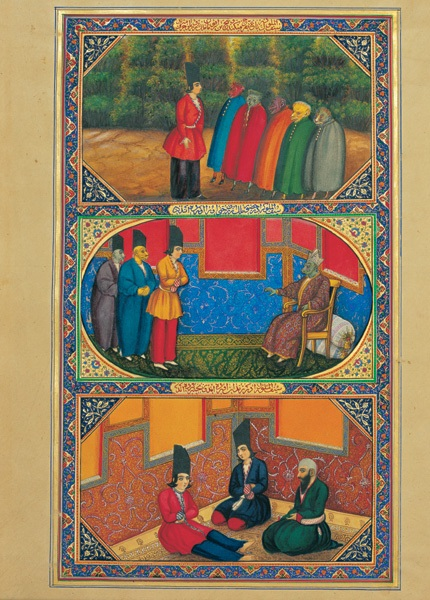
One Thousand and One Nights book

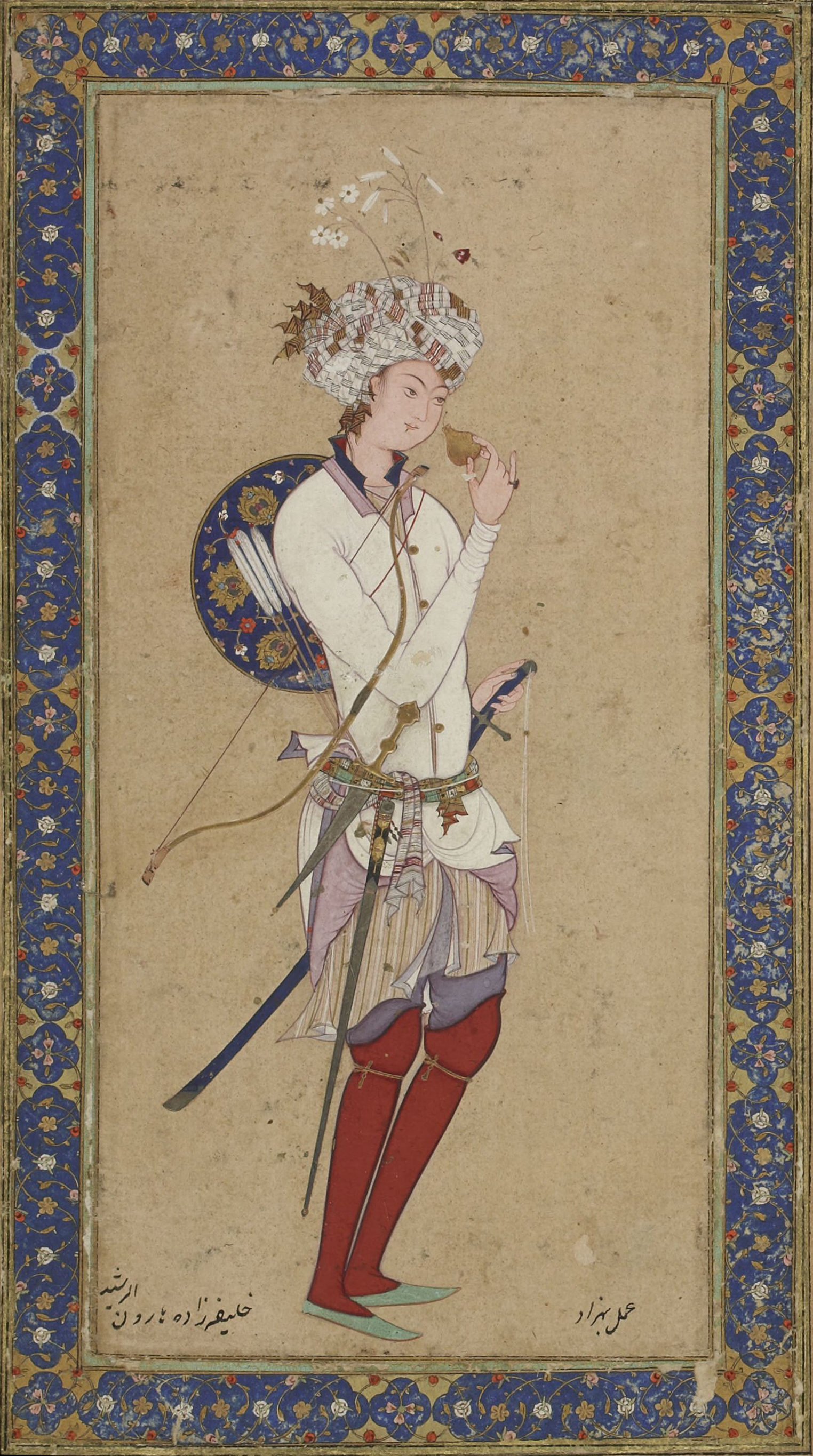
Harun ar-Rashid, a leading character of the 1001 Nights

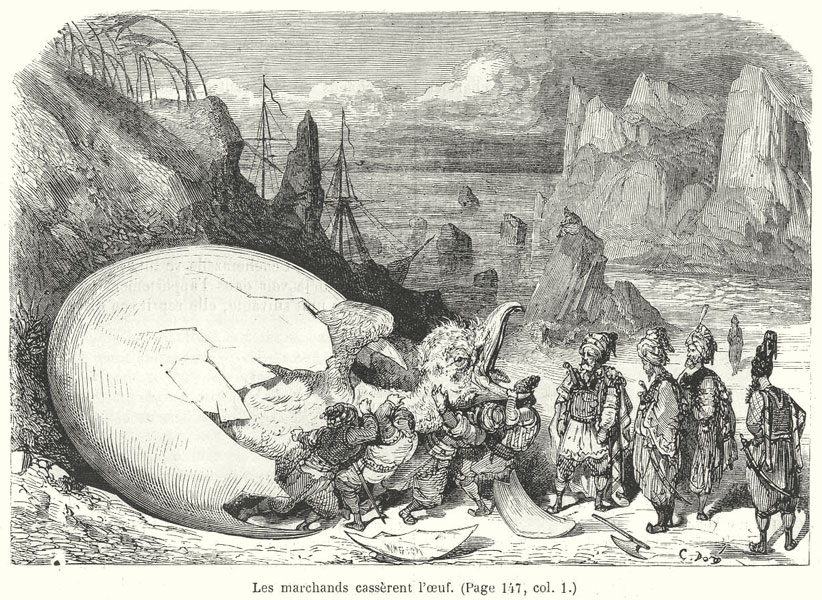
The fifth voyage of Sindbad

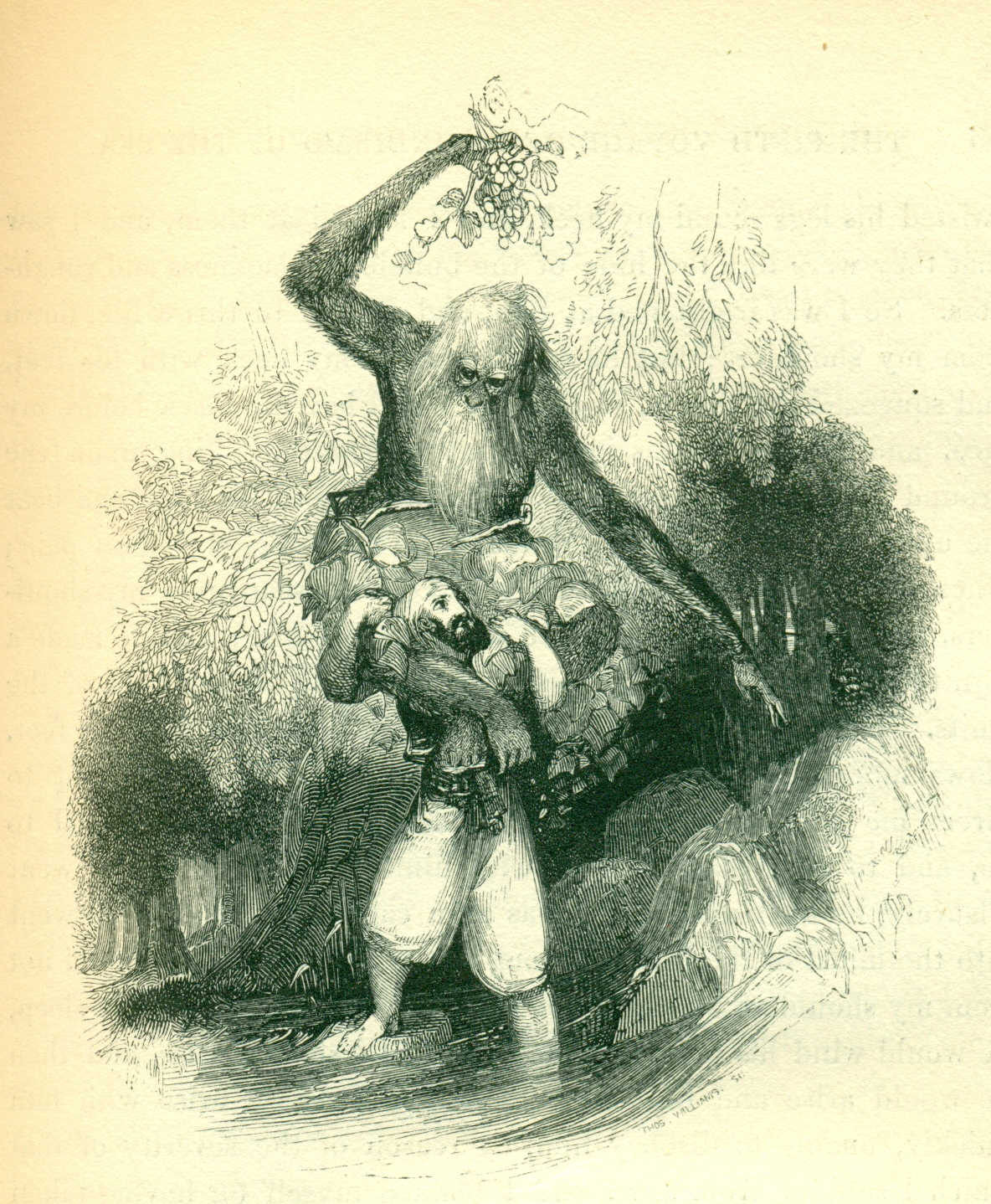
William Harvey, The Fifth Voyage of Es-Sindbad of the Sea, 1838–40, woodcut

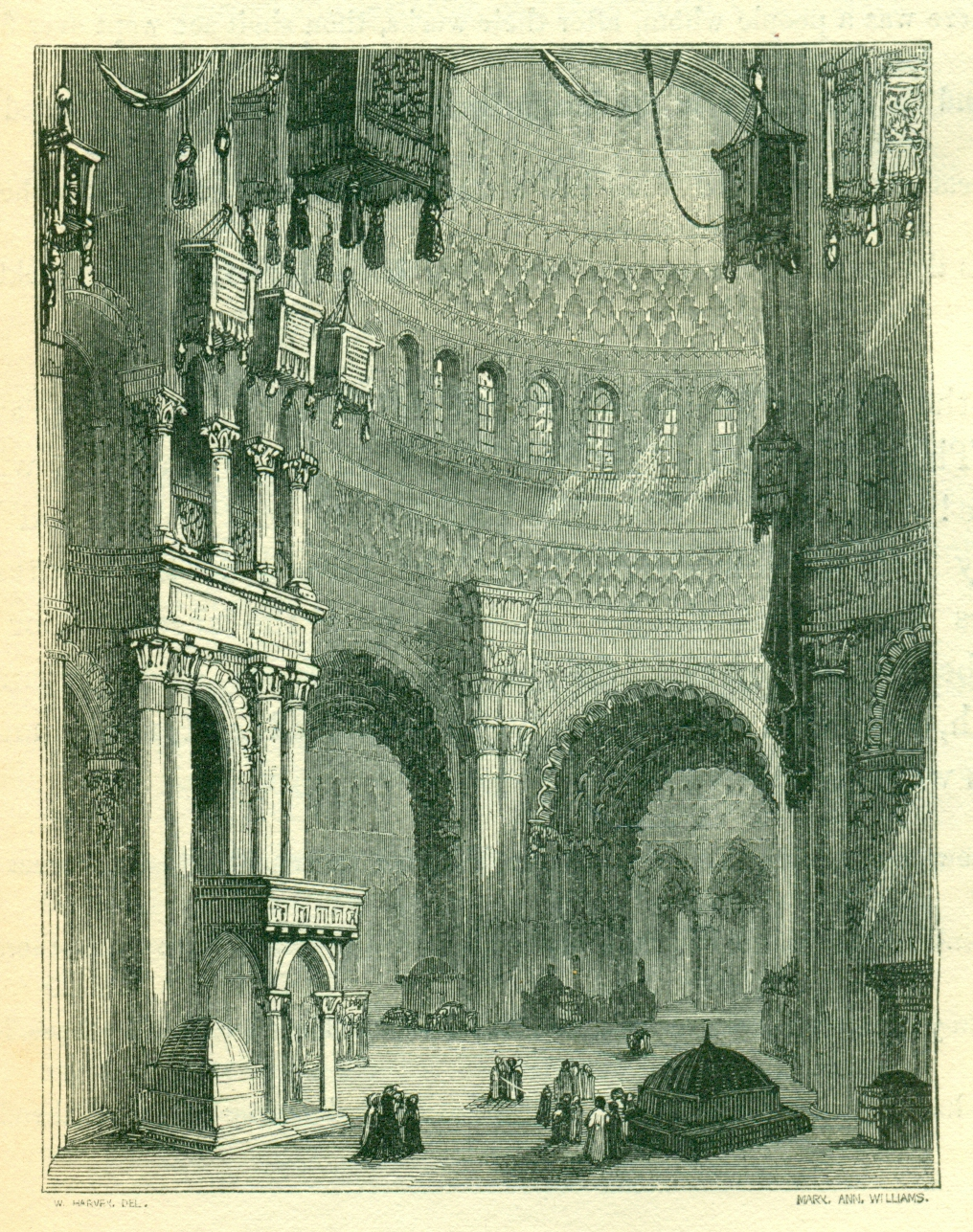
William Harvey, The Story of the City of Brass, 1838–40, woodcut

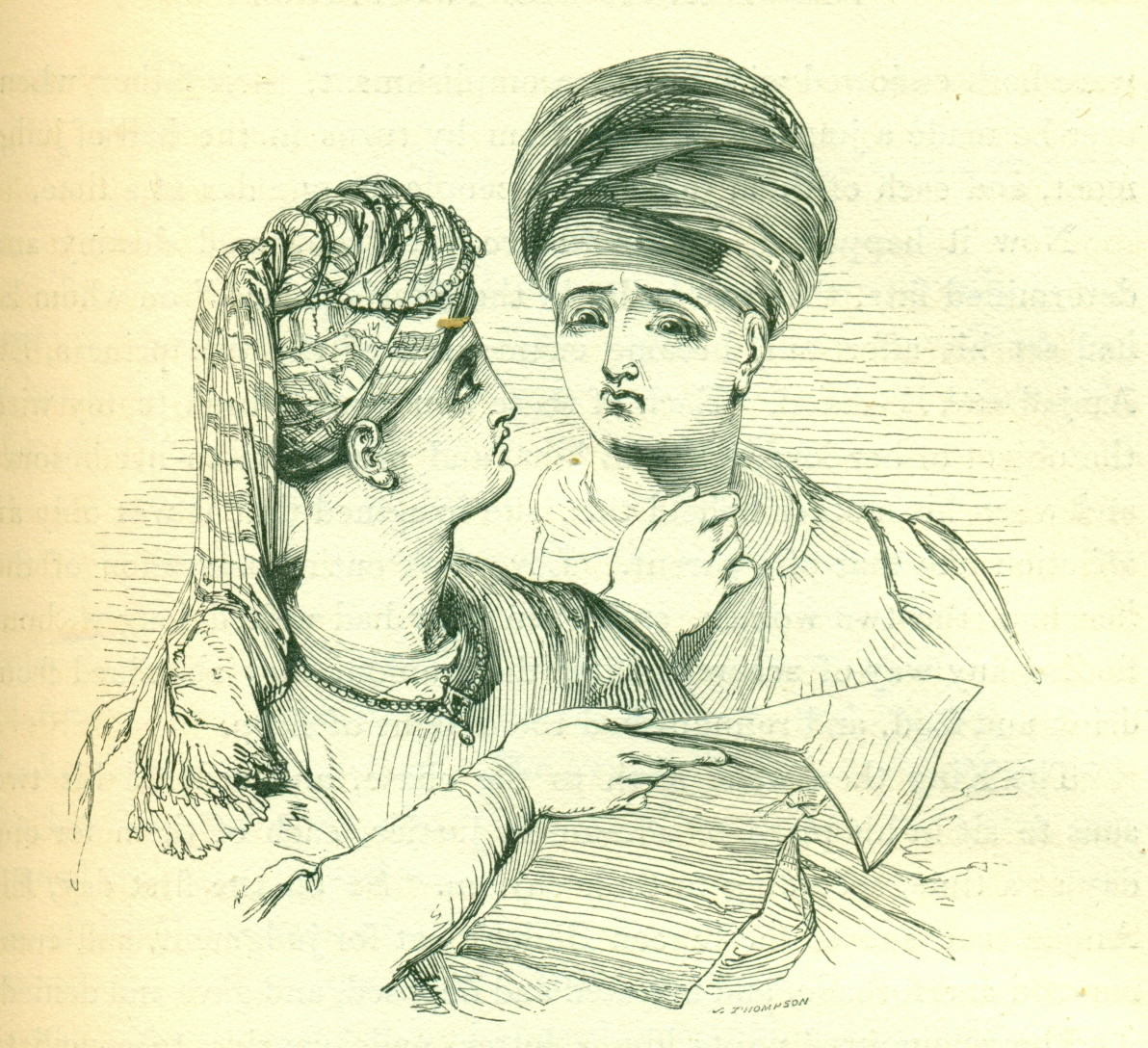
William Harvey, The Story of the Two Princes El-Amjad and El-As'ad, 1838–40, woodcut

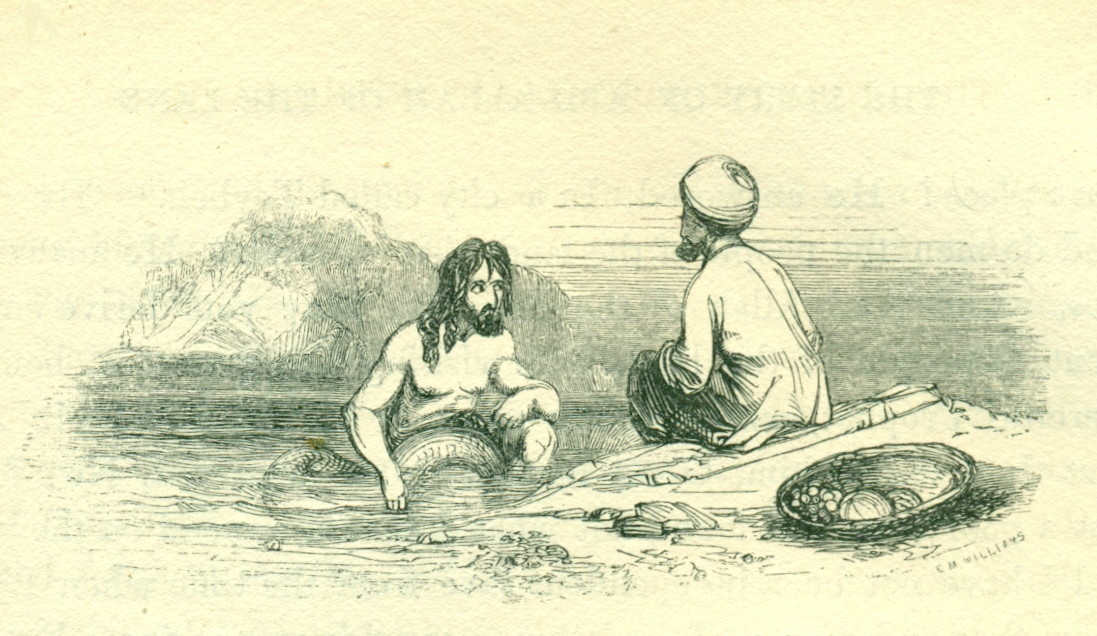
William Harvey, The Story of Abd Allah of the Land and Abd Allah of the Sea

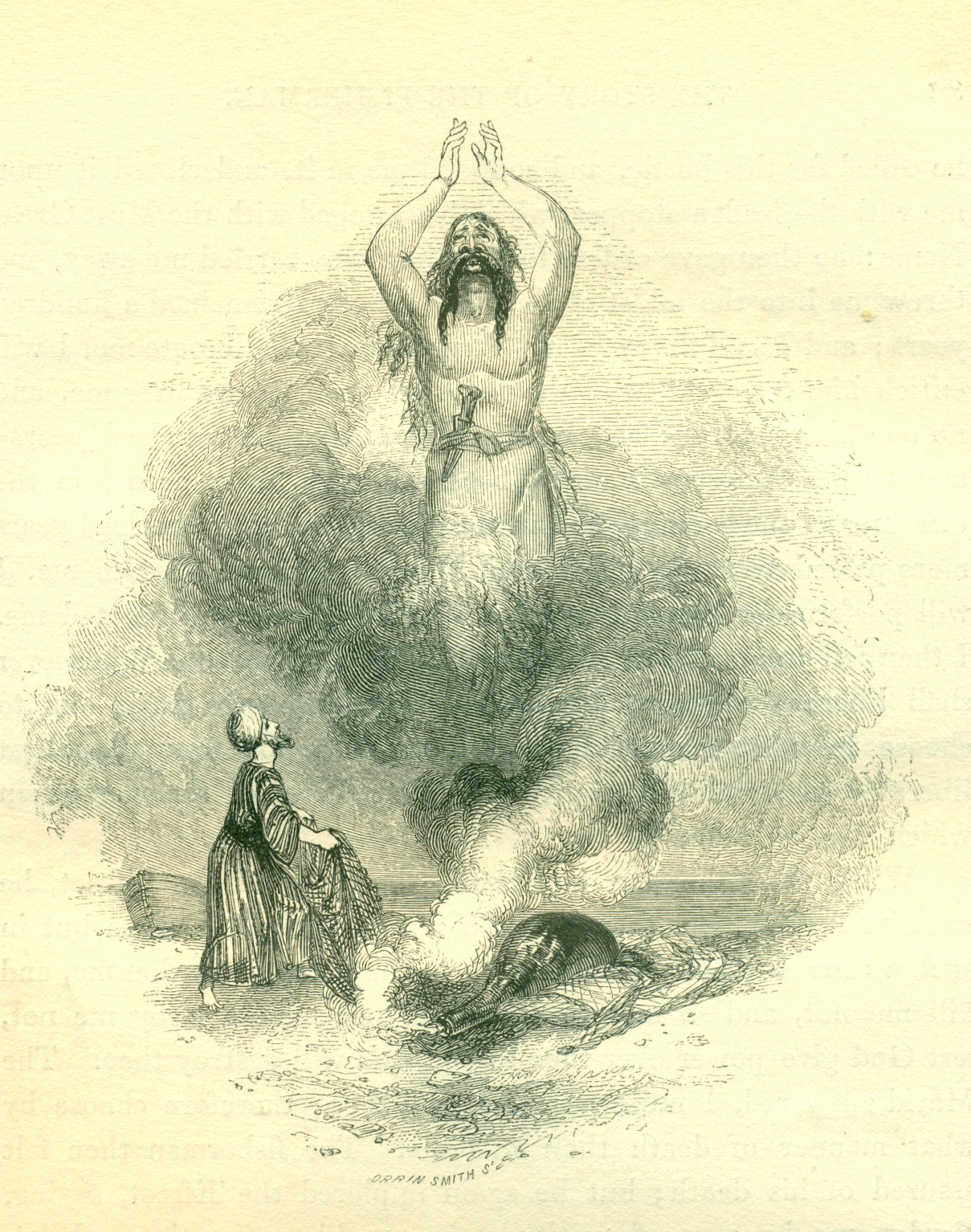
William Harvey, The Story of the Fisherman, 1838–40, woodcut

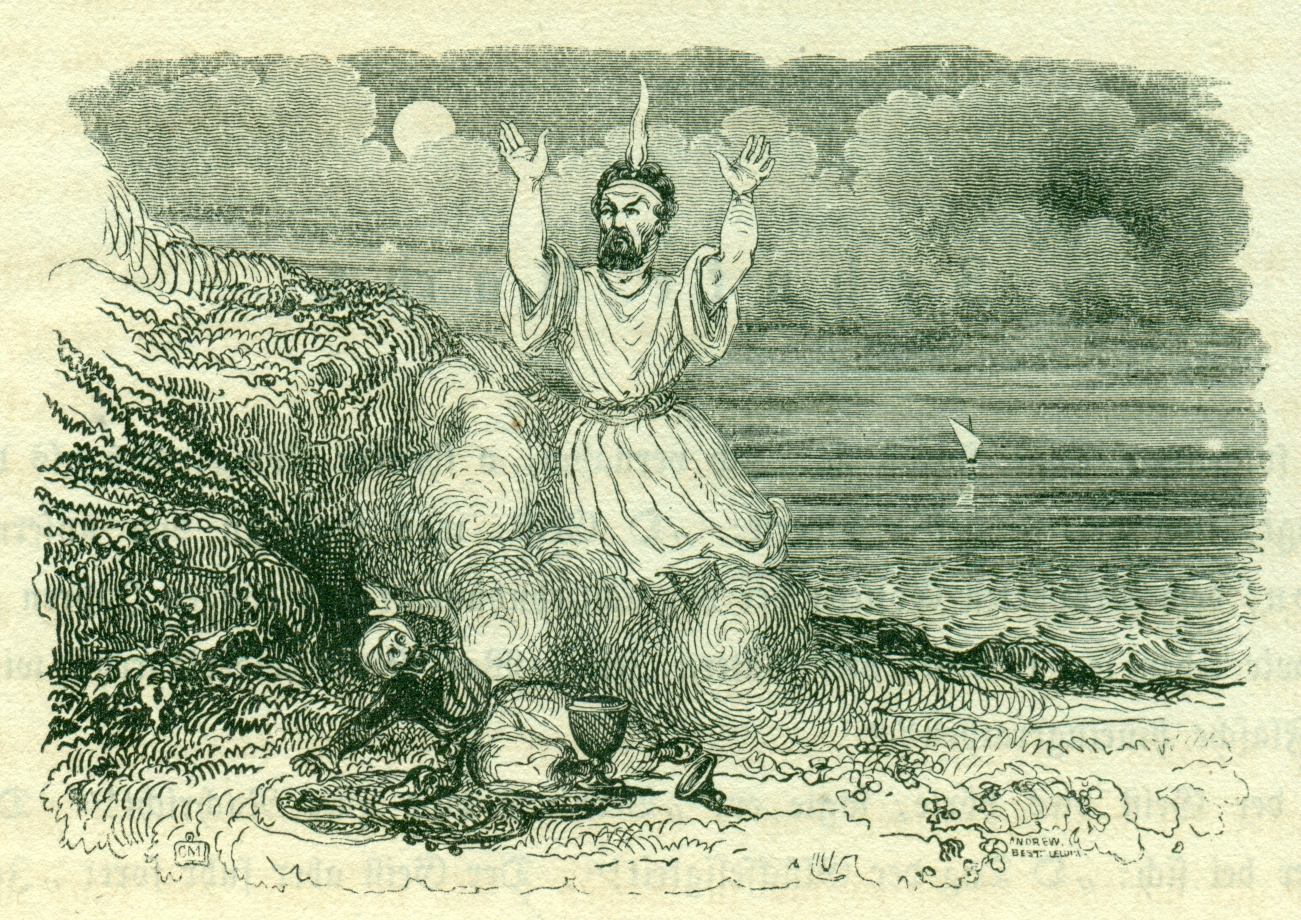
Friedrich Gross, ante 1830, woodcut

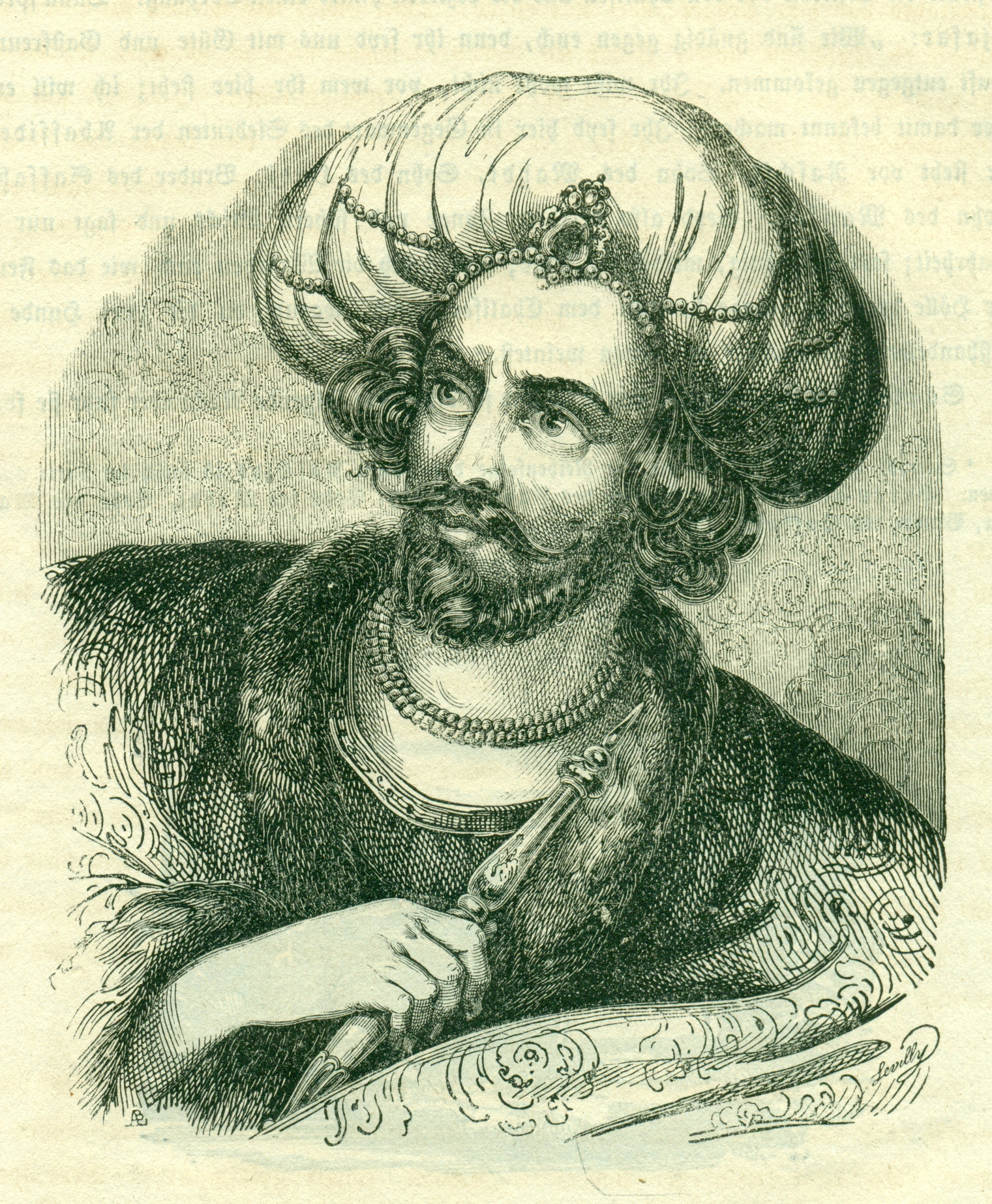
Friedrich Gross, ante 1830, woodcut

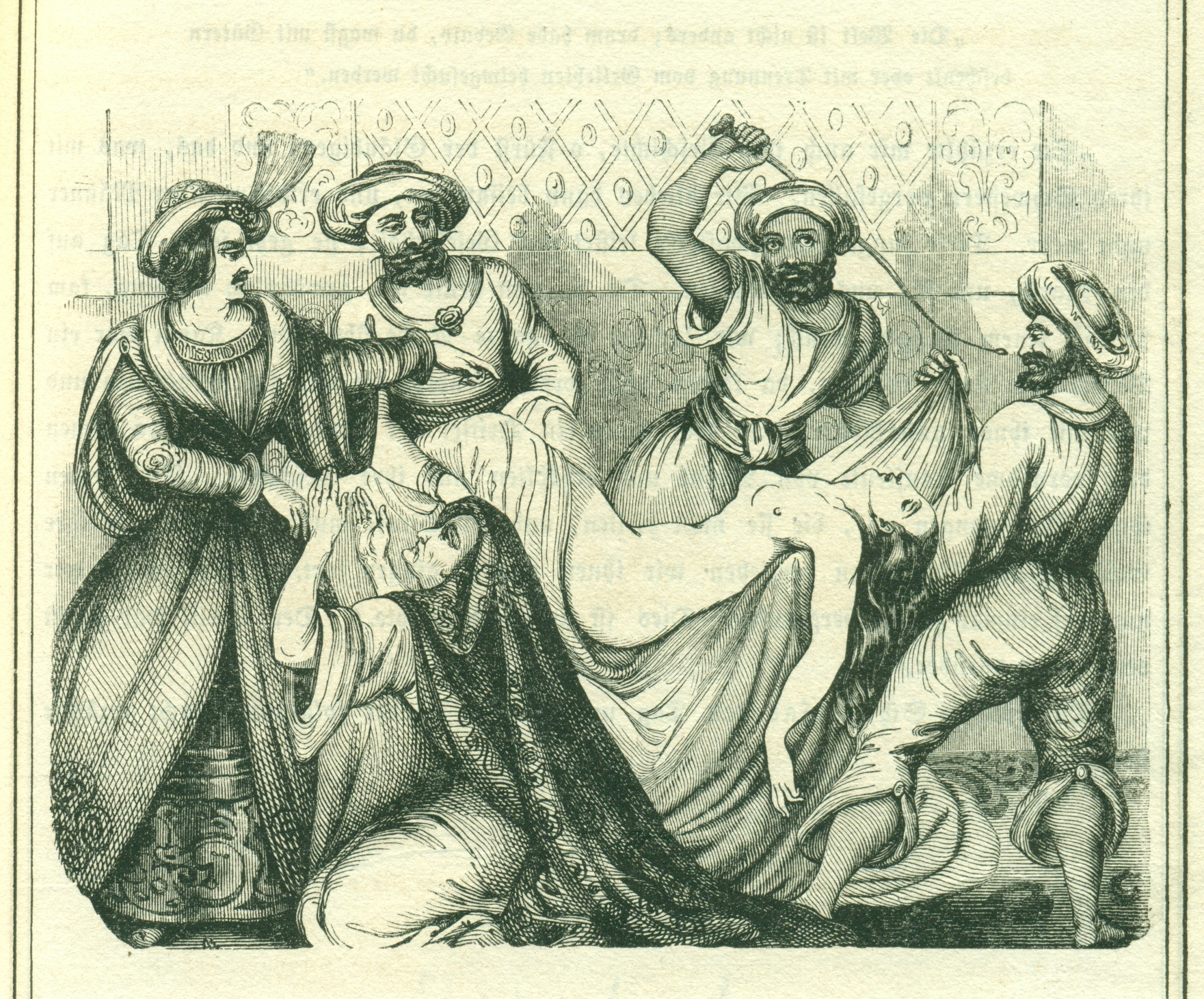
Friedrich Gross, ante 1830, woodcut

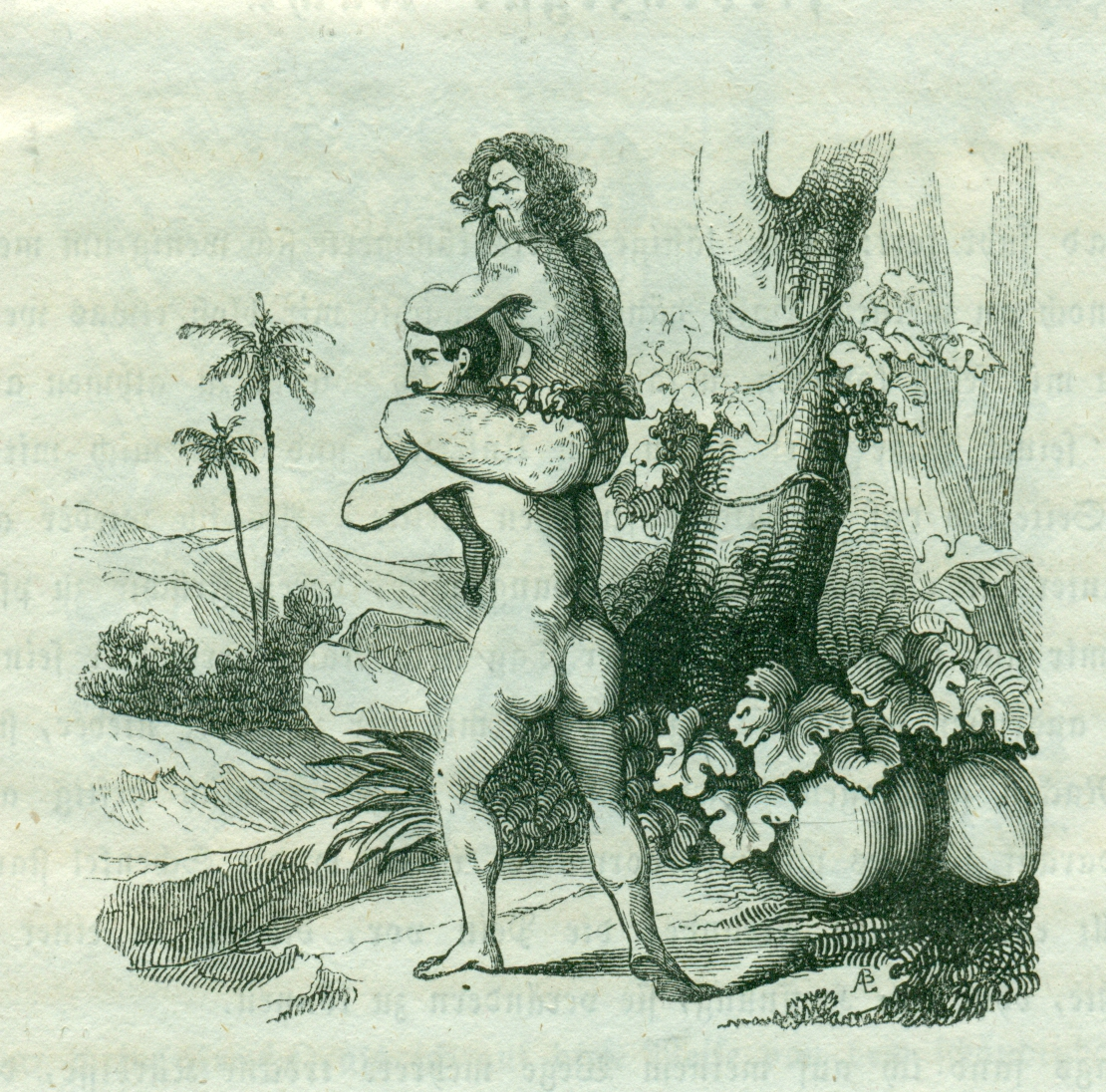
Friedrich Gross, ante 1830, woodcut

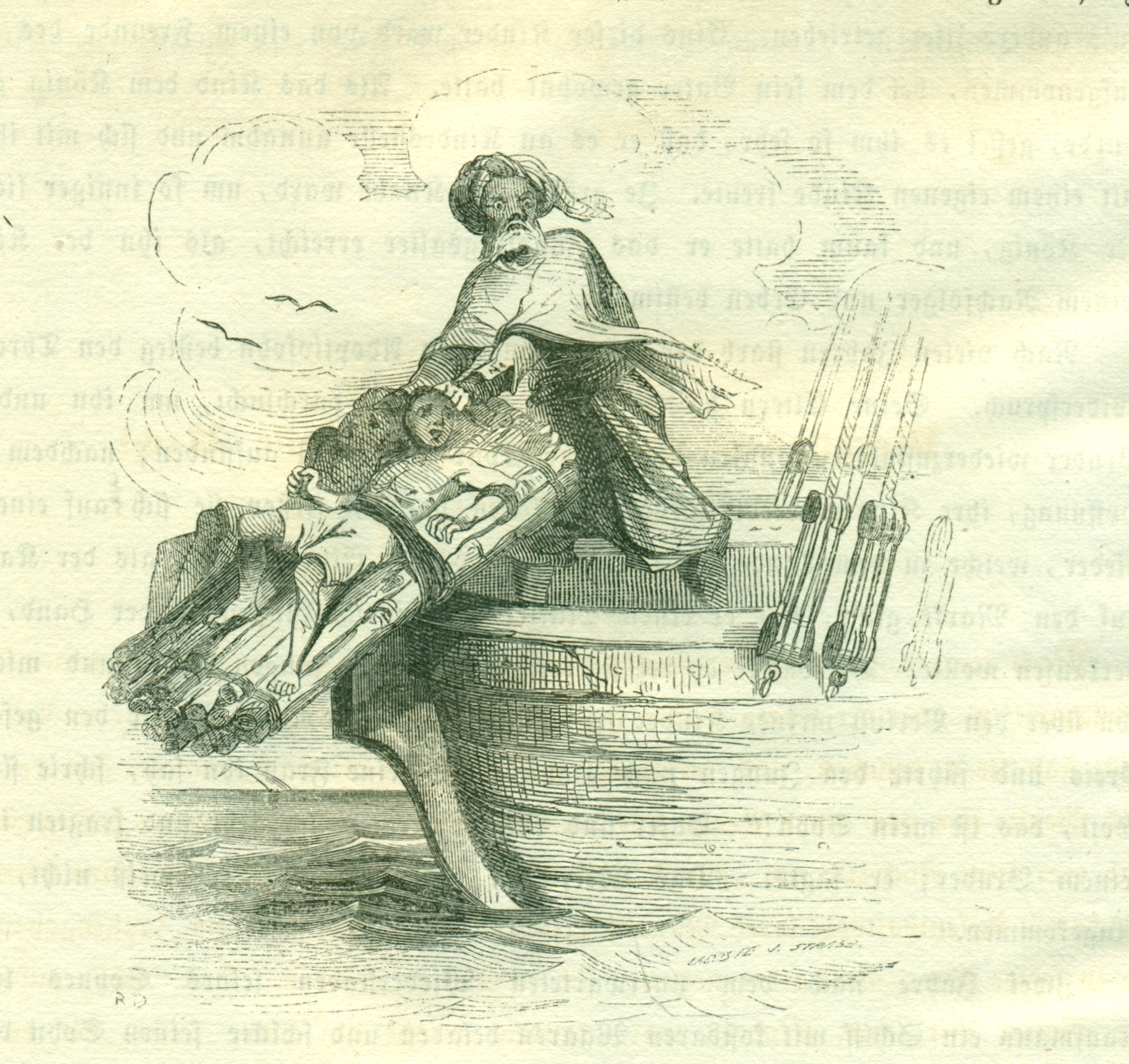
Friedrich Gross, ante 1830, woodcut

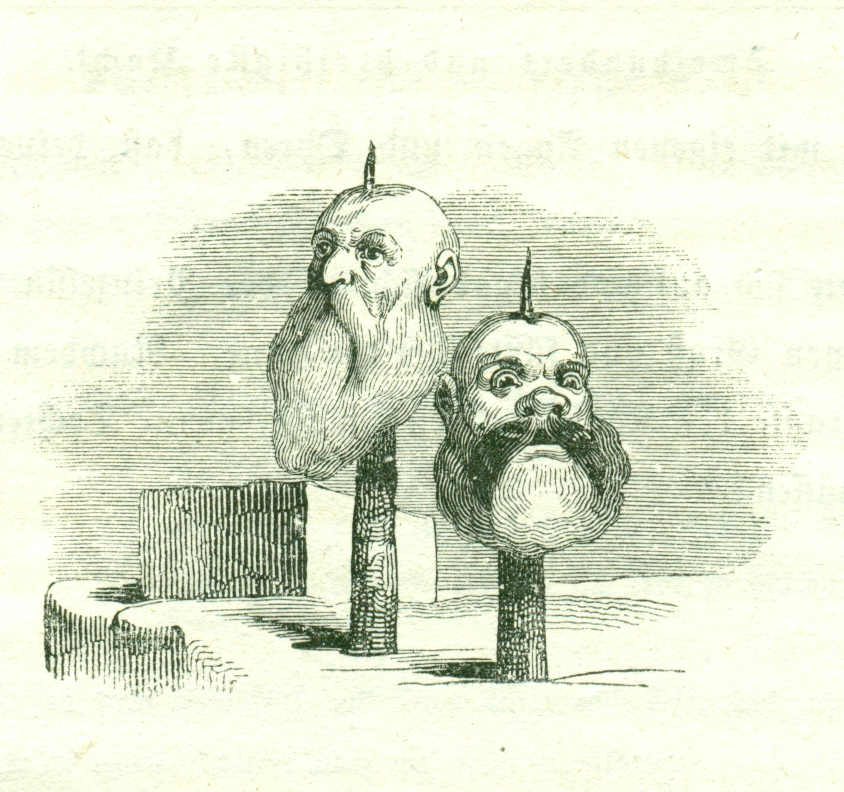
Friedrich Gross, ante 1830, woodcut

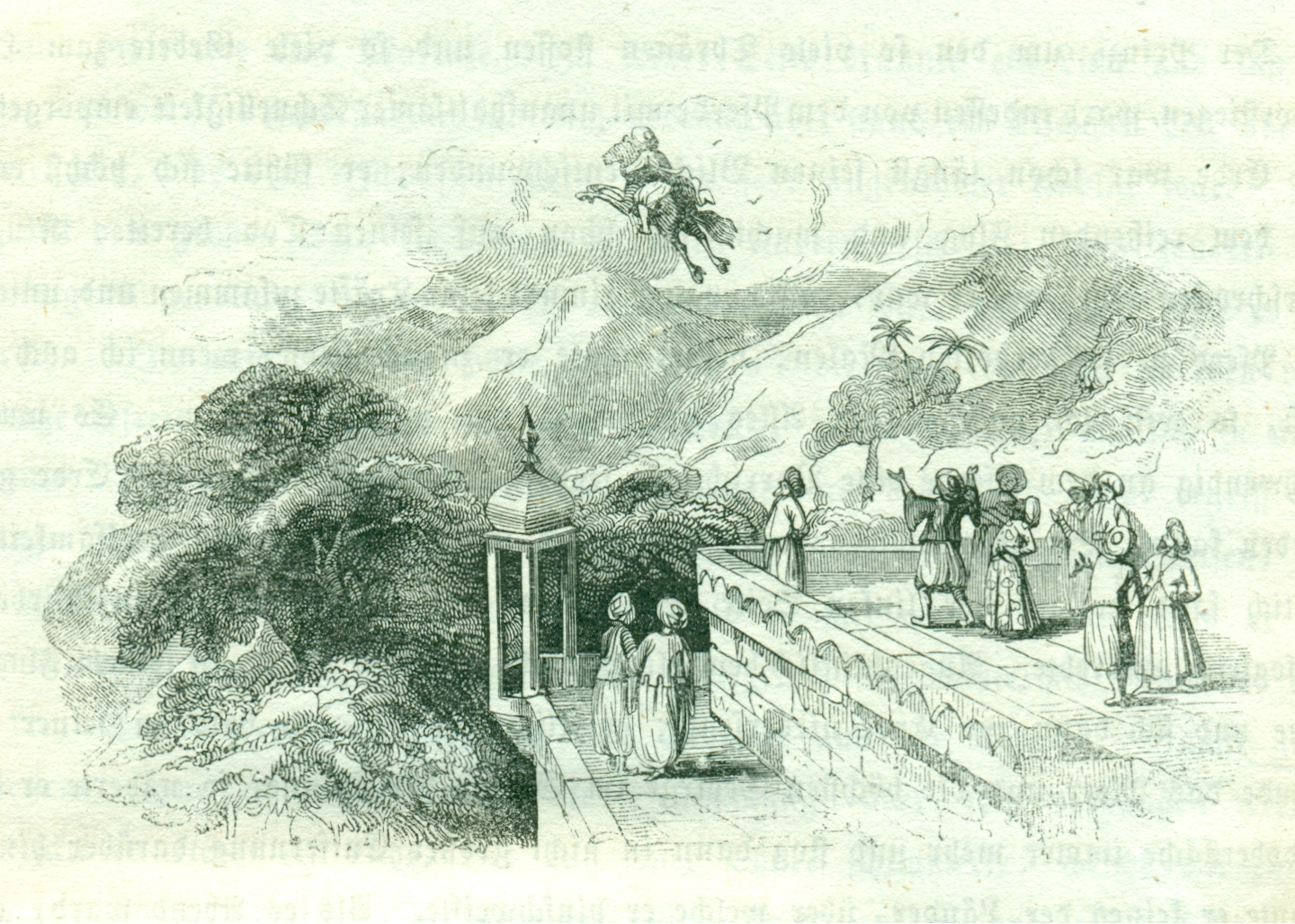
Friedrich Gross, ante 1830, woodcut

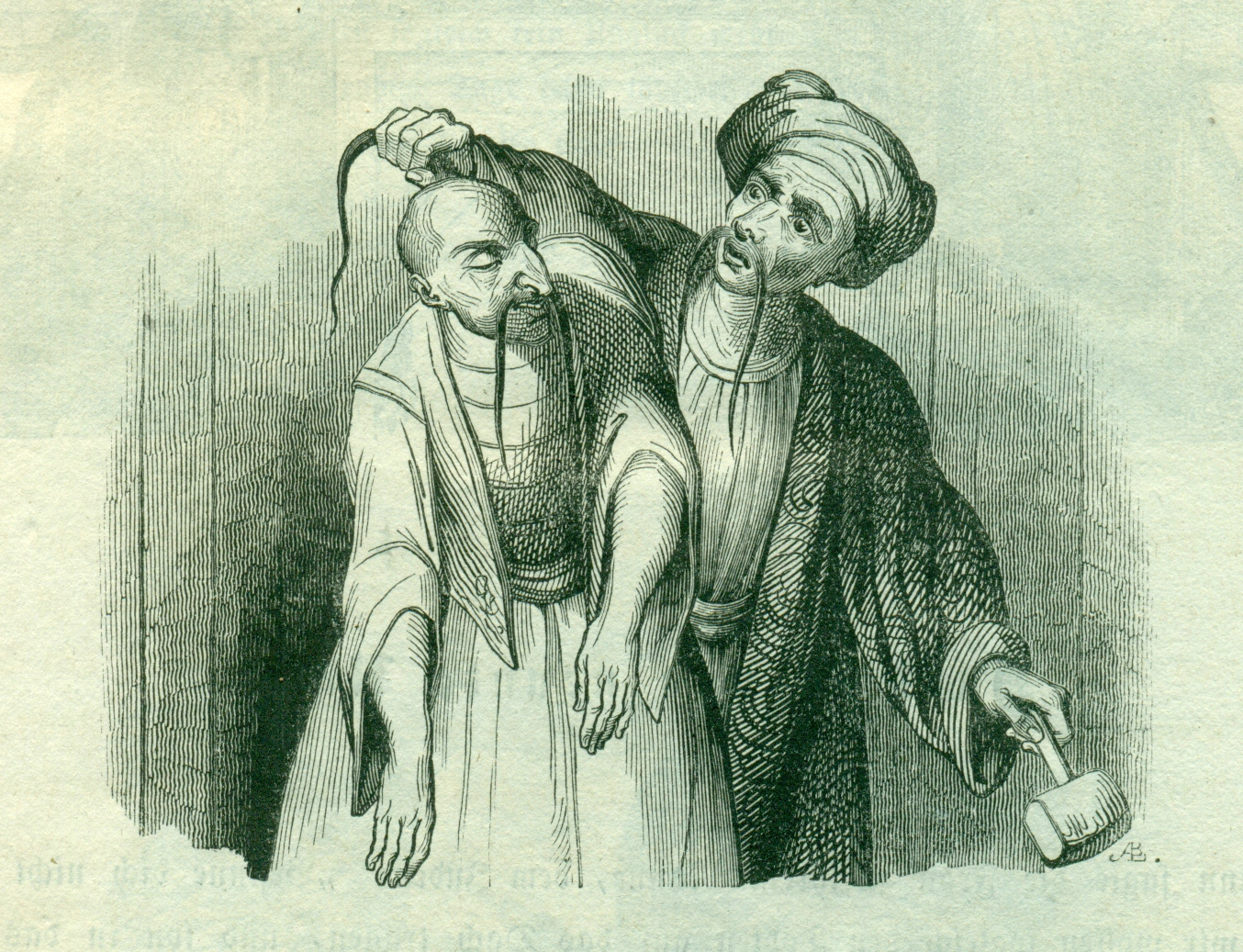
Friedrich Gross, ante 1830, woodcut

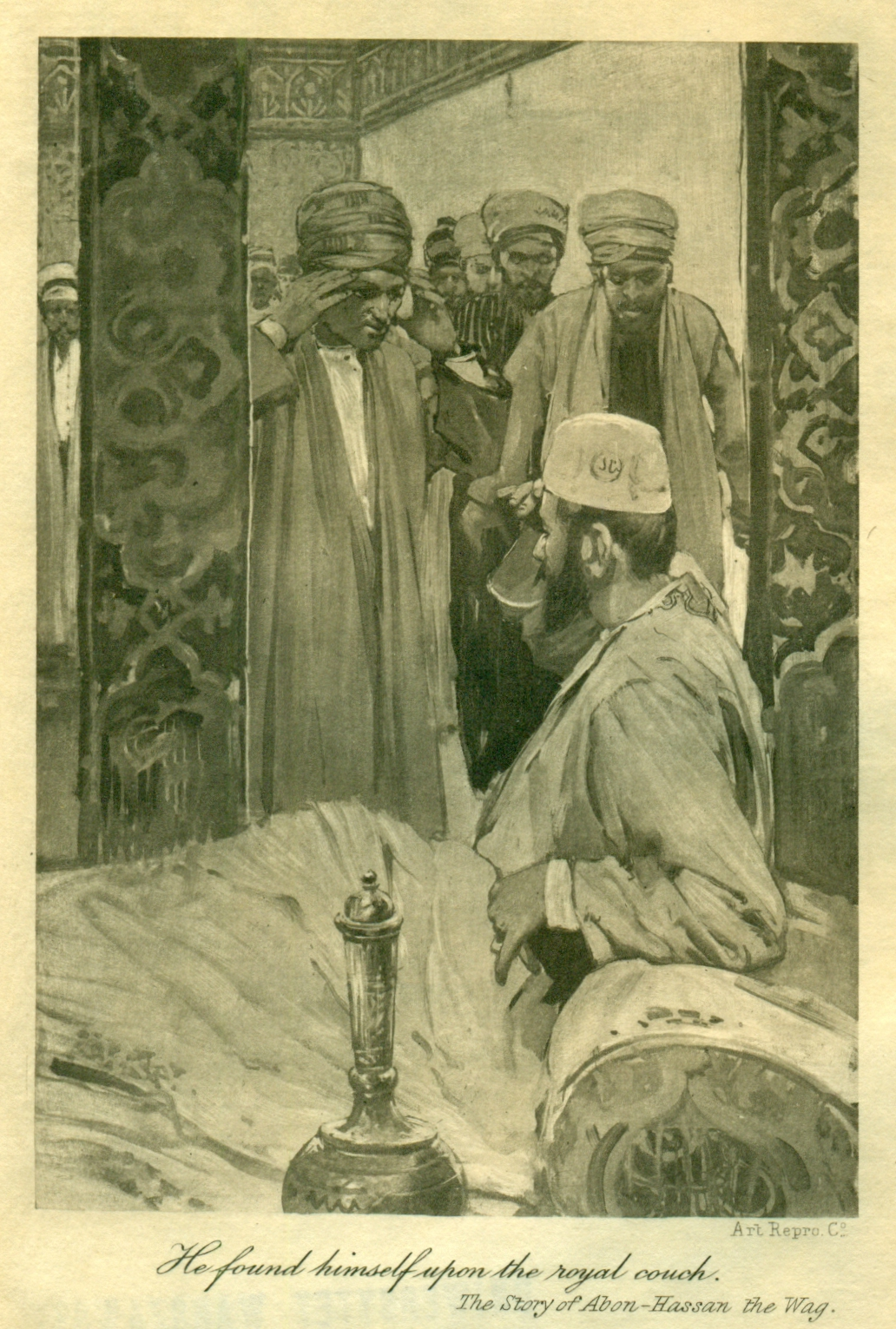
Frank Brangwyn, Story of Abon-Hassan the Wag ("He found himself upon the royal couch"), 1895–96, watercolour and tempera on millboard

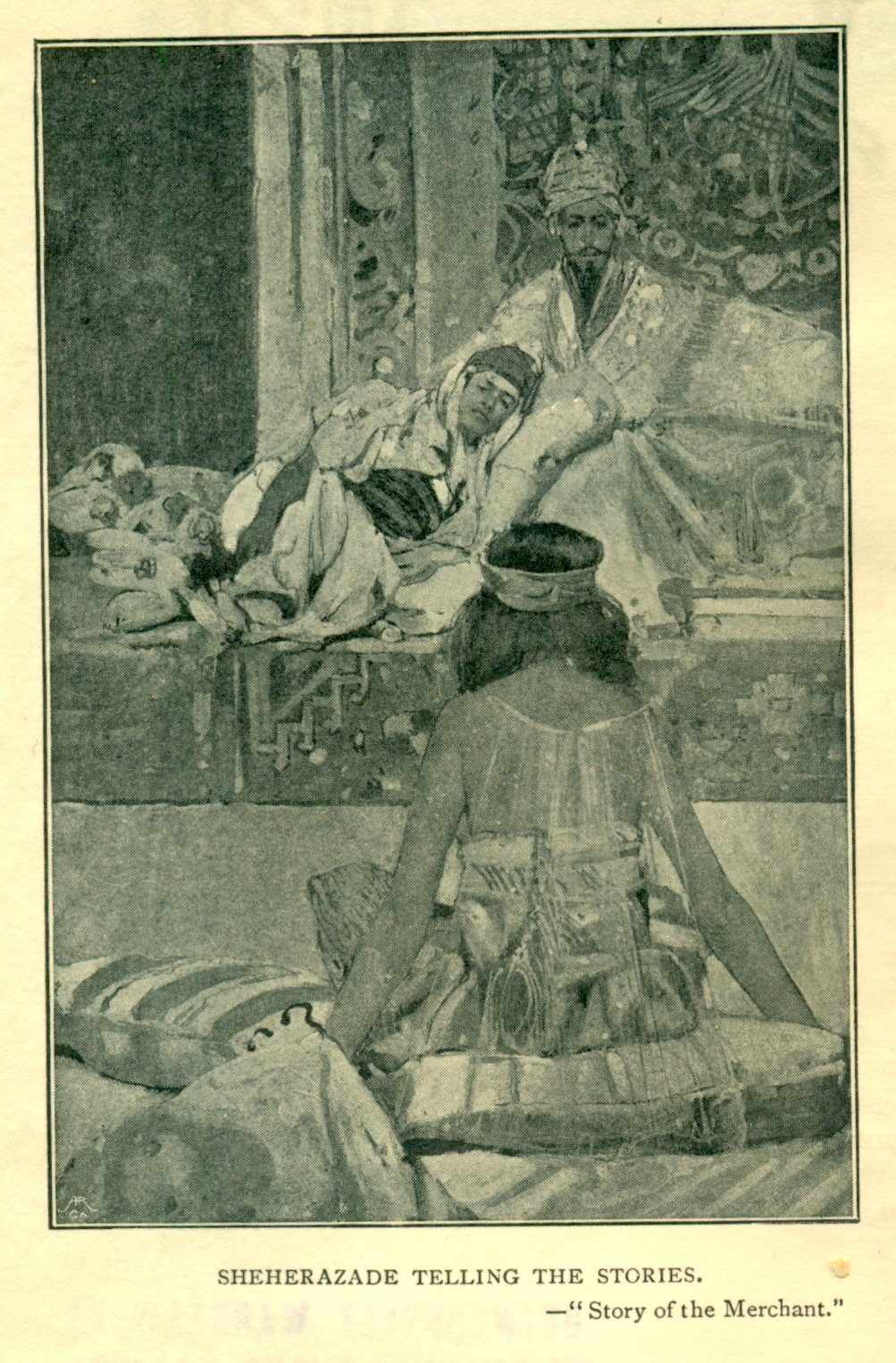
Frank Brangwyn, Story of the Merchant ("Sheherezade telling the stories"), 1895–96, watercolour and tempera on millboard

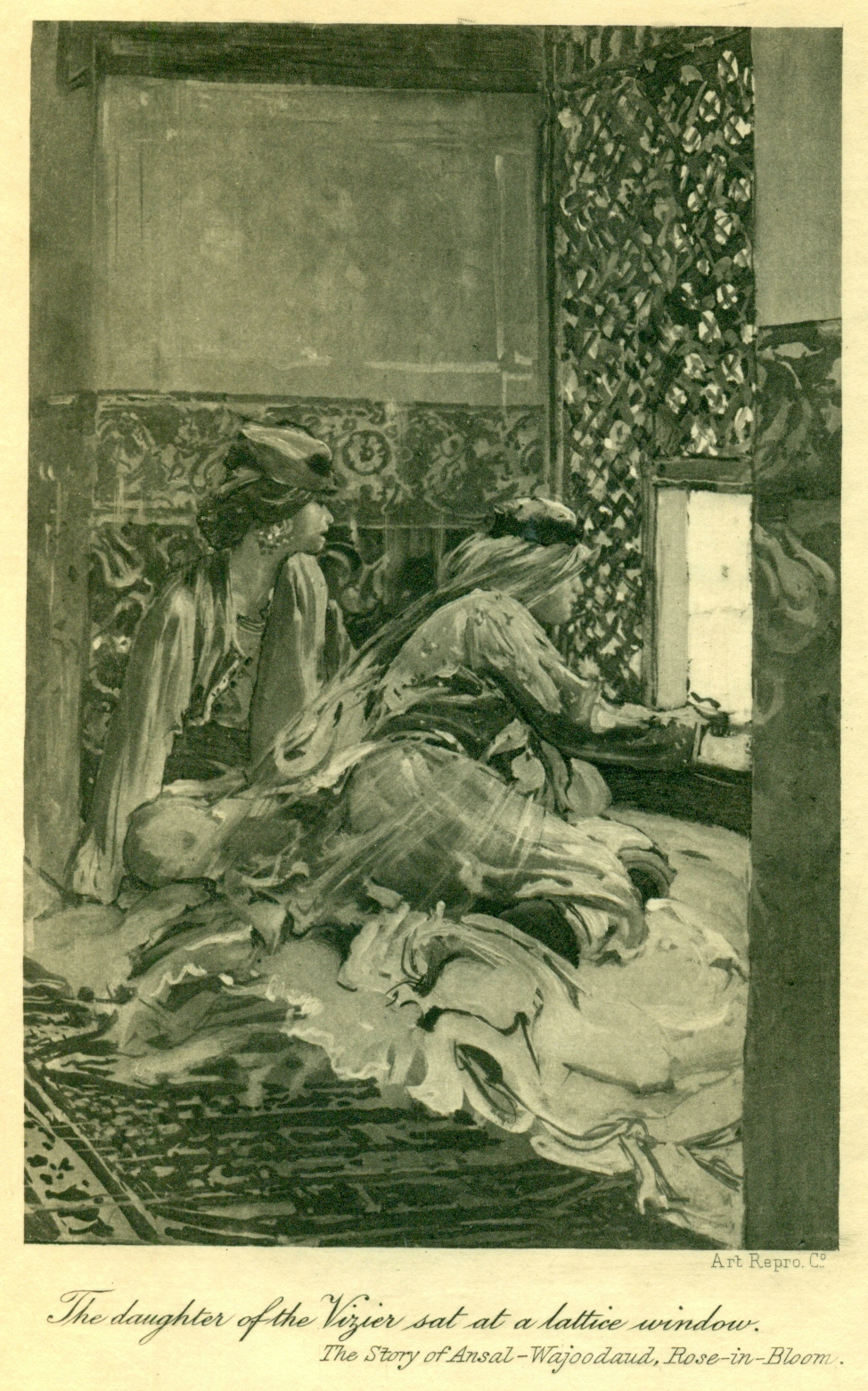
Frank Brangwyn, Story of Ansal-Wajooodaud, Rose-in-Bloom ("The daughter of a Visier sat at a lattice window"), 1895–96, watercolour and tempera on millboard

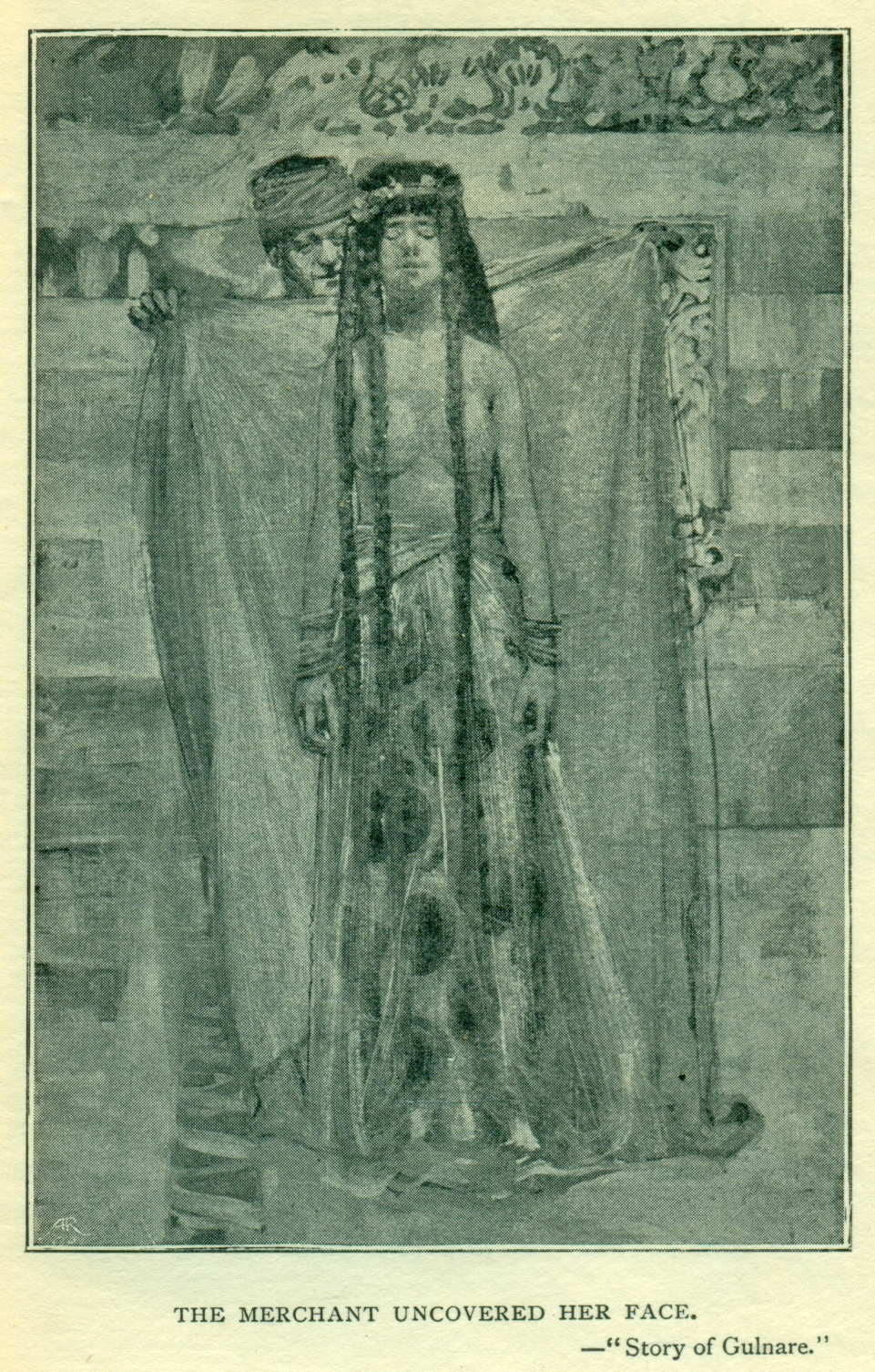
Frank Brangwyn, Story of Gulnare ("The merchant uncovered her face"), 1895–96, watercolour and tempera on millboard

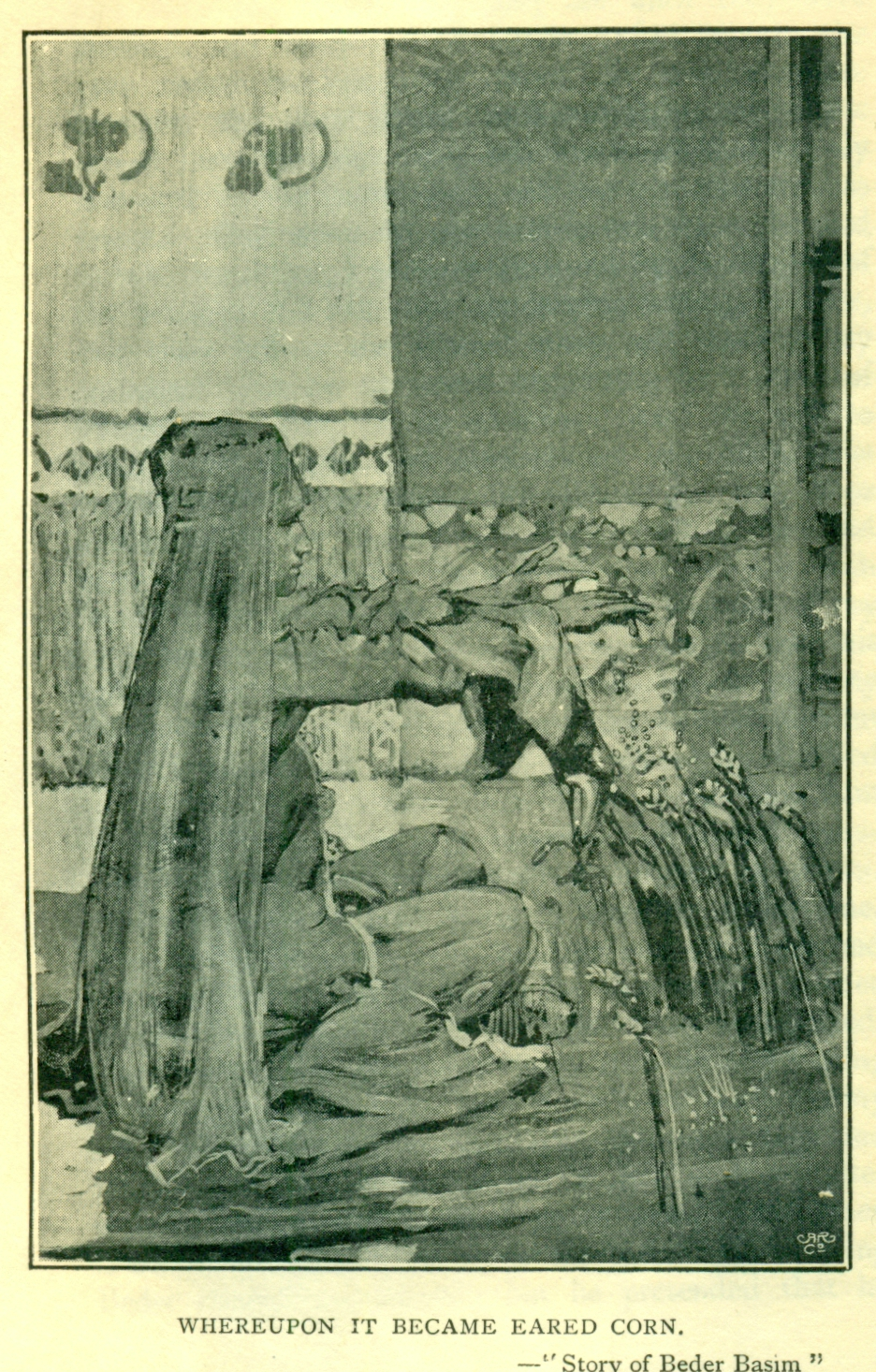
Frank Brangwyn, Story of Beder Basim ("Whereupon it became eared corn"), 1895–96, watercolour and tempera on millboard

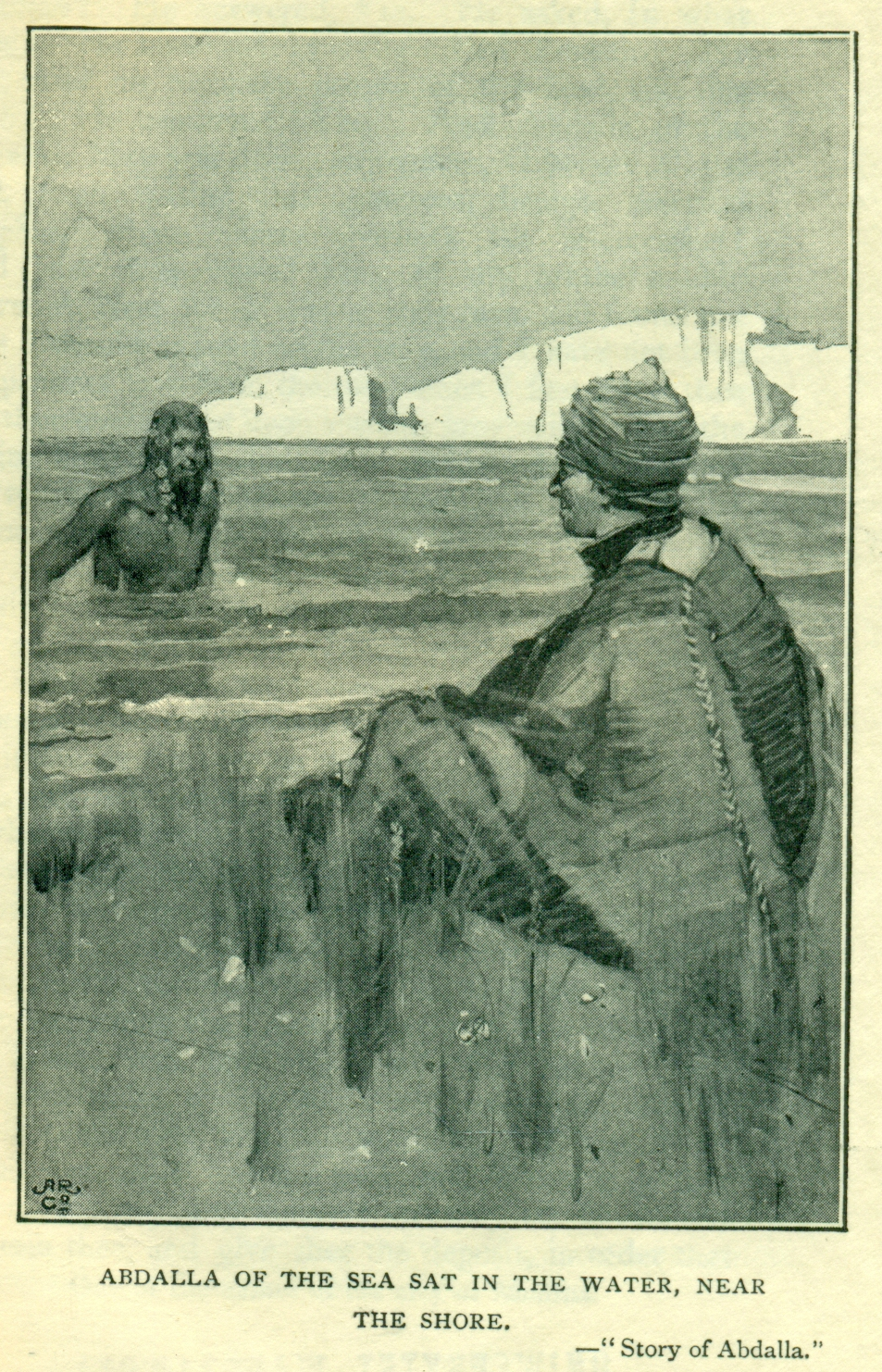
Frank Brangwyn, Story of Abdalla ("Abdalla of the sea sat in the water, near the shore"), 1895–96, watercolour and tempera on millboard

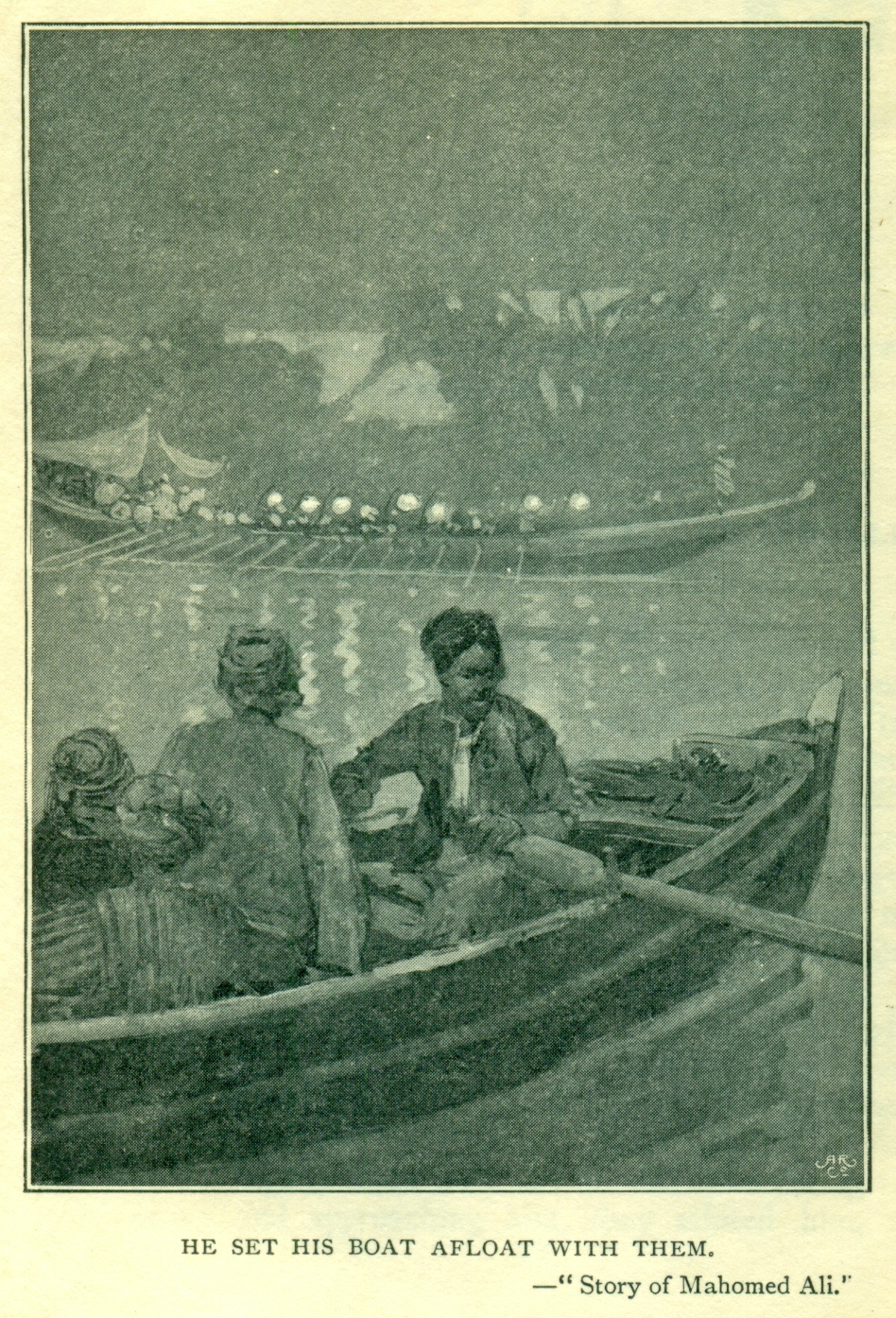
Frank Brangwyn, Story of Mahomed Ali ("He sat his boat afloat with them"), 1895–96, watercolour and tempera on millboard

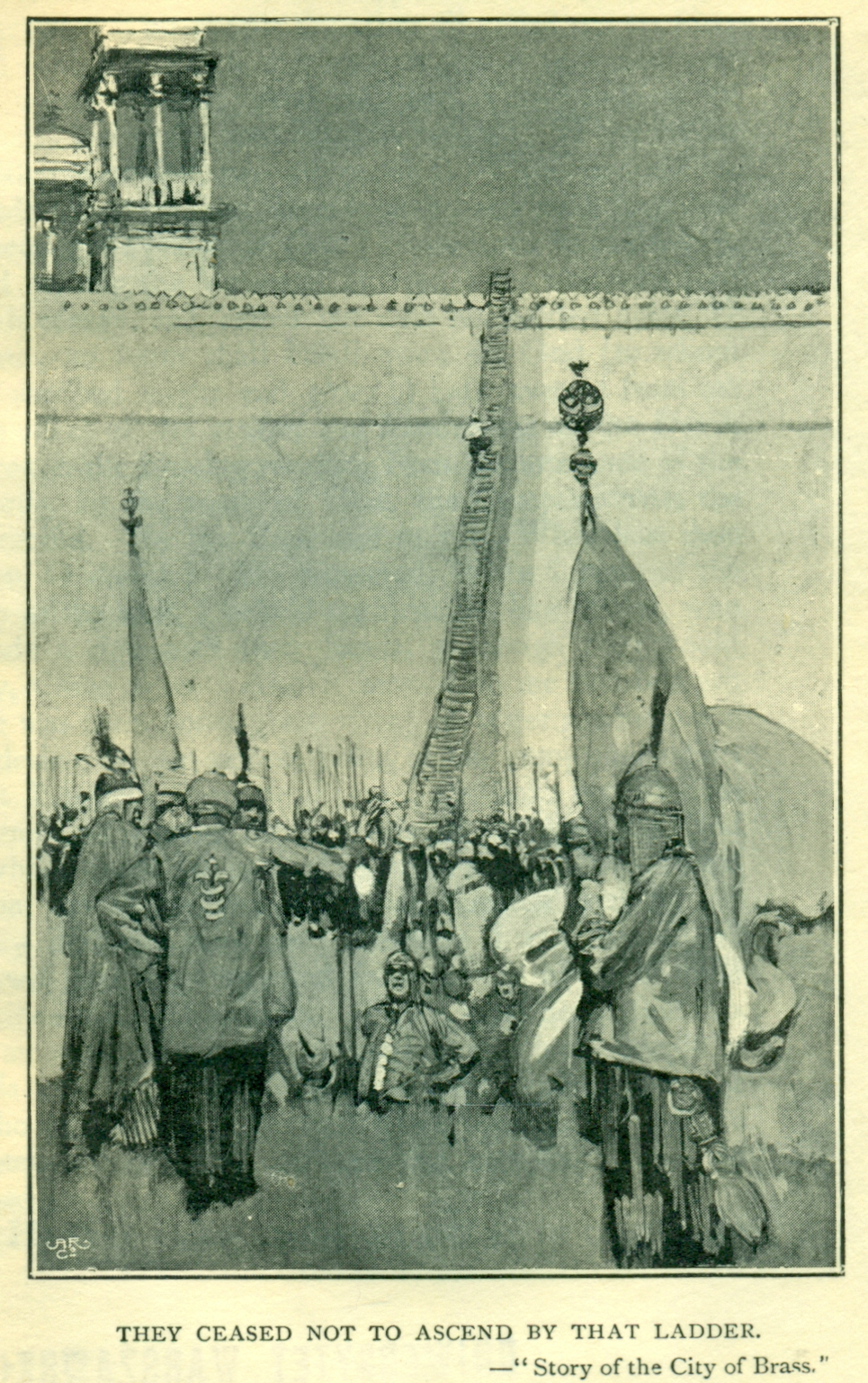
Frank Brangwyn, Story of the City of Brass ("They ceased not to ascend by that ladder"), 1895–96, watercolour and tempera on millboard

== See also ==
- Hamzanama
- List of One Thousand and One Nights characters
- List of stories from The Book of One Thousand and One Nights
- List of works influenced by One Thousand and One Nights
- Shahnameh
- One Hundred and One Nights (book) – a similar medieval tale collection using the same frame story as One Thousand and One Nights

== General and cited sources ==
- Irwin, Robert (2004). The Arabian Nights: A Companion (TPB ed.). London: I.B. Tauris. ISBN 1-86064-983-1. OCLC 693781081.
- Irwin, Robert (2010). The Arabian Nights: A Companion (EBook (PDF) ed.). London: I.B. Tauris. ISBN 978-0-85771-051-2. OCLC 843203755.
- Ulrich Marzolph (ed.). The Arabian Nights Reader (Wayne State University Press, 2006).
- Marzolph, Ulrich; van Leeuwen, Richard; Wassouf, Hassan (2004). The Arabian Nights Encyclopedia. ABC-CLIO. ISBN 1-57607-204-5.
- Chraïbi, Aboubakr (2016). Arabic Manuscripts of the Thousand and One Nights. HAL Open Science.
- Charles Pellat, "Alf Layla Wa Layla" in Encyclopædia Iranica. Online access June 2011.
- Pinault, David (1992). Story-Telling Techniques in the Arabian Nights. Brill Publishers. ISBN 90-04-09530-6.
- Dwight Reynolds, "A Thousand and One Nights: A History of the Text and Its Reception" in The Cambridge History of Arabic Literature Vol 6. (CUP 2006).
- Eva Sallis, Scheherazade Through the Looking-Glass: The Metamorphosis of the Thousand and One Nights (Routledge, 1999).
- Yamanaka, Yuriko and Nishio, Tetsuo (ed.). The Arabian Nights and Orientalism: Perspectives from East and West (I.B. Tauris, 2006). ISBN 1-85043-768-8.
