= List of stories within One Thousand and One Nights =

One Thousand and One Nights is a collection of folktales from the Middle East compiled in the Arabic language during the Islamic Golden Age. It is often known in English as The Arabian Nights. It consists of stories within a story; the frame story is "The Story of King Shahryar of Persia and His Brother" (or "The Story of King Shahryar and Queen Shahrazad"), in which Scheherazade tells tales to her husband Shahryar.

The stories listed here include those from the first ten volumes of Richard Francis Burton's translation (which he called The Book of the Thousand Nights and a Night), published in 1885, and his Supplemental Nights, published as six volumes between 1886 and 1888. Also included are stories found in other translations and manuscripts, following the list in the Arabian Nights Encyclopedia by Ulrich Marzolph. Both Sunni and Shi'ite stories are included.

Numbers in parentheses indicate the night that began during the tale indicated (or one of its sub-tales). Numbers in double parentheses indicate that the story is fully contained in the indicated night. An asterisk indicates that the story begins with the night.

== Richard Francis Burton's translation ==
=== Volume 1 ===
- Story of King Shahryar and His Brother (1–1001)
  - Tale of the Bull and the Ass (Told by the Vizier) (0)
  - Tale of the Trader and the Jinn (1–3)
    - The First Shaykh's Story (1-2)
    - The Second Shaykh's Story ((2))
    - The Third Shaykh's Story (2-3)
  - Tale of the Fisherman and the Jinni (3–9)
    - Tale of the Vizier and the Sage Duban (5)
      - Story of King Sindibad and His Falcon ((5))
      - Tale of the Husband and the Parrot ((5))
      - Tale of the Prince and the Ogress (5-7)
    - Tale of the Ensorcelled Prince (7-8)
  - The Porter and the Three Ladies of Baghdad (9–19)
    - The First Kalandar's Tale (11-12)
    - The Second Kalandar's Tale (12–14)
      - Tale of the Envier and the Envied ((14))
    - The Third Kalandar's Tale (14–17)
    - The Eldest Lady's Tale (17-18)
    - Tale of the Portress ((18))
  - The Tale of the Three Apples (19–24)
    - Tale of Núr al-Dín Alí and his Son (20–24)
  - The Hunchback's Tale (24–34)
    - The Nazarene Broker's Story (25-26)
    - The Reeve's Tale (27-28)
    - Tale of the Jewish Doctor (28-29)
    - Tale of the Tailor (29–33)
      - The Barber's Tale of Himself (31–33)
        - The Barber's Tale of his First Brother ((31))
        - The Barber's Tale of his Second Brother (31-32)
        - The Barber's Tale of his Third Brother ((32))
        - The Barber's Tale of his Fourth Brother ((32))
        - The Barber's Tale of his Fifth Brother (32-33)
        - The Barber's Tale of his Sixth Brother ((33))
        - The End of the Tailor's Tale (33-34)

=== Volume 2 ===
- Nur al-Din Ali and the Damsel Anis Al-Jalis (34–38)
- Tale of Ghanim bin Ayyub, The Distraught, The Thrall o' Love (39–45)
  - Tale of the First Eunuch, Bukhayt ((39))
  - Tale of the Second Eunuch, Kafur (40)
- The Tale of King Omar bin al-Nu'uman and His Sons Sharrkan and Zau al-Makan, and What Befell Them of Things Seld-Seen and Peregrine (46–124)
  - Tale of Tàj al-Mulúk and the Princess Dunyà: The Lover and the Loved (108–124)
    - Tale of Azíz and Azízah (113–124)

=== Volume 3 ===
- The Tale of King Omar Bin al-Nu'uman and His Sons Sharrkan and Zau al-Makan (continued) (125–145)
  - Tale of Tàj al-Mulúk and the Princess Dunyà: The Lover and the Loved (continued) (125–137)
    - Continuation of the Tale of Aziz and Azizah (125–128)
  - Tale of the Hashish Eater (143)
  - Tale of Hammad the Badawi ((144))
- The Birds and Beasts and the Carpenter (*146–147)
- The Hermits (148)
- The Water-Fowl and the Tortoise ((148))
- The Wolf and the Fox (149–150)
  - Tale of the Falcon and the Partridge ((149))
- The Mouse and the Ichneumon (151)
- The Cat and the Crow ((150))
- The Fox and the Crow ((150))
  - The Flea and the Mouse ((150))
  - The Saker and the Birds (152)
  - The Sparrow and the Eagle ((152))
- The Hedgehog and the Wood Pigeons ((152))
  - The Merchant and the Two Sharpers ((152))
- The Thief and His Monkey ((152))
  - The Foolish Weaver ((152))
- The Sparrow and the Peacock ((152))
- Tale of Ali bin Bakkar and Shams al-Nahar (*153–169)
- Tale of Kamar al-Zaman (*170–237)

=== Volume 4 ===
- Tale of Kamar al-Zaman (continued)
  - Ni'amah bin al-Rabi'a and Naomi His Slave-Girl (238–246)
- [Conclusion of the Tale of Kamar al-Zaman] (247–249)
- Ala al-Din Abu al-Shamat (250–269)
- Hatim of the Tribe of Tayy (270)
- Tale of Ma'an the Son of Zaidah (271)
- Ma'an the Son of Zaidah and the Badawi
- The City of Labtayt (272)
- The Caliph Hisham and the Arab Youth
- Ibrahim bin al-Mahdi and the Barber-Surgeon (273–275)
- The City of Many-Columned Iram and Abdullah Son of Abi Kilabah (276–279)
- Isaac of Mosul (280–282)
- The Sweep and the Noble Lady (283–285)
- The Mock Caliph (286–294)
- Ali the Persian (295–296)
- Harun al-Rashid and the Slave-Girl and the Imam Abu Yusuf (297)
- Tale of the Lover Who Feigned Himself a Thief (298–299)
- Ja'afar the Barmecide and the Bean-Seller ((299))
- Abu Mohammed hight Lazybones (300–305)
- Generous Dealing of Yahya bin Khalid The Barmecide with Mansur (306)
- Generous Dealing of Yahya Son of Khalid with a Man Who Forged a Letter in his Name (307)
- Caliph Al-Maamun and the Strange Scholar (308)
- Ali Shar and Zumurrud (309–327)
- The Loves of Jubayr bin Umayr and the Lady Budur (328–334)
- The Man of Al-Yaman and His Six Slave-Girls (335–338)
- Harun al-Rashid and the Damsel and Abu Nowas (339–340)
- The Man Who Stole the Dish of Gold Wherein The Dog Ate (341)
- The Sharper of Alexandria and the Chief of Police (342)
- Al-Malik al-Nasir and the Three Chiefs of Police (343-344)
  - The Story of the Chief of Police of Cairo ((343))
  - The Story of the Chief of the Bulak Police (344)
  - The Story of the Chief of the Old Cairo Police ((344))
- The Thief and the Shroff (345)
- The Chief of the Kus Police and the Sharper (346)
- Ibrahim bin al-Mahdi and the Merchant's Sister (347)
- The Woman whose Hands were Cut Off for Giving Alms to the Poor (348)
- The Devout Israelite (349)
- Abu Hassan al-Ziyadi and the Khorasan Man (350–351)
- The Poor Man and His Friend in Need ((351))
- The Ruined Man Who Became Rich Again Through a Dream (352)
- Caliph al-Mutawakkil and his Concubine Mahbubah (353)
- Wardan the Butcher; His Adventure With the Lady and the Bear (354–355)
- The King's Daughter and the Ape (356–357)

=== Volume 5 ===
- The Ebony Horse (358–371)
- Uns al-Wujud and the Vizier's Daughter al-Ward Fi'l-Akmam or Rose-In-Hood (372–381)
- Abu Nowas With the Three Boys and the Caliph Harun al-Rashid (382–383)
- Abdallah bin Ma'amar With the Man of Bassorah and His Slave Girl ((383))
- The Lovers of the Banu Ozrah (384)
- The Wazir of al-Yaman and His Younger Brother ((384))
- The Loves of the Boy and Girl at School (385)
- Al-Mutalammis and His Wife Umaymah ((385))
- The Caliph Harun al-Rashid and Queen Zubaydah in the Bath (386)
- Harun al-Rashid and the Three Poets ((386))
- Mus'ab bin al-Zubayr and Ayishah Daughter of Talhah (387)
- Abu al-Aswad and His Slave-Girl ((387))
- Harun al-Rashid and the Two Slave-Girls ((387))
- The Caliph Harun al-Rashid and the Three Slave-Girls ((387))
- The Miller and His Wife (388)
- The Simpleton and the Sharper ((388))
- The Kazi Abu Yusuf With Harun al-Rashid and Queen Zubaydah (389)
- The Caliph al-Hakim and the Merchant ((389))
- King Kisra Anushirwan and the Village Damsel (390)
- The Water-Carrier and the Goldsmith's Wife (391)
- Khusrau and Shirin and the Fisherman ((391))
- Yahya bin Khalid the Barmecide and the Poor Man (392)
- Mohammed al-Amin and the Slave-Girl ((392))
- The Sons of Yahya bin Khalid and Sa'id bin Salim al-Bahili (393)
- The Woman's Trick Against Her Husband (394)
- The Devout Woman and the Two Wicked Elders ((394))
- Ja'afar the Barmecide and the Old Badawi (395)
- The Caliph Omar bin al-Khattab and the Young Badawi (396–397)
- The Caliph al-Maamun and the Pyramids of Egypt (398)
- The Thief and the Merchant (399)
- Masrur the Eunuch and Ibn al-Karibi (400–401)
- The Devotee Prince (402)
- The Unwise Schoolmaster Who Fell in Love by Report (403)
- The Foolish Dominie ((403))
- The Illiterate Who Set Up For a Schoolmaster (404)
- The King and the Virtuous Wife ((404))
- Abd al-Rahman the Maghribi's Story of the Rukh (405)
- Adi bin Zayd and the Princess Hind (406–407)
- Di'ibil al-Khuza'i With the Lady and Muslim bin al-Walid ((407))
- Isaac of Mosul and the Merchant (408–409)
- The Three Unfortunate Lovers (410)
- How Abu Hasan Brake Wind (not found in other editions; authenticity disputed) ((410))
- The Lovers of the Banu Tayy (411)
- The Mad Lover (412)
- The Prior Who Became a Moslem (413–414)
- The Loves of Abu Isa and Kurrat al-Ayn (415–418)
- Al-Amin Son of al-Rashid and His Uncle Ibrahim bin al-Mahdi (419)
- Al-Fath bin Khakan and the Caliph Al-Mutawakkil ((419))
- The Man's Dispute With the Learned Woman Concerning the Relative Excellence of Male and Female (420–423)
- Abu Suwayd and the Pretty Old Woman (424)
- The Emir ali bin Tahir and the Girl Muunis ((424))
- The Woman Who had a Boy and the Other Who had a Man to Lover ((424))
- Ali the Cairene and the Haunted House in Baghdad (425–434)
- The Pilgrim Man and the Old Woman (435–436)
- Abu al-Husn and His Slave-Girl Tawaddud (437–462)
- The Angel of Death With the Proud King and the Devout Man
- The Angel of Death and the Rich King (463)
- The Angel of Death and the King of the Children of Israel (464)
- Iskandar Zu al-Karnayn and a Certain Tribe of Poor Folk
- The Righteousness of King Anushirwan (465)
- The Jewish Kazi and His Pious Wife (466)
- The Shipwrecked Woman and Her Child (467)
- The Pious Black Slave (468)
- The Devout Tray-Maker and His Wife (469–470)
- Al-Hajjaj and the Pious Man (471)
- The Blacksmith Who Could Handle Fire Without Hurt (472–473)
- The Devotee To Whom Allah Gave a Cloud for Service and the Devout King (474)
- The Moslem Champion and the Christian Damsel (475–477)
- The Christian King's Daughter and the Moslem (478)
- The Prophet and the Justice of Providence (479)
- The Ferryman of the Nile and the Hermit
- The Island King and the Pious Israelite (480–481)
- Abu al-Hasan and Abu Ja'afar the Leper (482)
- The Queen of Serpents (483–486)
  - The Adventures of Bulukiya (487–499)
  - The Story of Janshah (500–530)
  - [The Adventures of Bulukiya] resumed (531–533)
- [The Queen of Serpents] resumed (534–536)

=== Volume 6 ===
- Sindbad the Seaman and Sindbad the Landsman (537–538)
  - The First Voyage of Sindbad the Seaman (539–542)
  - The Second Voyage of Sindbad the Seaman (543–546)
  - The Third Voyage of Sindbad the Seaman (547–550)
  - The Fourth Voyage of Sindbad the Seaman (551–556)
  - The Fifth Voyage of Sindbad the Seaman (557–559)
  - The Sixth Voyage of Sindbad the Seaman (560–563)
  - The Seventh Voyage of Sindbad the Seaman (564–566)
  - [Burton adds an alternative seventh voyage before concluding the Sindbad head story]
- The City of Brass (567–578)
- The Craft and Malice of Woman, or the Tale of the King, His Son, His Concubine and the Seven Viziers
  - The King and His Vizier's Wife (579)
  - The Confectioner, His Wife and the Parrot
  - The Fuller and His Son (580)
  - The Rake's Trick Against the Chaste Wife
  - The Miser and the Loaves of Bread (581)
  - The Lady and Her Two Lovers
  - The King's Son and the Ogress (582)
  - The Drop of Honey
  - The Woman Who Made Her Husband Sift Dust
  - The Enchanted Spring (583–584)
  - The Vizier's Son and the Hammam-Keeper's Wife
  - The Wife's Device to Cheat her Husband (585–586)
  - The Goldsmith and the Cashmere Singing-Girl (587)
  - The Man who Never Laughed During the Rest of His Days (588–591)
  - The King's Son and the Merchant's Wife (592)
  - The Page Who Feigned to Know the Speech of Birds (593)
  - The Lady and Her Five Suitors (594–596)
  - The Three Wishes, or the Man Who Longed to see the Night of Power
  - The Stolen Necklace (597)
  - The Two Pigeons
  - Prince Behram and the Princess Al-Datma (598)
  - The House With the Belvedere (599–602)
  - The King's Son and the Ifrit's Mistress (603)
  - The Sandal-Wood Merchant and the Sharpers (604–605)
  - The Debauchee and the Three-Year-Old Child
  - The Stolen Purse (606)
  - The Fox and the Folk
- Judar and His Brethren (607–624)
- The History of Gharib and His Brother Ajib (625–636)

=== Volume 7 ===
- The History of Gharib and His Brother Ajib (continued) (637–680)
- Otbah and Rayya (681)
- Hind Daughter of Al-Nu'man, and Al-Hajjaj (682–683)
- Khuzaymah Bin Bishr and Ikrimah Al-Fayyaz (684)
- Yunus the Scribe and the Caliph Walid Bin Sahl (685)
- Harun al-Rashid and the Arab Girl (686)
- Al-Asma'i and the Three Girls of Bassorah (687)
- Ibrahim of Mosul and the Devil (688)
- The Lovers of the Banu Uzrah (689–691)
- The Badawi and His Wife (692–693)
- The Lovers of Bassorah (694–695)
- Ishak of Mosul and His Mistress and the Devil (696)
- The Lovers of Al-Medinah (697)
- Al-Malik Al-Nasir and His Wazir (698)
- The Rogueries of Dalilah the Crafty and Her Daughter Zaynab the Coney-Catcher (699–708)
  - The Adventures of Mercury Ali of Cairo (709–719)
- Ardashir and Hayat al-Nufus (720–738)
- Julnar the Sea-Born and Her Son King Badr Basim of Persia (739–756)
- King Mohammed Bin Sabaik and the Merchant Hasan (757–758)
  - Story of Prince Sayf al-Muluk and the Princess Badi'a al-Jamal (759–776)

=== Volume 8 ===
- King Mohammed Bin Sabaik and the Merchant Hasan (continued)
  - Story of Prince Sayf al-Muluk and the Princess Badi'a al-Jamal (continued) (777–778)
- Hassan of Bassorah (779–831)
- Khalifah The Fisherman Of Baghdad (832–845)
- [Alternate version of the same story from the Breslau edition]
- Masrur and Zayn al-Mawasif (846–863)
- Ali Nur al-Din and Miriam the Girdle-Girl (864–888)

=== Volume 9 ===
- Ali Nur al-Din and Miriam the Girdle-Girl (continued) (889–894)
- The Man of Upper Egypt and His Frankish Wife (895–896)
- The Ruined Man of Baghdad and his Slave-Girl (897–899)
- King Jali'ad of Hind and His Wazir Shimas (900)
- The History of King Wird Khan, son of King Jali'ad with His Women and Viziers
  - The Mouse and the Cat (901–902)
  - The Fakir and His Jar of Butter (903)
  - The Fishes and the Crab
  - The Crow and the Serpent (904)
  - The Wild Ass and the Jackal (905)
  - The Unjust King and the Pilgrim Prince (906)
  - The Crows and the Hawk (907)
  - The Serpent-Charmer and His Wife (908)
  - The Spider and the Wind (909)
  - The Two Kings (910)
  - The Blind Man and the Cripple (911–918)
  - The Foolish Fisherman
  - The Boy and the Thieves (919)
  - The Man and his Wife (920)
  - The Merchant and the Robbers (921)
  - The Jackals and the Wolf
  - The Shepherd and the Rogue (922–924)
  - The Francolin and the Tortoises
- [The History of King Wird Khan, son of King Jali'ad with His Women and Viziers] resumed (925–930)
- Abu Kir the Dyer and Abu Sir the Barber (931–940)
- Abdullah the Fisherman and Abdullah the Merman (941–946)
- Harun Al-Rashid and Abu Hasan, The Merchant of Oman (947–952)
- Ibrahim and Jamilah (953–959)
- Abu Al-Hasan of Khorasan (960–963)
- Kamar Al-Zaman and the Jeweller's Wife (964–978)
- Abdullah bin Fazil and His Brothers (979–989)

=== Volume 10 ===
- Ma'aruf the Cobbler and His Wife Fatimah (990–1001)
- Conclusion of Shahrazad and Shahryar

Also included in this volume

- Terminal Essay
- Preliminary
- I. The Origin of The Nights
  - A. The Birthplace
  - B. The Date
  - C. [Authors]
- II. The Nights in Europe
- III. The Matter and the Manner of The Nights
  - A. The Matter
  - B. The Manner of The Nights
- IV. Social Condition
  - A. Al-Islam
  - B. Woman
  - C. Pornography
  - D. Pederasty
- V. On the Prose-Rhyme and the Poetry of The Nights
  - A. The Saj'a
  - B. The Verse
- L'Envoi
- Index (for both the remaining tales in this volume and the terminal essay)
- Appendices
- Memorandum
- Appendix I
  - Index I: Index to the Tales and Proper Names
  - Index II: Alphabetical Table of the Notes (Anthropological, &c.)
  - Index IIIA: Alphabetical Table of First Lines (Metrical Portion) in English
  - Index IIIB: Alphabetical Table of First Lines (Metrical Portion) in Arabic
  - Index IVA: Table of Contents of the Unfinished Calcutta Edition
  - Index IVB: Table of Contents of the Breslau (Tunis) Edition
  - Index IVC: Table of Contents of the MacNaghten or Turner-Macan Text and Bulak Edition
  - Index IVD: Comparison of the Tables of Contents of the Lane and Burton versions
- Appendix II: Contributions to the Bibliography (by W. F. Kirby)
  - Galland's MS and Translation
  - Cazotte's Continuation, and the Composite Editions
  - The Commencement of the Story of Saif Zul Yezn According to Habicht
  - Scott's MSS and Translations
  - Weil's Translation
  - Von Hammer's MS and the Translations Derived from it
  - Collections of Selected Tales
  - Separate Editions of Single or Composite Tales
  - Translations of Cognate Oriental Romances
  - Dr. Clarke's MS.
  - Imitations and Miscellaneous Works
  - Conclusion
  - Comparative Table of the Tales in the Principal Editions

=== Supplemental Nights, Volume 1 ===
The material in the first two of the six supplemental volumes are the Arabic tales originally included in the John Payne translation. They are taken from the Breslau and Calcutta I edition.

- The Sleeper and the Waker
  - Story of the Larrikin and the Cook
- The Caliph Omar Bin Abd al-Aziz and the Poets
- Al-Hajjaj and the Three Young Men
- Harun al-Rashid and the Woman of the Barmecides
- The Ten Wazirs; or the History of King Azadbakht and His Son:
  Breslau edition (435–487)
  - Of the Uselessness of Endeavour Against Persistent Ill Fortune
  - Story of the Merchant Who Lost His Luck
  - Of Looking To the Ends of Affairs
  - Tale of the Merchant and His Sons
  - Of the Advantages of Patience
  - Story of Abu Sabir
  - Of the Ill Effects of Impatience
  - Story of Prince Bihzad
  - Of the Issues of Good and Evil Actions
  - Story of King Dadbin and His Wazirs
  - Of Trust in Allah
  - Story of King Bakhtzaman
  - Of Clemency
  - Story of King Bihkard
  - Of Envy and Malice
  - Story of Aylan Shah and Abu Tammam
  - Of Destiny or That Which Is Written On the Forehead
  - Story of King Ibrahim and His Son
  - Of the Appointed Term, Which, if it be Advanced, May Not Be Deferred, and if it be Deferred, May Not Be Advanced
  - Story of King Sulayman Shah and His Niece
  - Of the Speedy Relief of Allah
  - Story of the Prisoner and How Allah Gave Him Relief
- Ja'afar Bin Yahya and Abd al-Malik bin Salih the Abbaside
- Al-Rashid and the Barmecides
  Breslau (567)
- Ibn al-Sammak and al-Rashid
- Al-Maamum and Zubaydah
- Al-Nu'uman and the Arab of the Banu Tay
  Breslau (660–661)
- Firuz and His Wife
  Breslau (675–676)
- King Shah Bakht and his Wazir Al-Rahwan
  Breslau (875–930);
  - Tale of the Man of Khorasan, His Son and His Tutor
  - Tale of the Singer and the Druggist
  - Tale of the King Who Kenned the Quintessence of Things
  - Tale of the Richard Who Married His Beautiful Daughter to the Poor Old Man
  - Tale of the Sage and His Three Sons
  - Tale of the Prince who Fell in Love With the Picture
  - Tale of the Fuller and His Wife and the Trooper
  - Tale of the Merchant, The Crone, and the King
  - Tale of the Simpleton Husband
  - Tale of the Unjust King and the Tither
  - Story of David and Solomon
  - Tale of the Robber and the Woman
  - Tale of the Three Men and Our Lord Isa
  - The Disciple's Story
  - Tale of the Dethroned Ruler Whose Reign and Wealth Were Restored to Him
  - Talk of the Man Whose Caution Slew Him
  - Tale of the Man Who Was Lavish of His House and His Provision to One Whom He Knew Not
  - Tale of the Melancholist and the Sharper
  - Tale of Khalbas and his Wife and the Learned Man
  - Tale of the Devotee Accused of Lewdness
  - Tale of the Hireling and the Girl
  - Tale of the Weaver Who Became a Leach by Order of His Wife
  - Tale of the Two Sharpers Who Each Cozened His Compeer
  - Tale of the Sharpers With the Shroff and the Ass
  - Tale of the Chear and the Merchants
  - Story of the Falcon and the Locust
  - Tale of the King and His Chamberlain's Wife
  - Story of the Crone and the Draper's Wife
  - Tale of the Ugly Man and His Beautiful Wife
  - Tale of the King Who Lost Kingdom and Wife and Wealth and Allah Restored Them to Him
  - Tale of Salim the Youth of Khorasan and Salma, His Sister
  - Tale of the King of Hind and His Wazir
- Shahrazad and Shahryar, [an extract from the Breslau edition].

=== Supplemental Nights, Volume 2 ===
Continues the tales from Breslau and Calcutta I.

- Al-Malik al-Zahir Rukn al-Din Bibars al-Bundukdari and the Sixteen Captains of Police
  Breslau (930–940)
  - First Constable's History
  - Second Constable's History
  - Third Constable's History
  - Fourth Constable's History
  - Fifth Constable's History
  - Sixth Constable's History
  - Seventh Constable's History
  - Eighth Constable's History
  - The Thief's Tale
  - Ninth Constable's History
  - Tenth Constable's History
  - Eleventh Constable's History
  - Twelfth Constable's History
  - Thirteenth Constable's History
  - Fourteenth Constable's History
  - A Merry Jest of a Clever Thief
  - Tale of the Old Sharper
  - Fifteenth Constable's History
  - Sixteenth Constable's History
- Tale of Harun al-Rashid and Abdullah bin Nafi'
  Breslau (941–957)
  - Tale of the Damsel Torfat al-Kulub and the Caliph Harun al-Rashid
- Women's Wiles
  Calcutta I edition (196–200)
- Nur al-Din Ali of Damascus and the Damsel Sitt al-Milah
  Breslau (958–965)
- Tale of King Ins bin Kays and His Daughter with the Son of King Al-'Abbas
  Breslau (966–979)
- Alternate ending from the Breslau edition of tale of Shahrazad and Shahryar, with the remaining tales being told after night 1001
- Tale of the Two kings and the Wazir's Daughters
- The Concubine and the Caliph
- The Concubine of Al-Maamun

In the remainder of this volume W. A. Clouston presents "variants and analogues" of the supplemental nights.

- The Sleeper and the Waker
- The Ten Wazirs; or the History of King Azadbakht and His Son
- King Dadbin and His Wazirs
- King Aylan Shah and Abu Tamman
- King Sulayman Shah and His Niece
- Firuz and His Wife
- King Shah Bakht and His Wazir Al-Rahwan
- On the Art of Enlarging Pearls
- The Singer and the Druggist
  - Persian version
  - Ser Giovanni's version
  - Straparola's version
- The King Who Kenned the Quintessence of Things
  - Indian version
  - Siberian version
  - Hungarian version
  - Turkish analogue
- The Prince Who Fell In Love With the Picture
- The Fuller, His Wife, and the Trooper
- The Simpleton Husband
- The Three Men and our Lord Isa
- The Melancholist and the Sharper
- The Devout Woman accused of Lewdness
- The Weaver Who Became A Leach By Order of His Wife
- The King Who Lost Kingdom, Wife, and Wealth
  - Kashmiri version
  - Panjàbí version
  - Tibetan version
  - Legend of St. Eustache
  - Old English "Gesta" version
  - Romance of Sir Isumbras
- Al-Malik al-Zahir and the Sixteen Captains of Police
- The Thief's Tale
- The Ninth Constable's Story
- The Fifteenth Constable's Story
- The Damsel Tuhfat al-Kulub
- Women's Wiles
- Nur al-Din and the Damsel Sitt al-Milah
- King Ins Bin Kays and his Daughter
- Additional Notes
  - Firuz and His Wife
  - The Singer and the Druggist
  - The Fuller, His Wife, and the Trooper

=== Supplemental Nights, Volume 3 ===
This volume is based primarily on tales from Antoine Galland (The Hanna Diyab tales). Burton wanted to avoid the "French taste" of the tales, so he used oriental translations from Gallant text and translated those to the English. For Aladdin he used the Sabbagh manuscript:Bibliothèque nationale manuscript (Supplement Arab. No.2523), lent to him by Zotenberg. The nights indicated overlap with those given in Burton's main series.

- Foreword
- The Tale of Zayn al-Asnam (497–513)
  - Turkish version
- Alāʼ ad-Dīn and The Wonderful Lamp (514–591)
  - English translation of Galland
- Khudadad and His Brothers (592–595)
  - History of the Princess of Daryabar (596–599)
- [Khudadad and His Brothers] resumed (600–604)
- The Caliph's Night Adventure (605–606)
  - The Story of the Blind Man, Baba Abdullah (607–611)
  - History of Sidi Nu'uman (612–615)
  - History of Khwajah Hasan al-Habbal (616–625)
- Ali Baba and the Forty Thieves (626–638)
- Ali Khwajah and the Merchant of Baghdad (639–643)
- Prince Ahmad and the Fairy Peri-Banu (644–667)
- The Two Sisters Who Envied Their Cadette (668–688)

Appendix

- Variants and Analogues of the Tales in the Supplemental Nights, by W. A. Clouston
- The Tale of Zayn al-Asnam
- Aladdin; or, The Wonderful Lamp
- Khudadad and his Brothers
- The Story of the Blind Man, Baba Abdullah
- History of Sidi Nu'uman
- History of Khwajah Hasan al-Habbal
- Ali Baba and the Forty Thieves
- Ali Khwajah and the Merchant of Baghdad
- Prince Ahmad and the Peri-Banu
- The Two Sisters Who Envied Their Cadette
  - Modern Arabic version
  - Kaba'il version
  - Modern Greek version
  - Albanian version
  - Italian version
  - Breton version
  - German version
  - Icelandic version
  - Bengalí version
  - Buddhist version
- Additional notes
- The Tale of Zayn al-Asnam
- Aladdin; or, The Wonderful Lamp
- Ali Baba and the Forty Thieves
- The Tale of Prince Ahmad

=== Supplemental Nights, Volume 4 ===
The stories in this volume are based on the Wortley Montague Codex in the Bodleian Library, originally used for the Jonathan Scott translation. No explanation has been found regarding the nights that do not appear.

- Translator's Foreword
- Story of the Sultan of Al-Yaman and His Three Sons (330–334)
- Story of the Three Sharpers (335–342)
  - The Sultan Who Fared Forth in the Habit of a Darwaysh (343)
  - History of Mohammed, Sultan of Cairo (344–348)
  - Story of the First Lunatic (349–354)
  - Story of the Second Lunatic (355–357)
  - Story of the Sage and the Scholar (358–361)
  - The Night-Adventure of Sultan Mohammed of Cairo with the Three Foolish Schoolmasters (362)
  - Story of the Broke-Back Schoolmaster (363)
  - Story of the Split-Mouthed Schoolmaster (364)
  - Story of the Limping Schoolmaster (365)
  - [The Night-Adventure of Sultan Mohammed of Cairo] resumed (366)
  - Story of the Three Sisters and Their Mother the Sultanah (367–385)
- History of the Kazi Who Bare a Babe (387–392)
- Tale of the Kazi and the Bhang-Eater (393–397)
  - History of the Bhang-Eater and His Wife (398–400)
  - How Drummer Abu Kasim Became a Kazi (401)
  - Story of the Kazi and His Slipper (402–403)
- [Tale of the Kazi and the Bhang-Eater] resumed (404–412)
  - Tale of Mahmud the Persian and the Kurd Sharper (417)
  - Tale of the Sultan and His Sons and the Enchanting Bird (418–425)
  - Story of the King of Al-Yaman and His Three Sons and the Enchanting Bird (427, 429, 430, 432, 433, 435, 437, 438) (sic!)
  - History of the First Larrikin (441–443)
  - History of the Second Larrikin (445)
  - History of the Third Larrikin (447)
  - Story of a Sultan of Al-Hind and His Son Mohammed (449, 452, 455, 457, 459)
  - Tale of the Fisherman and His Son (461, 463, 465, 467, 469)
  - Tale of the Third Larrikin Concerning Himself (471)
- History of Abu Niyyah and Abu Niyyatayn (473, 475, 477, 479, 480)
- Appendices
- A: Ineptiæ Bodleianæ
- B: The Three Untranslated Tales in Mr. E. J. W. Gibb's "Forty Vezirs"
  - The Thirty-eighth Vezir's Story
  - The Fortieth Vezir's story
  - The Lady's Thirty-fourth Story

=== Supplemental Nights, Volume 5 ===
This volume continues material from the Wortley Montague Codex

- Translator's Foreword
- The History of the King's Son of Sind and the Lady Fatimah (495, 497, 499)
- History of the Lovers of Syria (503, 505, 507, 509)
- History of Al-Hajjaj Bin Yusuf and the Young Sayyid (512, 514, 516, 518)
- Night Adventure of Harun al-Rashid and the Youth Manjab
  - The Loves of the Lovers of Bassorah (in volume 7 of The Nights)
- [Night Adventure of Harun al-Rashid and the Youth Manjab] resumed (634, 636, 638, 640, 642, 643, 645, 646, 648, 649, 651)
  - Story of the Darwaysh and the Barber's Boy and the Greedy Sultan (653, 655)
  - Tale of the Simpleton Husband (656)
  - Note Concerning the "Tirrea Bede" (655)
  - The Loves of Al-Hayfa and Yusuf (663, 665, 667, 670, 672, 674, 676, 678, 680, 682, 684, 686, 687, 689, 691, 693, 694, 696, 698, 700, 702, 703, 705, 707, 709)
- The Three Princes of China (711, 712, 714, 716)
- The Righteous Wazir Wrongfully Gaoled (729, 731, 733)
- The Cairene Youth, the Barber and the Captain (735, 737)
- The Goodwife of Cairo and Her Four Gallants (739, 741)
  - The Tailor and the Lady and the Captain (743, 745)
  - The Syrian and the Three Women of Cairo (747)
  - The Lady With Two Coyntes (751)
  - The Whorish Wife Who Vaunted Her Virtue (754, 755)
- Cœlebs the Droll and His Wife and Her Four Lovers (758, 760)
- The Gatekeeper of Cairo and the Cunning She-Thief (761, 763, 765)
- Tale of Mohsin and Musa (767, 769, 771)
- Mohammed the Shalabi and His Mistress and His Wife (774, 776, 777)
- The Fellah and His Wicked Wife (778–779)
- The Woman Who Humoured Her Lover At Her Husband's Expense (781)
- The Kazi Schooled By His Wife (783, 785)
- The Merchant's Daughter and the Prince of Al-Irak (787, 790, 793, 795, 797, 799, 801, 803, 805, 807, 808, 810, 812, 814, 817, 819, 821, 823)
- Story of the Youth Who Would Futter His Father's Wives (832–836)
- Story of the Two Lack-Tacts of Cairo and Damascus (837–840)
- Tale of Himself Told By the King (912–917)
- Appendix I - Catalogue of Wortley Montague Manuscript Contents
- Appendix II
- Notes on the Stories Contained in Vol IV of "Supplemental Nights", by W. F. Kirby
- Notes on the Stories Contained in Vol V of "Supplemental Nights", by W. F. Kirby

=== Supplemental Nights, Volume 6 ===
Stories from a manuscript in the possession of the Syrian scholar Dom Chavis, which was the source of the tales of the Continuation (1788-89) published by Chavis and Cazotte.

- The Say of Haykar the Sage
- The History of Al-Bundukani or, the Caliph Harun Al-Rashid and the Daughter of King Kisra
- The Linguist-Dame, The Duenna and the King's Son
- The Tale of the Warlock and the Young Cook of Baghdad
- The Pleasant History of the Cock and the Fox
- History of What Befel the Fowl-let with the Fowler
- The Tale of Attaf
- History of Prince Habib and What Befel Him With the Lady Durrat Al-Ghawwas
  - The History of Durrat Al-Ghawwas

== Noted in Arabian Nights Encyclopedia ==
=== Habicht ===
Tales from the German translation of Max Habicht (1825), not present in Burton. All of them derived from the Extended French Edition of Gautier d'Arc (1822).

- The Forty Viziers
  - Shaykh Shahâb al-Dîn
  - The Gardener, His Son, and the Donkey
  - Sultan Mahmûd and His Vizier
  - The Brahmin Padmanaba and the Seller of Fuqqâ‘
  - The Thief Discovered by Story-telling
  - The Prince of Khwârazm and the Princess of Georgia
  - The Shoe-maker and His Lover
  - The Youth Behind Whom Indian and Chinese Airs Were Played
  - The King Who Transferred His Soul into a Parrot
- The King of Abyssinia
- The Sultan and His Storyteller
- Princess Ameny
  - The Woman Who Regained HerLoss
- ‘Alî Jawharî
- The King of Kochinchin’s Children
- The Woman Who Had Two Husbands
  - The Unjust Banker
  - The Adulteress Who Tested Her Husband’s Trust
- Yûsuf and the Indian Merchant
- Prince Benasir
- Sultan Salîm of Egypt
  - Shoemaker’s Wife
  - ‘Adîla
  - The Qalandar with the Scarred Forehead

=== Weil ===
Tales from the German translation of Gustav Weil (1837-1841), not present in Burton:

- ‘Alî and Zâhir from Damascus
- Solomon and the Queen of Sheba
- Tamîm al-Dârî
- Jûdar and the Moor Mahmûd
- The Adventures of Sultan Baybars
- ‘Alî the Fisherman
- Satilatlas and Hamama Telliwa

=== Mardrus ===
Tales from the French translation/adaptation of J. C. Mardrus (1898-1903. 2nd edition 1926-1932), later than Burton:

- The Parable of True Learning
- The Keys of Destiny
- The Diwan of easy jests and laughing wisdom
  - Buhlûl
  - The Qâdî-mule
  - The Qâdî and the Ass’s Foal
  - The Astute Qâdî
  - The Man Who Understood Women
- The Two Lives of Sultan Mahmûd
- The Unending Treasure
- Princess Zulaykhâ
- Sweet tales of Careless Youth
  - Hard-Head and His Sister Little-Foot
  - The Anklet
  - The He-goat and the King’s Daughter
  - The Prince and the Tortoise
  - The Chick-pea Seller’s Daughter
  - The Loser
  - The Captain of Police
  - A Contest in Generosity
- Prince Diamond
- Some Jests and Suggestions
- Baybars and the Captain Tales (Mardrus versions):
  - The Second Captain’s Tale
  - The Third Captain’s Tale
  - The Fourth Captain’s Tale
  - The Fifth Captain’s Tale
  - The Sixth Captain’s Tale
  - The Eighth Captain’s Tale
  - The Ninth Captain’s Tale
  - The Tenth Captain’s Tale
  - The Eleventh Captain’s Tale
  - The Twelfth Captain’s Tale
- The Sea Rose of the Girl of China
- Windows on the Garden of History
  - The Poet Durayd
  - ‘Ufayra the Suns, and Hudhayla the Moons
  - Princess Fâtima and the poet Muraqqish
  - The Vengeance of King Hujr
  - Men in the Judgment of Their Wives
  - ‘Umar ibn al-Khattâb
  - Blue Salama the Singer
  - The Parasite
  - The Slave of Destiny
  - The Fatal Collar
  - Ishâq of Mosul and the Lost Melody
  - The Two Dancers
- The End of Ja‘far and the Barmakids
- Prince Yâsmîn and Princess Almond

=== Wortley Montague ===
Tales from the unique Wortley Montague's Arabic manuscript. Not translated by Burton. They were translated to German by Felix Tauer (1989).

- The Vizier’s Clever Daughter
- Sultan Qâyish, His Brother Ardashîr and the Emir ‘Urwa
- The Maiden Who Was Transformed into a Gazelle
- The Wife and Her Two Lovers
- The Ten Slave-Girls
- The Admonished Adulteress
- The Coward Belied by His Wife
- The Numskull Who Does Not Count the Ass He Is Sitting on
- The Three Corpses
- ‘Alî with the Large Member
- The Peasant’s Beautiful Wife
- Mûsâ and Ibrâhîm
- The Stupid Berbers
- The Two Viziers and Their Children
- The Lover Exposed by Way of a Special Perfume
- The Silly Woman Who Wanted to Blind Her Stepson
- Oft-proved Fidelity
- Zunnâr ibn Zunnâr
- Shaykh Nakkît
- Sitt al-Banât and the King of Irak’s Son
- Sultan Taylun and the Generous Man
- The Soothsayer and His Apprentice
- The Merchant’s Daughter Who Married the King of China

=== Reinhardt ===
Tales from the unique Reinhardt's Arabic manuscript. They had been studied, but not translated.

- Hasan, the Love-stricken
- Hasan, the Old Poet
- Yâsamîn and Husayn the Butcher
- Muhammad of Damascus and Sa‘d of Baghdad
- Qamar al-Zamân and Shams
- Alexander the Great and the Water of Life
- Solomon
- King Sabâ
- Alexander the Great
- Hâyid’s Expedition to the Sources of the Nile
- The Barmakids
- Abû Hasan, the Old Man Who Bemoans Ja‘far
- Al-Mundhir ibn al-Mughîra who Bemoans Ja‘far
- Al- Ma’mûn and the Parasite
- ‘Alî al-Khawâja
- Hasan, the Youth Whose Wishes Are Fulfilled
- Zahr al-Rawd
- Sayf ibn Dhî Yazan
- ‘Abbâs
- Ma‘dîkarib
- Ma‘n Obtains Pardon for a Rebel
- It is Impossible to Arouse the Anger of Ma‘n
- Ishâq and the Roses
- The Kiss
- Al-Ma’mûn and the Kilabite Girl
- Sayf al-Tîjân
- Hasan, the King of Egypt
- Fâris al-Khayl and al-Badr al-Fâyiq
- Mâlik ibn Mirdâs
- Sirkhâb and Aftûna
- Dâmir and al-‘Anqâ’
- Mahmûd and His Three Sons
- The Omanite

== Not numbered in the Arabian Nights Encyclopedia ==
=== Other manuscripts ===
Those tales are present in manuscripts of the Nights, but don't have numeration in the Arabian Nights Encyclopedia

- Earliest manuscripts (Vi 33 in Tubingen and KFCRIS 2415 in Saudi Arabia)
  - Sul and Shumul
- Third Shakyh's story Variants:
  - Variant in the Anderson manuscript.
  - Variant in the manuscript París 3615.
  - Variant in the Maillet manuscript.
  - Variant in the Gayangos/Madrid manuscript.
  - Variant in the Wortley Montague manuscript.
  - Variant in the Turkish PB Group of manuscripts
- From the Maillet manuscript:
  - Khaylajān Ibn Hāman al-Fārisī
  - Two Old Men
    - Bāz al-Ashhab Abū Lahaba
  - Adventures of a traveler who enters a pond and undergoes metamorphoses there (Incomplete)
  - Anecdotes
  - Kalila wa Dimna ( incomplete)
    - Lion and the Bull
    - Defense of Dimna
    - The Sincere Friends
    - The Owls and the Ravens
    - The Monkey and the Tortoise
    - The Monk and the Weasel
    - The Rat and the Cat
    - The King and the Bird
    - The Lion and the Jackal
    - The History of Iladh, Beladh, Irakht, and the wise Kibarioun.
    - The Lioness and the Horseman
    - The Monk and his Guest
    - The Traveller and the Goldsmith
    - The King's Son and His Companions
- In the Anderson manuscript's family:
  - The flying chair
  - Story of Ahmed the Orphan (in Craft and Malice of Women)
- In the Gayangos/Madrid Manuscript:
  - Juha Anecdote (inside tale of the barber 5th brother)
- Tubingen recension, Sabbagh Manuscript. and turkish FiveT Recension
  - Story of Jamîl and Buthayna (Inside the saga of Umar al Numan)
- More tales on the Fable Cycle (Kayseri Manuscript's family):
  - F03:The Pious Shepherd
  - F07:Fayrūz and Samʿān
  - F08:The Two Eagles and the Weasel
  - F17:The Butcher and His Wife
  - F21:The Weasel and the Sparrow
  - F23:The Jealous Crane
  - F24:The King and the Francolines
  - F25:The King and His Son
- From the Manuscripts British Library ADD 7405 and 7406:
  - King al-‘Ādil and his daughter Sitt al-Salātīn
  - The Dervish and Nūr al-Ṣabāḥ
  - Hasan, son of the Shahbandar of Damascus, and Kawkab, daughter of the king (incomplete)
- From Manuscript Berlin, Staatsbibliothek We. 701:
  - Different variant of the story of Second Kalender
- From Manuscript Berlin, Staatsbibliothek We. 521 and 663:
  - Story of the khawāja ‘Abd al-Raḥmān ibn al-shaykh ‘Abdallāh and Dāmiriyya, daughter of the king (Chauvin no. 4)
  - Muhammad Ibn Ibrâhîm and Ja‘far al-Barmakî
  - Salâm al-nadîm (unfinished)
- Wortley Montague manuscript:
  - Mazin of Khorasan (Variant of Hasan of Basra)
- From Chavis and Sabbagh Manuscript:
  - The Bimaristan/The Unfortunate Youth in the Madhouse (Variant of the Story of the First Lunatic)
  - Part of "Marvels of Destiny in the History of Tamerlane" (In Sabbagh Ms. Bayerische Staatsbibliothek 629)
- Manuscript in London British Library IO ISL 444:
  - Hārūn al-Rashīd and What Happened to Him with Manṣūr of Damascus (unfinished)
- Al-Azhar-Manuscript in Cairo, Azhar 133414/adab 9484:
  - Aladdin and the Golden Lamp for al-Sayyida Nafisa
  - Aladdin and the Elixir
  - Aladdin and the Mule Mare
    - Sitt Kan
- Arabic Beirut Print Edition (1888 -1890)
  - The Smith Bâsim and Hârûn al-Rashîd
- Turkish Beyânî Translation (Manuscript BnF turc 356.2 - 356.9):
  - Story of Abdallah of Basra.
  - Story of ʿIṭāf ben Ismāʿil aš-Šaqlānī, the old man Abū Baraka al-Nawām (the Sleeper) and the girl Waldān.
  - the Story of Aḥmed-i Ṣaġī̇r (The younger) and Şams e͗l-Ṣuqūr
  - The Story of Quwwat al-Qulūb
- More stories of the Fable Cycle: (Turkish FiveT Recension)
  - Tale of the King of Wild Beasts (F07:Fayrūz and Samʿān)
  - Tale of the lonely Crane (F021:The Crane and the Crab )
  - Tale of the avaricious man of Hind and his pious neighbor
  - Seven short stories of Mazīduʾl-ḫalīʿ, the salacious companion
  - Three short stories of blind men
- Turkish Manuscript R Ankara, B499
  - Story of Nūr al-Dīn ʿAlī of Damascus and Sitt-i Dünyā.(Also un Beyânî Translation)
  - Story of Qamar, son of Malik Maḥmūd, king of Persia (Variant of Say al Muluk)

=== Hanna Diyab ===
Tales that Hanna Diyab told to Gallant, that were not included in Gallant's translation. Only left as summaries on Gallant diaries. Not numbered in the ANE.

- Qamar al-dīn and Badr al-Budūr
- The Golden City
- The Sultan of Samarkand and His Three Sons (summary on supplementary nights vol 6)
- The Purse, the Dervish’s Horn, the Figs, and the Horns
- Hasan the Seller of Herbal Tea

=== Chavis and Cazotte ===
Tales from the Continuation des Mille et Une Nuits (1798-1799) by Chavis and Cazotte, from unknown sources, possibly Cazotte own imagination.

- L’Imbécile, ou L’Histoire de Xaïloun (The Fool, or Story of Xaïlun)
- L’Histoire d’Alinbengiad, sultan d’Herak, et des faux oiseaux du paradis (The Story of Alinbengiad, Sultan of Herak, and His Fake Birds from Paradise)
- L’Histoire de la famille du Schebandad de Surate (The Story of the Family of Schebandad of Surate)
  - L’Amant des étoiles, conte de Cabil Hasen (The Lover of the Stars: Story of Cabil-Hasen)
  - Les Prouesses et la mort du capitaine Tranchemont et de ses braves (The Valiant Deeds and Death of Captain Tranchemont and His Brave Ones)
  - Le Rêve de Valid-Hasen (Valid-Hasen’s Dream)
- Histoire du Maugraby, ou le Magicien (History of Maugraby or, the Magician)
  - Histoire d'Alaiaddin, prince de Perse (History of Halaiaddin (’Alà al-Din), Prince of Persia.)
  - Histoire d'Yamallaiaddin, prince du Grand Katay (History of Yemaladdin (Jamál al-Dín), Prince of Great Katay.)
  - Histoire de Baha-Ildin, prince de Cinigaé (History of Baha-Ildur, Prince of Cinigae.)
  - Histoire de Baduildinn, Prince de Tartaria (History of Badrildinn (Badr al-Dín), Prince of Tartary)
  - Histoire de Shahadildin, prince de Damas (History of Shahadildin), Prince of Damascus)
  - Histoire des amours du Maugraby avec sœur des planètes, fille du roi d'Égypte (History of the Amours of Maugraby with Auhata al-Kawakik (Ukht al-Kawákib, Sister of the Planets), daughter of the King of Egypt.)
  - Histoire de la naissance du Maugraby (History of the Birth of Maugraby.)

=== Antonelli ===
Unique tales featured in the Italian edition published by Giacomo Antonelli & Co. (1852). Although this edition claimed to include stories from the French edition by Destains, it actually drew upon the French edition by Pourrat, which contained a preface by Jules Janin (1837–1838).

Consequently, Antonelli expanded Galland’s version by adding tales by Causin de Perceval, Scott, and Von Hammer. Furthermore, he incorporated stories exclusive to the Pourrat edition—tales that originated in earlier French collections of Oriental stories: those by Caylus (Nouveaux contes arabes, 1743) and the Abbé Blanchet (Apologues et contes orientaux, 1784).

- Storia di Naz-Rayyar, governatore di Babilonia, e d'un principe del Korassan(The Story of Naz-Rayyar, Governor of Babylon, and a Prince of Khorasan)
- Storia di Chadul, principessa dell'India (The Story of Chadul, Princess of India)
- Il saggio Koulai o l'Arte di risuscitare i morti (The Sage Koulai, or the Art of Resurrecting the Dead)
- Storia di Naerdan e di Guzulbee (The Story of Naerdan and Guzulbee)
- Storia di Dgerberi il Facchino (The Story of Dgerberi the Porter)
- Storia degli Uccelli della Montagna di Kaf (The Story of the Birds of the Mountain of Kaf)
- Storia del Canestro (The Story of the Basket)
- Il Paradiso di Schedad (The Paradise of Schedad)

=== Caise ===
Tales unique to the "Contes oubliés des Mille et une nuits" (Forgotten Tales from the One Thousand and One Nights) french edition by Albert Caise in 1893, presenting a collection of algerian folktales:

- Zoleikra ou le soueur criminelle (Zoleikra or the Criminal Sister)
- Les pommes de Ralia bent-Mannsour (The apples of Ralia bent Mansour)
- La djinnia et les jumeaux . (The Djinnia and the Twins)
- Le lion noir du Zaccar. (The Black Lion of Zaccar)
- Les aventures extraordinaires d'un fumeur de kif (The Extraordinary Adventures of a Kif-Smoker ).
- L'homme à la fève(The Man with the Bean)
- Les voleurs de la Kasba. (The Thieves of the Kasbah)
- L'oeuf de serpent. (The Serpent's Egg)
- Le bûcheron et le génie. (The Woodcutter and the Genie)
- La bague noire (The Black Ring)
- Le chacal et le lion.(The Jackal and the Lion)

=== Cansinos-Asséns ===
Tales unique to the Spanish translation done by writter Rafael Cansinos-Asséns as "El Libro de las Mil y una Noches" (1955) published in Mexico. Many of his sources are unknown:

- Historia del inoportuno oportuno. (The Story of the Timely Untimely Man)
- Historia de Mojarrik y la esclava. (Story of Mukhāriq and the female slave)
- La princesa mendiga.(The Beggar Princess)
- El poeta desconfiado. (The distrustful poet)
- ANECDOTAS REFERENTES A LOS TACAÑOS (Anecdotes regarding misers)
  - Historia del jalifa Al-Manzur y el falso beduino. (The Story of Caliph Al-Mansur and the False Bedouin)
  - El guasón y el avaro. (The joker and the miser)
- Versos del elogio y de vejamen (Verses of praise and mockery)
- ANECDOTAS REFERENTES AL SENTIMIENTO PRODUCIDO POR LA CAIDA DE LOS BENI-BARMEK (*Anecdotes regarding the sentiment aroused by the fall of the Banu-Barmek)
  - El schej agradecido (The grateful sheikh)
- Historia del joven enamorado de su prima y el ardid que se valió para conseguirla (The story of the young man in love with his cousin and the ruse he employed to win her)
- Historia de las tres esclavas (The Story of the Three Slave Girls)
- Historia de la bala de arrezaz. (History of the arrezaz bullet)
- Anécdotas donosas referentes principalmente a borrachos. (Graceful anecdotes referring mainly to drunks)
- De la disputa que entre si hubieron el cirio y el vino. (Of the dispute that arose between the wax candle and the wine)
- De la disputa que entre si el aire y el agua. (On the dispute between air and water)
- Disputa entre el aceite y la carne. (Dispute between oil and meat)
- De la disputa que entre si hubieron los árabes de la ciudad y los beduinos. (On the dispute that arose between the Arabs of the city and the Bedouins)
- Historia de los dos amigos
- Historia del rey desengañado del mundo
- El pecador arrepentido
- Historia de la muerta de amor a Alá
- La lección de ascetísmo,
- El poder de la palabra de Alá.
- Historia del guali, la esclava y el jalifa
- Historia del hijo de rey y sus compañeros
- SILVA DE ANECDOTAS DONOSAS
  - Choja y el azor
  - Soliman, el tragaldabas
  - Un pastor original
  - El borracho y su hijo
  - El pleito de las barbas
  - Aachab, el ansioso
  - El vendedor de colirios
  - Choja, limosnero
  - El pobre y el cadi
  - Al-Mutanabbi hace honor a su poesia
  - El beduino y el atleta
  - Choja y su ropa
  - El narigudo y su novia
  - Consejo prudente
  - El avaro enfermo
  - El buen hijo y Al-Azmai
  - Abu-Nuás y el borracho
  - Abud, el dormilón
  - Historia del que se pasó de listo
  - Al Motazim e Ibn-Chenaid
  - Ishak-ben-Ibrahim el músico y el azacán
- HISTORIA DEL JALIFA OMAR Y LA VIEJA
  - Y los almuédanos
  - Historia de la voz que clamaba en la noche
- Historia de la sala fatídica
- La caceria de amor
- Historia del mas cobarde y el mas astuto y el mas valiente
- Historia de lo que pasó entre Yakub-ben-Yúsuf y el rey Adfonsch
- Historia del guerrero que tomó el solo una ciudad
- Jalifas y beduinos
- Historia de Jalid-ben-Zafuán, el jalifa As Saffag y Umm-Selma, su esposa
- Historia del jalifa Al-Hadi y el rebelde
- Historia de una canción
- Historias referentes a la generosidad y el saber y los dos modos de ser generoso
- Historia de la reina Sebá (Story of the Queen Sebá)
- Historia de Belkis, la hija de Scherahil (Story of Belkis, daughter of Scherahil)
- De como empezaron los amores entre Antara, el poeta y Abla, su señora (How began the love between Antara, the poet and his lady, Abla)
- Historia de los amores de Chamil y Botsaina (Story of the love of Chamil and Botsaina)
- Historia de Rabutu-l-Abuyet, la asceta (The Story of Rabutu-l-Abuyet, the Ascetic)
- Historia de Cherir, hijo de Atiyet-benu-Jatafi (The Story of Cherir, son of Atiyet-benu-Jatafi)
- El sabio Lokmán (The sage Lokman)
- Ben-Sadet, el elocuente (Ben-Sadet, the eloquent)
- Al-Kisai, el émulo de Sibuyet (*Al-Kisai, the emulator of Sibuyet)
- Historia de Sibuyet, el gramatico (Story of Sibuyet, the grammatician)
- Ibrahim-ben-Adham, el hijo de reyes (Ibrahim ibn Adham, son of kings)
- Abu-Yusuf y Abu-Hanifa (Abu Yusuf and Abu Hanifa)
- Sobeida, hija de Chafar
- Historia de la muerte de Said-ben-Chabir, el martir
- El hombre y los ladrones
- El pintor y los rateros
- El pintor y su critico
- ANECDOTAS DE CARÁCTER DONOSO, REFERENTE A LOCOS, POETAS Y DEMAS GENTE RARA
  - El loco discreto
  - La barba de Abu-Nuas
  - Un hombre delicado
  - Hamduna, la cantora y el supuesto loco
  - Historia de los ladrones y el rayo de luna
  - Historia del mercader y los tres maestrillos
  - Aschab, el ansioso
- Historia de la mujer petrificada y su amante
- Un encuentro fatal
- DOS HISTORIAS DE MONARCAS JUSTICIEROS
  - El jalifa, el visir y la mocita
  - Historia del Sultan Tulun y el emir Al-Fil
- Historia de Chiblt-benu-l-Aiham, el almogataz
- Historia de Chundaba y la Matadora de brutos
- El amante reservado
- Historia de Ummara la cantora
- Historia del joven pobre que se cansó de serlo
- Historia del tofail, hijo del tofail
- Historia de la bayadera decapitada
- Rosas y versos
- DICHOS MEMORABLES DE LOS SABIOS QUE ESCRIBIERON SOBRE TEMAS DIVERSOS
  - Las señales del amor
  - Elogio del libro
  - Historia del sabio extranjero y el jalifa Al-Mamun
  - Humildad de Ar-Raschid ante los sabios
  - Historia del sin Dios y su castigo
  - Educación y naturaleza
- Historia del anacorata y el ratoncillo
- Historia del grave apuro en que se vio Ishak-ben-Ibrahim, el musico
- Al Mutanabbi y su amigo
- La mula y el farol
- La mancha de dulce y el borron de tinta
- Historia del picaro y el guali
- Historia del falso profeta
- Donosa historia del cadi y el jalifa
- Historia del culpado inocente
- Historia del scheij hopsitalario
- El pleito de los maridos
- Historia de Harunu-r-Raschid y el asceta
- Anécdotas referentes a talismanes y milagros
- Historia del poeta Abu-Dilama y el jalifa As-Saffah
- El poder de la palabra
- Historia de Abdu-l-Lah-ben-Meruán con el jalifa Al-Manzur
- Historia del abogado de si mismo 7
- Historia de Al-Abbas y su bienhechor
- Dialogo entre Salomón y el búho
- Historia del dialogo que tuvieron el búho y su compañera
- El mono y la tortuga
- El hijo del rey y el ignorante
- Consejos del sabio Lokmán a su hijo
- Palabras postreras de Ali-ben-Abu-Taleb

== See also ==
- List of characters within One Thousand and One Nights
