= Les Mille et Une Nuits =

18th-century French translation of Arabian Nights

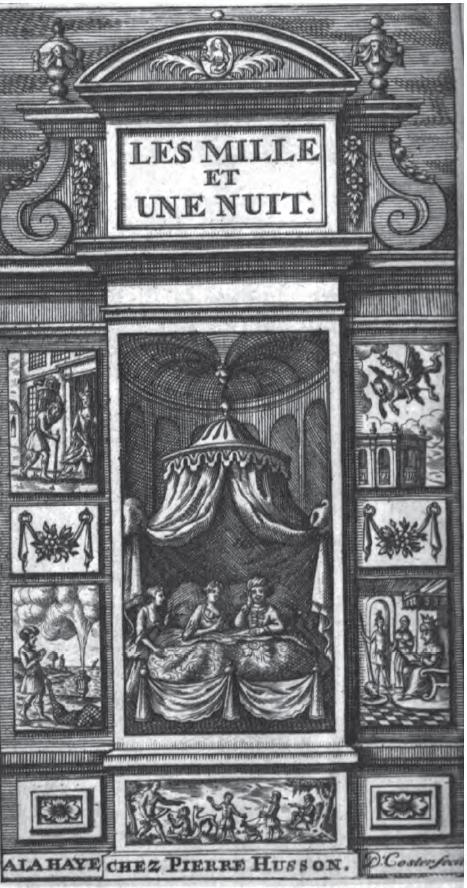
Illustration from Galland's Les Mille et Une Nuit, Contes Arabes, Vol. 2, by Pierre Husson, The Hague, 1714, by Dutch artist David Coster (1686–1752): Shahrazad tells her story to Shahryār, while her sister Dunyazad listens. Note other stories in the smaller panels (e.g., "The Ebony Horse" and "The Fisherman and the Jinn").

Les Mille et Une Nuits (Note: The word une may also be uncapitalized in French typography. The title was originally spelt without an s: Les Mille et Une Nuit.) (French: [le mil e yn nɥi], lit. 'The Thousand and One Nights'), subtitled contes arabes traduits en français (lit. 'Arab stories translated into French') and published in 12 volumes between 1704 and 1717, was the first European version of The Thousand and One Nights tales.

The French translation by Antoine Galland (1646–1715) derived from an Arabic text of the Syrian recension of the medieval work as well as from other sources. It included stories not found in the original Arabic manuscripts — the so-called "orphan tales" — such as the famous "Aladdin" and "Ali Baba and the Forty Thieves", which first appeared in print in Galland's collection. Literary scholars Ruth B. Bottigheimer and Paulo Lemos Horta have argued that Hanna Diyab should be understood as the original author of some of the orphan tales, and even that several of them, including Aladdin, were partly inspired by Diyab's own life.

Immensely popular at the time of initial publication by the house of the late Claude Barbin, and enormously influential later, Galland's published tales were supplemented by subsequent volumes, introduced using Galland's name - although some stories were produced by others at the behest of a publisher wanting to capitalize on the popularity of Galland's work.

== History ==
Galland had come across a manuscript of "The Tale of Sindbad the Sailor" in Constantinople during the 1690s and in 1701 he published his French translation of it. He was informed that Sinbad was part of larger collection of tales named The Thousand and One Nights. His success with Sinbad encouraged him to embark on a translation of a 14th-century Syrian manuscript of The Thousand and One Nights. The first two volumes of this work, under the title Les mille et une nuit, appeared in 1704, with volumes three to seven published in 1705 and 1706.

Galland translated the first part of his work mainly from the Syrian manuscript, and he possibly collated it with a shorter Turkish manuscript of the Nights (BnF, turc 356 XI).He did not find any manuscript of the nights with Sinbad, so he added his previous translation of an independent Sinbad manuscript (BnF, ar. 3645) to his volumes.(Manuscripts with Sinbad existed at the time but were very rare)

Galland translated two more stories (Ghanim and Sleeper and the Waker) from a fourth volume, an independent manuscript of the romance of Umar al Numan, but did not use more material of the manuscript (Paris, BnF, Ms. ar. 3893). Umar-al Numan was a usual part of the Arabic and Turkish versions of the The Thousand and One Nights of Galland's time

Galland translated tales were not enough for another complete volume. Frustrated, Galland's publisher Claude Barbin published Ghanim along with two ales of François Pétis de la Croix's translations of the Turkish Ferec baʿd eş-şidde (later published as Les Mille et Un Jours in 1710–12) as the eighth volume in 1709. The tales were Zayn al Asman and Codadad and his Brothers. This act outraged Galland, who switched publishers for all subsequent volumes.

In 1709 Galland was introduced to a young Syrian Christian—a Maronite from Aleppo known as Youhenna (“Hanna”) Diab. Galland's diary (March 25, 1709) records that he met Hanna through Paul Lucas, a French traveler who had used him as an interpreter brought him to Paris. Hanna recounted 14 stories to Galland from his repertoire and Galland chose to write them down. Hanna also gave him an Arabic manuscript of Aladdin (lost to time). At the end of the day, Galland included seven of the tales in his book. These are the tales called "Orphan tales" and are actually not translations but new additions directly written and expanded by Galland after what he heard from Diyab. These new stories include Aladin and Ali Baba. For example, Galland's diary tells that the version of "Aladdin" that he wrote was made in the winter of 1709–10, based on Hanna's manuscript. It was included in his volumes IX and X, published in 1710. The final two volumes were published posthumously in 1717.

Galland adapted his translation to the taste of the times. The immediate success the tales enjoyed was partly due to the vogue for fairy stories—in French, contes de fees—which had been started in France in the 1690s by Galland's friend Charles Perrault. Galland was also eager to conform to the literary canons of the era. He cut many of the erotic passages out along with all of the poetry. This modifications caused later translators to criticize him. For example, Sir Richard Burton refer to "Galland's delightful abbreviation and adaptation" which "in no wise represent[s] the eastern original."

Galland's translation was greeted with immense enthusiasm and was soon further translated into many other European languages:

- English (a "Grub Street" version of 1706 under the title Arabian Nights Entertainments)
- German (1712)
- Italian (1722)
- Dutch (1732)
- Russian (1763)
- Polish (1768)

These produced a wave of imitations and the widespread 18th century fashion for oriental tales.

== Contents ==
=== Volume 1 ===
- À Madame la Marquise d’O
- Avertissement

Les Mille et une Nuits, contes arabes

- "L'Ane, le Boeuf et le Laboureur" ("The Fable of the Ass, the Ox, and the Labourer")
- "Fable de Chien et du Boeuf" ("The Fable of the Dog and the Ox")
- "Le Marchand et le Génie" ("The Merchant and the Genie")
- "Histoire du premier Vieillard-Baron et de la Biche" ("The History of the first Old Man and the Doe")
- "Histoire du second Vieillard et des deux Chiens noirs" ("The Story of the second Old Man and the two black Dogs")
- "Histoire du Pècheur" ("The Story of the Fisherman")
- "Histoire du Roi grec et du Medecin Douban" ("The Story of the Grecian King and the Physician Douban")
- "Histoire du Mari et du Perroquet" ("History of the Husband and the Parrot")
- "Histoire du Vizir puni" ("History of the Vizier that was punished")
- "Histoire du jeune Roi des iles Noires" ("The Story of the young King of the Black Isles")
- "Histoire de trois Calenders, fils de Roi, et de cinq dames de Bagdad" ("History of three Calendars, Sons of King, and Five Ladies of Bagdad")

=== Volume 2 ===
- "Histoire du premier Calender, fils de Roi" ("History of the First Calendar, son of King")
- "Histoire du second Calender, fils de Roi" ("The Story of the Second Calendar, son of King")
- "Histoire de l'Envieux et de l'Envie" ("History of the envious Man, and of him that he envied")
- "Histoire du troisième Calender, fils de Roi" ("The Story of the Third Calendar, son of King")
- "Histoire de Zobéide" ("The Story of Zobeide")
- "Histoire d'Amine" ("The Story of Amine")

=== Volume 3 ===
- "Histoire de Sindbad le Marin" ("The Story of Sindbad the Sailor")
  - "Premier voyage de Sindbad le marin" ("His First Voyage")
  - "Deuxieme voyage de Sindbad le marin" ("The Second Voyage of Sindbad the Sailor")
  - "Troisième voyage de Sindbad le marin" ("The Third Voyage of Sindbad the Sailor")
  - "Quatrième voyage de Sindbad le marin" ("The Fourth Voyage of Sindbad the Sailor")
  - "Cinquième voyage de Sindbad le marin" ("The Fifth Voyage of Sindbad the Sailor")
  - "Sixième voyage de Sindbad le marin" ("The Sixth Voyage of Sindbad the Sailor")
  - "Septième et dernier voyage de Sindbad le marin" ("The Seventh and last Voyage of Sindbad the Sailor")
- "Les Trois Pommes" ("The Three Apples")
- "Histoire de la dame massacree et du jeune homme son mari" ("The Story of the Lady that was murdered, and of the young Man her Husband")
- "Histoire de Noureddin Ali, et de Bedreddin Hassan" ("The Story of Noureddin Ali and Bedreddin Hassan")

=== Volume 4 ===
- "Suite de l'Histoire de Noureddin Ali, et de Bedreddin Hassan" ("Continuation of the Story of Noureddin Ali and of Bedreddin Hassan")
- "Histoire du petit Bossu" ("History of the Little Hunchback")
- "Histoire que raconta le Marchand chretien" ("The Story told by the Christian Merchant")
- "Histoire racontée par le pourvoyeur du sultan de Casgar" ("The Story told by the Sultan of Casgar's Purveyor")
- "Histoire racontée par le médecin juif" ("The Story told by the Jewish Physician")
- "Histoire que raconta le Tailleur" ("The Story told by the Tailor")

=== Volume 5 ===
- "Suite de l'Histoire que raconta le Tailleur" ("Continuation of the Story told by the Tailor")
- "Histoire du Barbier" ("The Story of the Barber")
  - "Histoire du premier Frere du Barbier" ("The Story of the Barber's Eldest Brother")
  - "Histoire du second Frere du Barbier" ("The Story of the Barrber's Second Brother")
  - "Histoire du troisieme Frere du Barbier" ("The Story of the Barber's Third Brother")
  - "Histoire du quatrieme Frere du Barbier" ("The Story of the Barber's Fourth Brother")
  - "Histoire du cinquieme Frere du Barbier" ("The Story of the Barber's Fifth Brother")
  - "Histoire du sixieme Frere du Barbier" ("The Story of the Barber's Sixth Brother")
- "Histoire d'Aboulhassan Ali Ebn Becar et de Schemselnihar, favorite du calife Haroun-al-Raschid" ("History of Aboulhassan Ali Ebn Becar and Schemselnihar, Favourite of Caliph Haroun-Al-Raschid")

=== Volume 6 ===
- "Suite de l'histoire de la Princesse de la Chine" ("Continuation of the story of the Princess of China")
- "Histoire de Marzavan avec la suite de celle de Camaralzaman" ("History of Marzavan with the continuation of that of Camaralzaman")
- "Séparation du Prince Camaralzaman d'avec la Princesse Badoure" ("Separation of Prince Camaralzaman from Princess Badoure")
- "Histoire de la Princesse Badoure apres la separation du Prince Camaralzaman" ("Story of Princess Badoure after the separation of Prince Camaralzaman")
- "Suite de l'histoire du Prince Camaralzaman, depuis sa separation d'avec la Princesse Badoure" ("Continuation of the story of Prince Camaralzaman, since his separation from Princess Badoure")
- "Histoire des Princes Amgiad et Assad" ("History of Princes Amgrad and Assad")
- "Le Prince Assad arrete en entrant dans la ville des Mages" ("Prince Assad arrests upon entering the city of the Magi")
- "Histoire du Prince Amgiad & d'une dame de la ville des Mages" ("Story of Prince Amgiad & a Lady from the City of the Magi")
- "Suite de l'Histoire du Prince Assad" ("Continuation of the Story of Prince Assad")

=== Volume 7 ===
- "Histoire de Noureddin et de la belle Persienne" ("The Story of Noureddin and the Fair Persian")
- "Histoire de Beder, prince de Perse, et de Giauhare, princesse du royaume du Samandal" ("The Story of Beder, Prince of Persia, and Giahaurre, Princess of the Kingdom of Samandal")

=== Volume 8 ===
- "Histoire de Ganem, Fils d'Abou Ayoub, surmomme l'Esclave d'Amour" ("The Story of Ganem, Son of Abou Ayoub, and known by the Surname of Love's Slave")
- "Histoire du prince Zein Alasnam et du roi des Génies" ("The Story of Prince Zeyn Alasnam, and the King of the Geniuses")
- "Histoire de Codadad et de ses frères" ("History of Codadad and his Brothers")
- "Histoire de la princesse Deryabar" ("The Story of the Princess of Deryabar")

=== Volume 9 ===
- "Histoire du dormeur éveillé" ("The Story of the Sleeper Awakened")
- "Histoire d'Aladdin ou la Lampe merveilleuse" ("The Story of Aladdin, or the Wonderful Lamp")

=== Volume 10 ===
- "Suite de l'Histoire d'Aladdin ou la Lampe merveilleuse" ("End of the Tale of Aladdin, or the Wonderful Lamp")
- "Les avantures de Calife Haroun Alraschid" (The Adventures of Caliph Haroun-Al-Raschid)
- "Histoire de l'Aveugle Baba-Alidalla" (The Story of the Blind Baba-Alidalla)
- "Histoire de Sidi Nouman" (History of Sidi Nouman)
- "Histoire de Cogia Hassan Alhababbal" (The Story of Cogia Hassan Alhababbal)

=== Volume 11 ===
- "Suite de l'Histoire de Cogia Hassan Alhababbal" (Continuation of the Story of Cogia Hassan Alhababbal)
- "Histoire d'Ali-Baba et de quarante voleurs exterminés par une esclave" ("Tale of Ali Baba and Forty Thieves Exterminated by a Slave")
- "Histoire d'Ali Cogia, Marchand de Bagdad" (The Story of Ali Cogia, Merchant of Baghdad)
- "Histoire du Cheval enchanté" (History of the Enchanted Horse) ("The Ebony Horse")

=== Volume 12 ===
- "Histoire du prince Ahmed et de la fee Pari-Banou" (History of Prince Ahmed and the Pari-Banou fairy)
- "Histoire des deux Soeurs jalouses de leur cadette" (The Story of the two sisters jealous of their younger sister) ("The Sisters Envious of Their Cadette")

== Influence ==
In a 1936 essay, Jorge Luis Borges wrote:

Another fact is undeniable. The most famous and eloquent encomiums of The Thousand and One Nights—by Coleridge, Thomas de Quincey, Stendhal, Tennyson, Edgar Allan Poe, Newman—are from readers of Galland's translation. Two hundred years and ten better translations have passed, but the man in Europe or the Americas who thinks of the Thousand and One Nights thinks, invariably, of this first translation. The Spanish adjective milyunanochesco [thousand-and-one-nights-esque] ... has nothing to do with the erudite obscenities of Burton or Mardrus, and everything to do with Antoine Galland's bijoux and sorceries.

== Editions ==
=== First publication ===
- 1704–1717: Les mille et une nuit, contes arabes traduits en François, par M. Galland, Paris: la Veuve Claude Barbin, In-12. 12 vols.
  - Vols. 1, 2, 3, 4, 5, 6 = 1704–1705, Paris: la Veuve Claude Barbin
  - Vol. 7 = 1706, Paris: la Veuve Claude Barbin
  - Vol. 8 = 1709, Paris: la Boutique de Claude Barbin, chez la veuve Ricoeur
  - Vols. 9, 10 = 1712, Paris: Florentin Delaulne
  - Vols. 11, 12 = 1717, Lyon: Briasson

=== Subsequent editions ===
- The longest volume in the Bibliothèque de la Pléiade series is Les Mille et Une Nuits I, II et III, at 3,504 pages.
- Les mille et une nuits as translated by Galland (Garnier Flammarrion edition, 1965)

== See also ==
- Open Sesame (phrase)

== Sources ==
- Daupeley, Gustave (1880). Le compositeur et le correcteur typographes (in French).
