= Vat. Ar. =

Vat. Ar. abbreviates Vaticani arabi, a collection within the Vatican Library. Notable works within this collection include the following:

- Vat. Ar. 5, Psalter in Arabic
- Vat. Ar. 182, Al-Razi's Al-Tibb al-Ruhani
- Vat. Ar. 204, Naskh-Ottoman Quran manuscript
- Vat. Ar. 230, Quran manuscript
- Vat. ar. 319, 13th century diagram of the Tusi couple, by Tusi
- Vat. Ar. 368, The Story of Bayad and Riyad, 13th-century Arabic love story
- Vat. ar. 657, Eliya ibn ʿUbaid's Concordance of Faith
- Vat. Ar. 709, Quran manuscript
- Vat. Ar. 782, 16thC copy of Galland Manuscript
- Vat. Ar. 924, Quran manuscript, small circle of 45mm diameter, Octagonal case
- Vat. Ar. 931, Quran manuscript
- Vat. Ar. 1484, Quran manuscript, largest in library, 540x420mm.
- Vat. Ar. 1605/1, additional folia to the Codex Parisino-petropolitanus
