= Denis Chavis =

Syrian priest and monk (fl. 1780s)

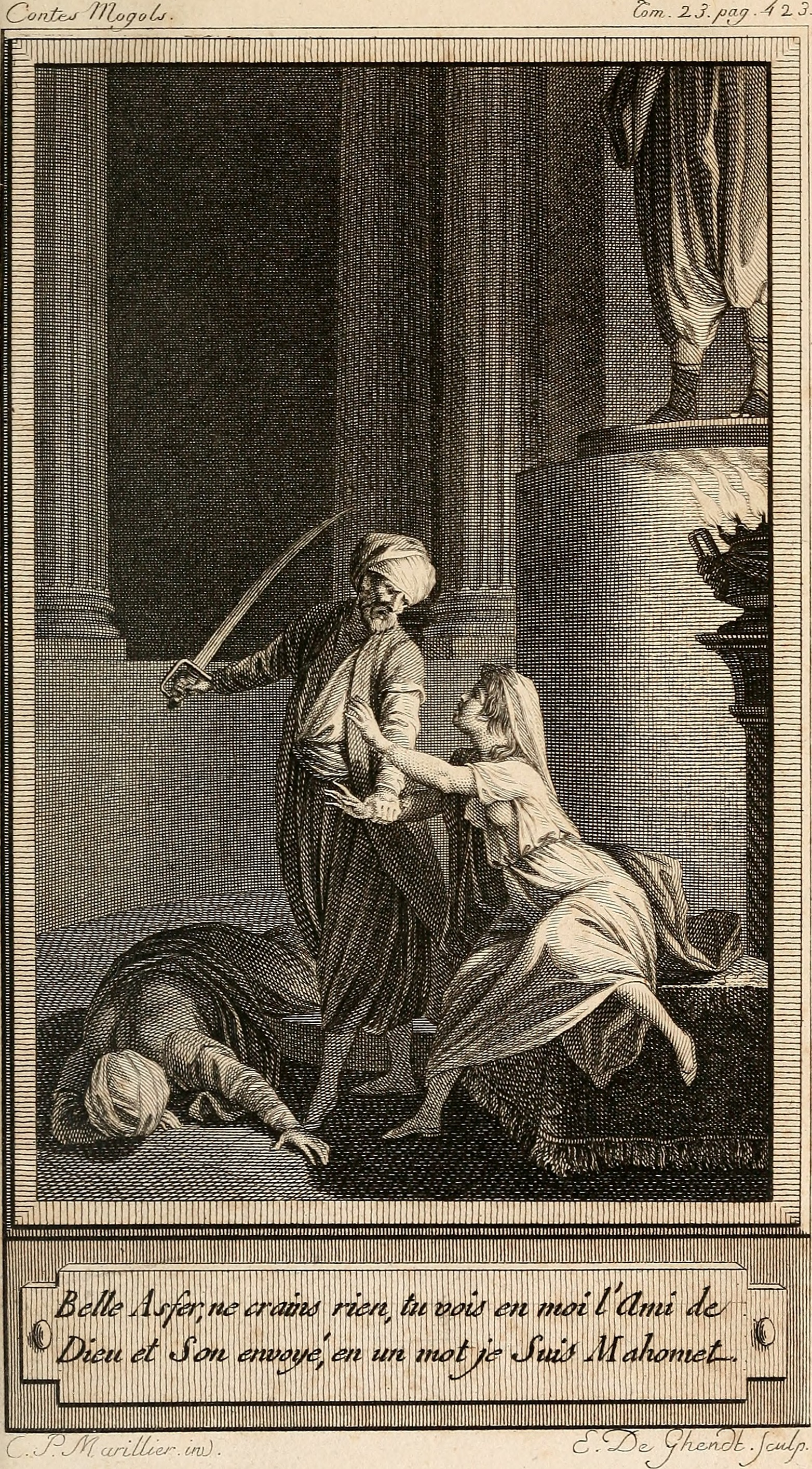
An image from Le Cabinet des fées - Les Mille et Une Nuits. Contes arabes traduits en français par Antoine Galland, to which text Chavis added new stories.

Dom Denis Chavis (as he was known in French) or Dīyūnisūs Shāwīsh (as he called himself in his native language, Arabic: ديونيسوس شاويش) was a Syrian priest and monk who flourished in the 1780s. He was a key contributor to the version of the Thousand and One Nights published as Continuation des Mille et Une Nuits in Geneva in 1788–89, which had a lasting influence on conceptions of the contents of the Nights.

== Life ==
Little is known about Chavis's biography, and what is known mainly comes from the preface to his Continuation des Mille et Une Nuits, a colophon to his manuscript of the Nights, and occasional details in surviving correspondence; no Eastern sources for his life have been identified. He was from Syria, and described himself as "a former student at the Greek School named after Saint Athanasius in Constantinople". He was brought to Paris under the auspices of Baron de Breteuil, where he taught Arabic at the Bibliothèque du Roi, presumably, in the assessment of Daniel L. Newman, to 'the so-called Jeunes de langue, young boys destined for a career as a dragoman (interpreter) in French consulates in the Ottoman Empire'. He is thought to have arrived in Paris in 1783.

== Work ==
=== The Chavis Manuscript ===
While in Paris, Chavis was short of money, and sought to capitalise on a revival of interest in Oriental literature that was going on in the 1780s. At that time, the Nights were known in France only through the seminal French rendering published by Antoine Galland in 1704–17, Les mille et une nuits, contes arabes traduits en français. Galland had based his French text on the three-volume and infamously incomplete Galland Manuscript, which he had supplemented with extra stories from sources both written and oral.

Chavis set about producing a manuscript which he intended to present as a copy of a more complete Galland Manuscript than really existed—one that would provide Arabic-language 'sources' for tales whose only written form was Galland's French. He began copying the Galland Manuscript, and as he did so, he adapted his exemplar, adding in some contemporary Syrianisms and more vulgar language for dramatic effect. At the point in the manuscript's sequence of stories where Galland had inserted the tale of Sindbad the Sailor in his Mille et une nuits, Chavis added (as Nights 70-76) Harun al-Rashid and the Daughter of Kisra from another Arabic manuscript. Chavis copied almost all of the three volumes of the Galland Manuscript, breaking off in the story Jullanar of the Sea. Chavis's two-volume copy of the Galland Manuscript remains in the Bibliothèque Nationale.

Having copied most of the real Galland Manuscript, Chavis proceeded to produce a further manuscript, purportedly a copy of newly identified fourth and fifth volumes of the Galland Manuscript (now Bibliothèque Nationale, MSS arabes 3616). He began by picking up where the real Galland Manuscript leaves off—partway through the Tale of Qamar al-Zamān and Budūr (a.k.a. Qamarazzman), its ending lost because the Galland Manuscript is incomplete. Chavis completed this by translating the fuller French version constructed by Galland. Chavis then proceeded to include some other tales translated from Galland's French into Arabic, and some which he copied from a manuscript of stories in Arabic that he seems to have brought with him from Syria. Now in the Bibliothèque Nationale, this Arabic manuscript had been made by the scribe 'Abīd Rabbih in 1772. It does not style itself as a Nights manuscript but merely a collection of tales (though some do also occur in manuscripts of the Nights). The following table lists the contents of Chavis's third volume.

Tale	Nights	Supposed Galland MS volume	Actual source
End of Qamarazzaman	281-329	4	Translated into Arabic from Galland, Nuits, vol. 6
The Sleeper Awakened	330-379	4	Translated into Arabic from Galland, Nuits, vol. 9
The Persian Physician and the Young Cook	380-400	4	Copied from Chavis own Arabic MS
The Unfortunate Youth in the Madhouse	400-427	4	Copied from Chassis own Arabic MS
Ghanim	428-474	5	Translated into Arabic from Galland, Nuits, vol. 8
Zayna Al-Asnam	475-491	5	Translated into Arabic from Petis de la Croix, Nuits, vol. 8
Aladdin	492-569	5	Translated into Arabic from Galland, Nuits, vol. 9
Baktzad and The Ten Viziers	570-631	5	Copied from Chavis Arabic MS

Chavis's translation of Aladdin is particularly noteworthy. Galland's source for this story was Hanna Diyab, who had apparently composed Aladdin himself and passed the tale to Galland in written form (whether in Arabic or French is not known). Since Diyab's manuscript of the story has never been found, Chavis's translation stands as the first known version of Aladdin in Arabic, and for many years scholars mistakenly thought it might represent a pre-Galland manuscript tradition of this story.

The Chavis Manuscript, deposited in the Bibliothèque du Roi along with some other manuscripts copied by Chavis, was later translated into French by Caussin de Perceval and published as volumes 8 and 9 of his new edition of Galland's Les Mille et une nuits in 1806. Some of Chavis's material continued to circulate in later translations of the Nights, including Edouard Gauttier's of 1822–23. Most of its extra stories were also translated into English in the sixth supplemental volume to Richard Burton's translation of the Nights (as nos 409-17).

=== Continuation des Mille et Une Nuits ===
The Switzerland-based publisher Paul Barde, who was printing a massive, multi-volume anthology of fairy-tales entitled Cabinet des Fées, seems to have contacted Chavis to see if he had access for further Nights material. Chavis said he did, and Barde put Chavis into collaboration with the celebrated fairy-tale writer Jacques Cazotte. Surviving correspondence suggests an awkward collaboration, in which Chavis promised to deliver material and sought money but did not entirely satisfy Cazotte and Barde. It seems that Chavis made French translations of the manuscript he had produced, along with other stories (whether in note form or complete), sent this material to Cazotte, and Cazotte variously edited or rewrote it, adding further tales of his own invention (most notably one called Maugraby). The resulting text was then edited further by Barde, and published in Geneva in 1788–89, independently as Continuation des Mille et Une Nuits and, in the Cabinet des Fées, as Suites des Mille et Une Nuits. The Continuation was well received and was translated three times into English.
