= Story of Ahikar =

Aramaic story from the fifth century BCE

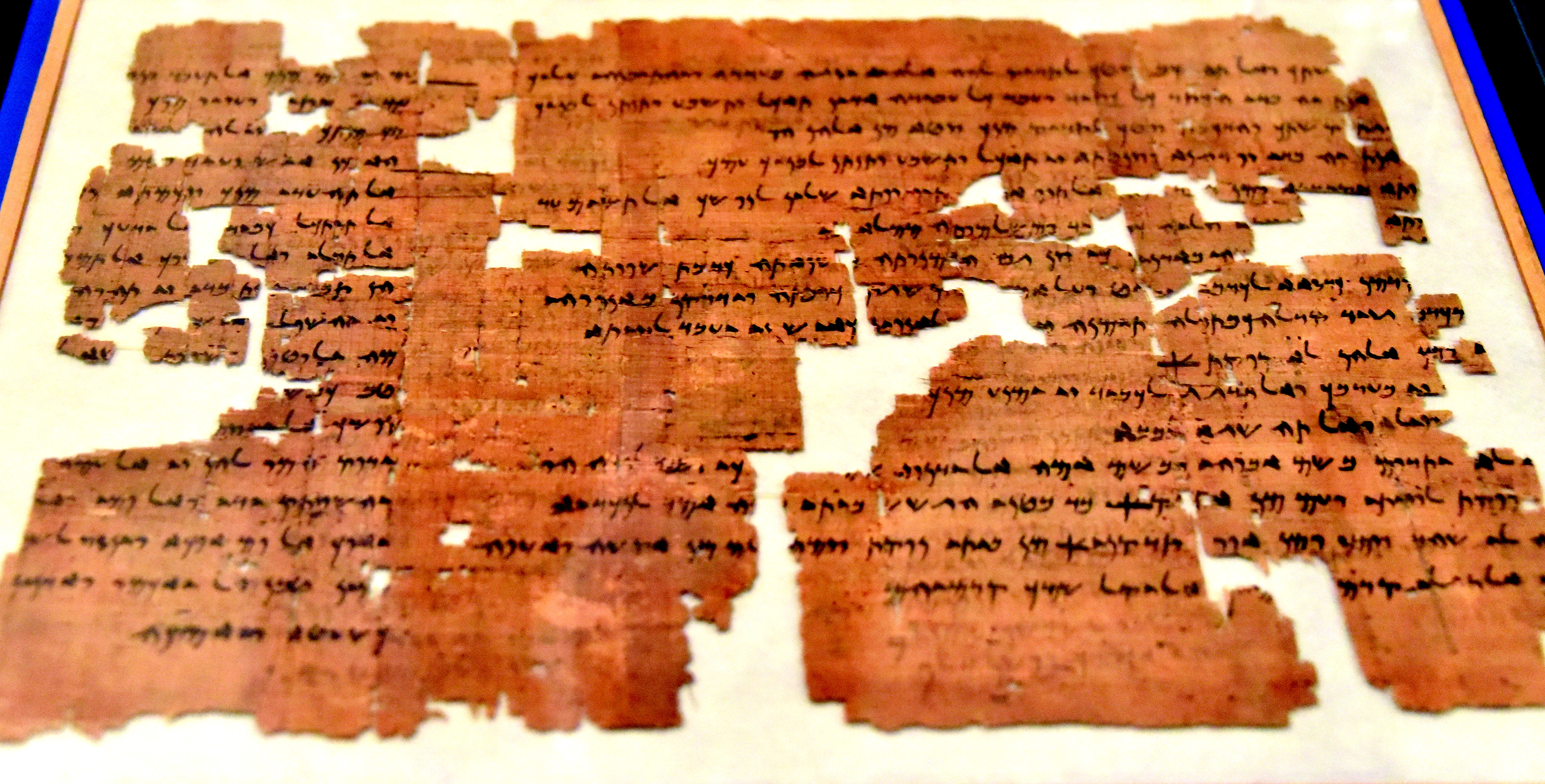
Papyrus narrating the story of the wise chancellor Ahiqar. Aramaic script. 5th century BCE. From Elephantine, Egypt. Neues Museum, Berline

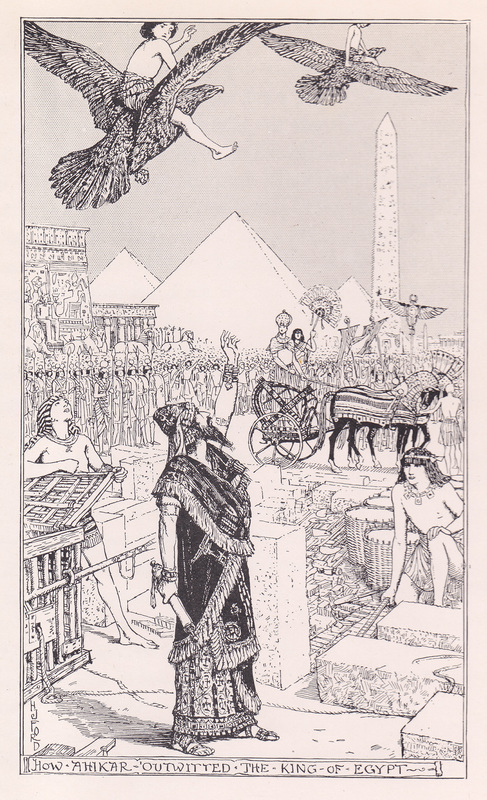
How Ahikar Outwitted the King of Egypt (Henry Justice Ford)

The Story of Aḥiqar, also known as the Words of Aḥiqar, is a story first attested to in Imperial Aramaic from the fifth century BCE on papyri from Elephantine, Egypt, that circulated widely in the Middle and the Near East. It has been characterised as "one of the earliest 'international books' of world literature".

The principal character, Aḥiqar, might have been a chancellor to the Assyrian Kings Sennacherib and Esarhaddon. Only a Late Babylonian cuneiform tablet from Uruk (Warka) mentions an Aramaic name Aḫu’aqār. His name is written in Imperial Aramaic אחיקר and in Syriac ܐܚܝܩܪ and is transliterated as Aḥiqar, Arabic حَيْقَار (Ḥayqār), Greek Achiacharos, and Slavonic Akyrios, with variants on that theme such as Armenian Խիկար (Xikar) and Ottoman Turkish Khikar, a sage known in the ancient Near East for his outstanding wisdom.

It is known as TAD C1.1, and catalogued as Berlin Papyrus 13446A-H, K-L (Berlin Papyrus Collection) and Pap. No. 3465 = J. 43502 (Egyptian Museum of Cairo).

== Narrative ==
In the story, Ahikar is chancellor to the Assyrian kings Sennacherib and Esarhaddon. Having no child of his own, he adopted his nephew Nadab/Nadin, and raised him to be his successor. Nadab/Nadin ungratefully plotted to have his elderly uncle murdered, and persuades Esarhaddon that Ahikar has committed treason. Esarhaddon orders Ahikar be executed in response, and so Ahikar is arrested and imprisoned to await punishment. However, Ahikar reminds the executioner that the executioner had been saved by Ahikar from a similar fate under Sennacherib, and so instead the executioner kills a different prisoner, and pretends to Esarhaddon that it is the body of Ahikar.

The remainder of the early texts do not survive beyond this point, but it is thought probable that the original ending had Nadab/Nadin being executed while Ahikar is rehabilitated. Later texts portray Ahikar coming out of hiding to counsel the Egyptian king on behalf of Esarhaddon, and then returning in triumph to Esarhaddon. In the later texts, after Ahikar's return, he meets Nadab/Nadin and is very angry with him, and Nadab/Nadin then dies.

== Origins and development ==
At Uruk (Warka), a Late Babylonian cuneiform text from the second century BCE was found that mentions the Aramaic name A-ḫu-u’-qa-a-ri of an ummānu "sage" Aba-enlil-dari (probably to be read in Babylonian as Mannu-kīma-enlil-ḫātin) under Esarhaddon (seventh century BCE). There are also references to one or more people named Ahī-yaqar in cuneiform texts from the time of Sennacherib and Esarhaddon, although the identification of this person (or people) with the sage Ahiqar is uncertain. The literary text of the sage Aḥiqar might have been composed in Aramaic in Mesopotamia, probably around the late seventh or early sixth century BCE. The first attestation are several papyrus fragments of the fifth century BCE from the ruins of the Jewish military colony on the island Elephantine, Egypt. The narrative of the initial part of the story is expanded greatly by the presence of a large number of wise sayings and proverbs that Ahiqar is portrayed as speaking to his nephew. It is suspected by most scholars that these sayings and proverbs were originally a separate document, as they do not mention Ahiqar. Some of the sayings are similar to parts of the Biblical Book of Proverbs, others to the deuterocanonical Wisdom of Sirach, and others still to Babylonian and Persian proverbs. The collection of sayings is in essence a selection from those common in the Middle East at the time.

In the Koine Greek Book of Tobit (second or third century BCE), Tobit has a nephew named Achiacharon (Αχιχαρον, or Achiacharos Αχιαχαρος; Tobit 1:21) in royal service at Nineveh. It was pointed out by scholar George Hoffmann in 1880 that Ahikar and the Achiacharos of Tobit are identical. In the summary of W. C. Kaiser, Jr.:

'chief cupbearer, keeper of the signet, and in charge of administrations of the accounts under King Sennacherib of Assyria', and later under Esarhaddon (Tob. 1:21–22 NRSV). When Tobit lost his sight, Ahikar [Αχιαχαρος] took care of him for two years. Ahikar and his nephew Nadab [Νασβας] were present at the wedding of Tobit's son, Tobias (2:10; 11:18). Shortly before his death, Tobit said to his son: 'See, my son, what Nadab did to Ahikar who had reared him. Was he not, while still alive, brought down into the earth? For God repaid him to his face for this shameful treatment. Ahikar came out into the light, but Nadab went into the eternal darkness, because he tried to kill Ahikar. Because he gave alms, Ahikar escaped the fatal trap that Nadab had set for him, but Nadab fell into it himself, and was destroyed' (14:10 NRSV).

The Codex Sinaiticus Greek Text, which the New Revised Standard Version follows, has "Nadab." The Greek Text of the Codices Vaticanus and Alexandrinus calls this person "Aman".

It has been contended that there are traces of the legend even in the New Testament, and there is a striking similarity between it and the Life of Aesop by Maximus Planudes (ch. xxiii–xxxii). An eastern sage named "Achaicarus" is mentioned by Strabo. It would seem, therefore, that the legend was undoubtedly Near Eastern in origin, though the relationship of the various versions can scarcely be recovered. Elements of the Ahikar story have also been found in Demotic Egyptian. British classicist Stephanie West has argued that the story of Croesus in Herodotus as an adviser to Cyrus the Great is another manifestation of the Ahiqar story. A full Greek translation of the Story of Ahikar was made at some point, but it does not survive. It was, however, the basis for translations into Old Slavonic and Romanian.

There are five surviving Classical Syriac recensions of the Story and evidence for an older Syriac version as well. The latter was translated into Armenian and Arabic. Some Ahiqar elements were transferred to Luqman in the Arabic adaptations. The Georgian and Old Turkic translations are based on the Armenian, while the Ethiopic is derived from the Arabic, influence of which is also apparent in Suret versions now.

An Arabic version, known as Haykar the Sage, was added to the Arabian Nights by Chavis and Cazotte in their 1788-1789 Continuation of the Arabian Nights. The tale was translated again and added in Caussin de Perceval and Richard Burton's versions of the Nights.

== Legacy ==
In modern folkloristics, the story of Achikar gives its name, in the international Aarne-Thompson-Uther Index, to tale type ATU 922A, Achikar (or Achiqar).

== Editions and translations ==
- Eduard Sachau, Aramäische Papyrus und Ostraca aus einer jüdischen Militärkolonie (Leipzig: J. C. Hindrichs, 1911), pp. 147–182, pls. 40–50.
- The Story of Aḥiḳar from the Aramaic, Syriac, Arabic, Armenian, Ethiopic, Old Turkish, Greek and Slavonic Versions, ed. by F. C. Conybeare, J. Rendel Harrisl Agnes Smith Lewis, 2nd edition (Cambridge: Cambridge University Press, 1913) archive.org
- A. Cowley, "The Story of Aḥiḳar," in Aramaic Papyri of the Fifth Century (Oxford: Clarendon Press, 1923), pp. 204–248.
- Platt, Rutherford H. Jr., ed. (1926). The forgotten books of Eden. New York, NY: Alpha House. pp. 198–219. (audiobook)
- The Say of Haykar the Sage translated by Richard Francis Burton
- James M. Lindenberger, The Aramaic Proverbs of Ahiqar (Baltimore: Johns Hopkins University Press, 1983).
- James M. Lindenberger, Ahiqar. A New Translation and Introduction, in James H. Charlesworth (1985), The Old Testament Pseudoepigrapha, Garden City, NY: Doubleday & Company Inc., Volume 2, ISBN 0-385-09630-5 (Vol. 1), ISBN 0-385-18813-7 (Vol. 2), pp. 494–507.
- Ingo Kottsieper, Die Sprache der Aḥiqarsprüche (= Beihefte zur Zeitschrift für die altestamentliche Wissenschaft, 194) (Berlin: De Gruyter, 1990). ISBN 3-11-012331-2
- Bezalel Porten, Ada Yardeni, "C1.1 Aḥiqar," in Textbook of Aramaic Documents from Ancient Egypt, vol. 3 (Jerusalem, 1993), pp. 23–57. ISBN 965-350-014-7

== Literature ==
- Bledsoe, Seth. The Wisdom of the Aramaic Book of Ahiqar, (Leiden: Brill, 2021) doi: https://doi.org/10.1163/9789004473126
- Pierre Grelot, "Histoire et sagesse de ’Aḥîqar l’assyrien," in Documents araméens d’Égypte (Paris: L’édition du Cerf, 1972), pp. 427–452.
- Ricardo Contini, Christiano Grottanelli, Il saggio Ahiqar (Brescia: Peidaeia Editrice, 2006). ISBN 88-394-0709-X
- Karlheinz Kessler, "Das wahre Ende Babylons – Die Tradition der Aramäer, Mandaäer, Juden und Manichäer," in Joachim Marzahn, Günther Schauerte (edd.), Babylon – Wahrheit (Munich, 2008), p. 483, fig. 341 (photo).ISBN 978-3-7774-4295-2
