= Galland Manuscript =

Earliest extensive manuscript of the Thousand and One Nights

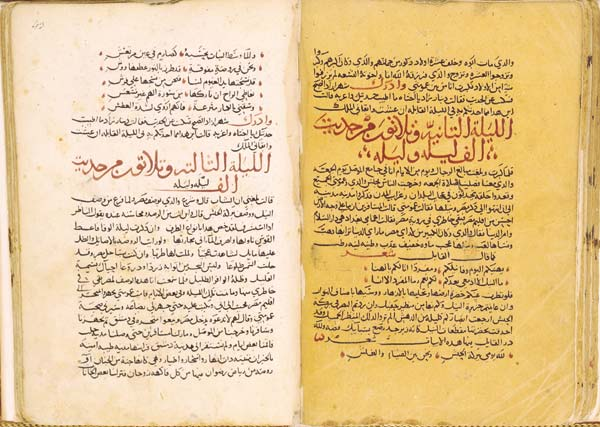
Two folios of the Galland Manuscript

The three-volume Galland Manuscript (Paris, Bibliothèque Nationale, MSS arabes 3609, 3610 and 3611), sometimes also referred to as the Syrian Manuscript, is the earliest extensive manuscript of the One Thousand and One Nights (the earliest witness is a ninth-century fragment of a mere sixteen lines; another two are fragments of the tale Sul and Shumul). This was the main manuscript used by Antoine Galland in his translation of the One Thousand and One Nights from the Arabic to the French.

== Description ==
Its text extends to 282 nights, breaking off in the middle of the Tale of Qamar al-Zamān and Budūr. The age of the manuscript is not known definitively. Muhsin Mahdi, the manuscript's modern editor, suggested that it was written sometime around AD 1291, while Heinz Grotzfeld dated it to after AD 1450 and before 1701 when Galland purchased the manuscript.

== Manuscript copies ==
A direct copy of the Galland Manuscript from 1592/1593 CE is preserved in the Vatican Library as the second part of the two-volume Cod. Vat. Ar. 782, and has been digitised. The Galland Manuscript was also the source for much of the Chavis Manuscript, an attempt in the 1780s by Denis Chavis to forge a more Arabic complete manuscript of the Nights, which was itself in turn influential on the development of editions and translations of the Nights.

== Editions and translations ==
The Galland Manuscript provided the kernel of Antoine Galland's seminal French rendering of the Nights, Les mille et une nuits, contes arabes traduits en français, published in 1704–17. Modern scholarly handlings are:

- The Thousand and One Nights (Alf layla wa-layla), from the Earliest Known Sources, ed. by Muhsin Mahdi, 3 vols (Leiden: Brill, 1984-1994), ISBN 9004074287
- The Arabian Nights, trans. by Husain Haddawy (New York: Norton, 1990) [repr. along with selections from The Arabian Nights II: Sindbad and Other Popular Stories, trans. by Husain Haddawy (New York: Norton, 1995) as The Arabian Nights: The Husain Haddawy Translation Based on the Text Edited by Muhsin Mahdi, Contexts, Criticism, ed. by Daniel Heller-Roazen (New York: Norton, 2010)]
- Tausendundeine Nacht [One Thousand and One Nights] (in German). Translated by Ott, Claudia. Munich: C. H. Beck. 2004. ISBN 9783406722905.

== See also ==
- Hanna Diyab
