= Paul Lucas (traveller) =

French merchant (1664–1737)

Paul Lucas (31 August 1664, in Quevilly, Province of Normandy – 12 May 1737, in Madrid) was a French merchant, naturalist, physician and antiquarian to King Louis XIV.

== Life ==
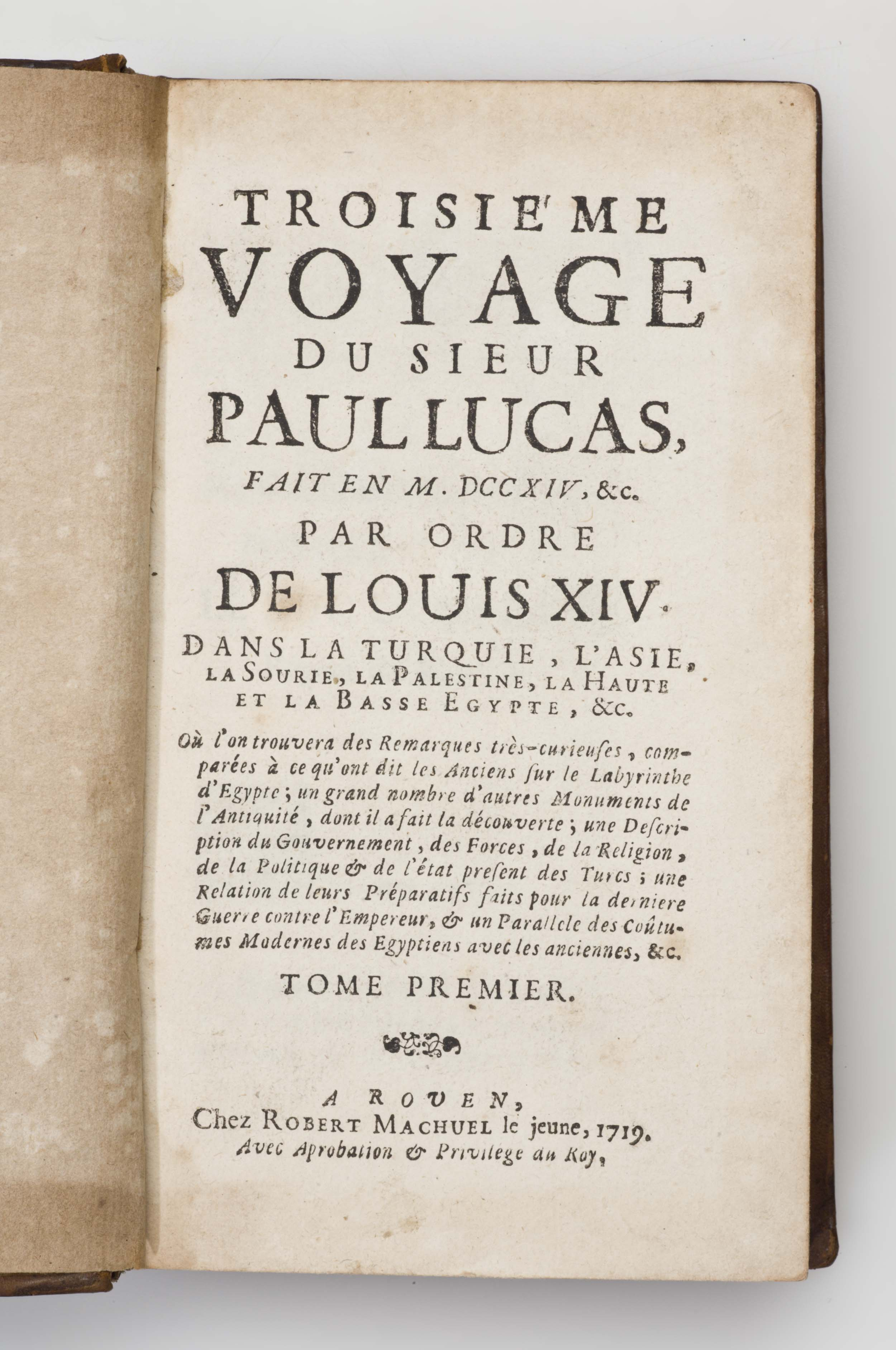
Title page of 1719 printing of Troisième voyage du sieur Paul Lucas

Lucas was the son of Centurion Lucas, a well known book printer and publisher in Rouen, and Judith Mauclerc.

In 1688, he served with the Venetians at the Siege of Negroponte. In 1696 he returned to France with a large collection of medals and other antiquities which were purchased for the French Royal Cabinet. This brought him to the attention of the court and he then began a series of three voyages to the East: he travelled extensively in Greece, Turkey, the Levant and Egypt, in three major voyages (1699–1703, 1704–1708 and 1714–1717).

Lucas is one of the earliest sources of information from Upper Egypt, visiting among other places Thebes (though he does not identify it) and the Nile up to the cataracts.

A panegyrical portrayal of Lucas is also afforded in the Arabic autobiography of Hanna Diyab, a Syrian whom Lucas employed as an interpreter, assistant, and servant from around 1707-10. Diyab viewed Lucas as having miraculous medical powers. Lucas's own writings never mention Diyab, however.

== Works ==
- Voyage du Sieur paul Lucas au Levant. On y trouvera entr'autre une description de la haute Egypte, suivant le cours du Nil, depuis le Caire jusques aux Cataractes, avec une Carte exacte de ce fleuve, que personne n'avoit donné. Paris, Guillaume Vandive, 1704; 2 vol.
- Voyage du Sieur paul Lucas, fait par ordre du Roi dans la Grèce, l'Asie Mineure, la Macédoine et l'Afrique. Nicolas Simart, Paris, 1712; 2 vol.
- Voyage du Sieur Paul Lucas, fait en 1714... dans la Turquie, l'Asie, la Syrie, la Palestine, la Haute et la Basse-Égypte, etc..., Rouen, R. Machuel le jeune, 1719; 3 vol.

== Gallery ==
Selected illustrations from Paul Lucas' books:

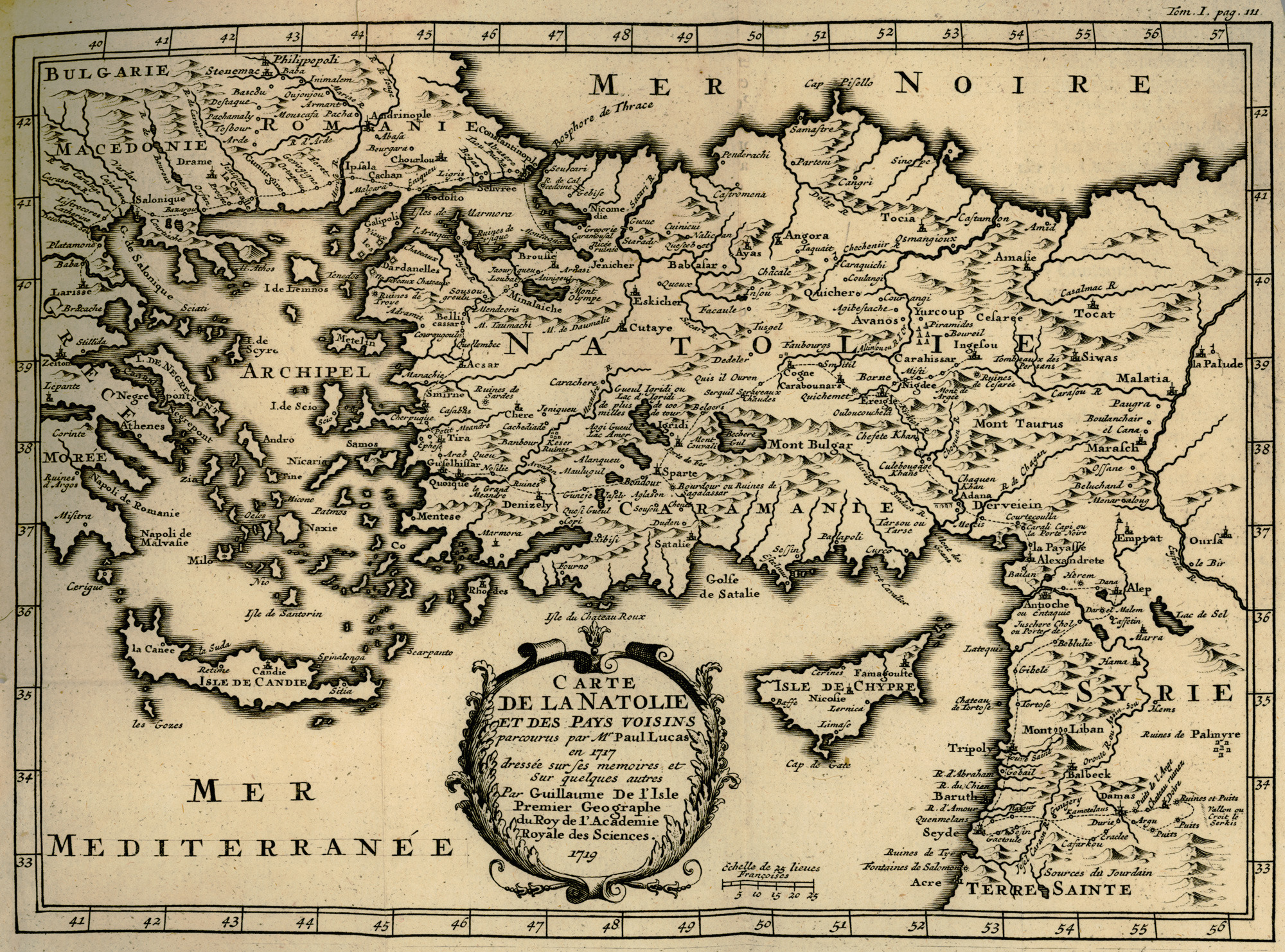
Map of East Mediterranean locations visited by Lucas

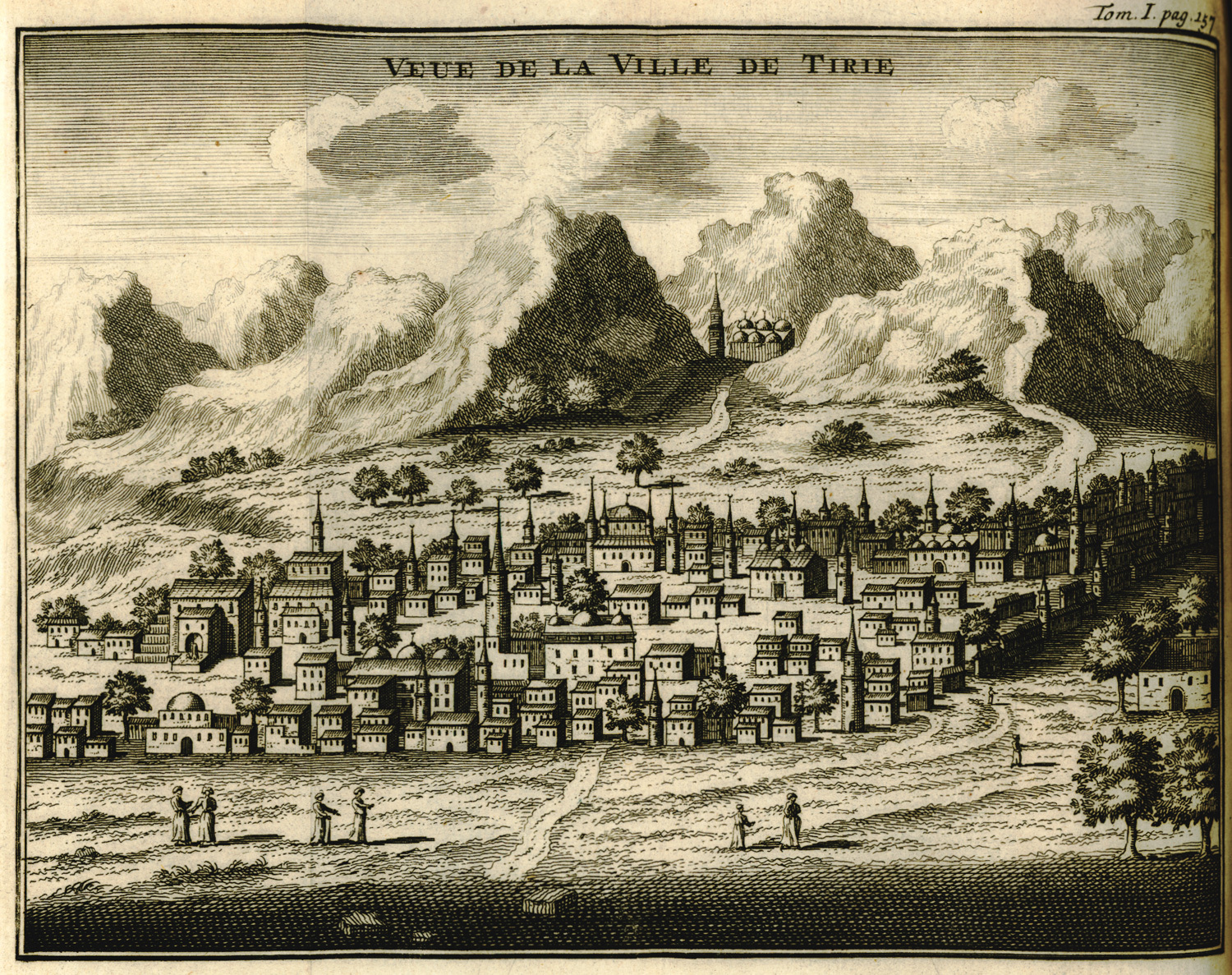
The ancient city of Tyrrha

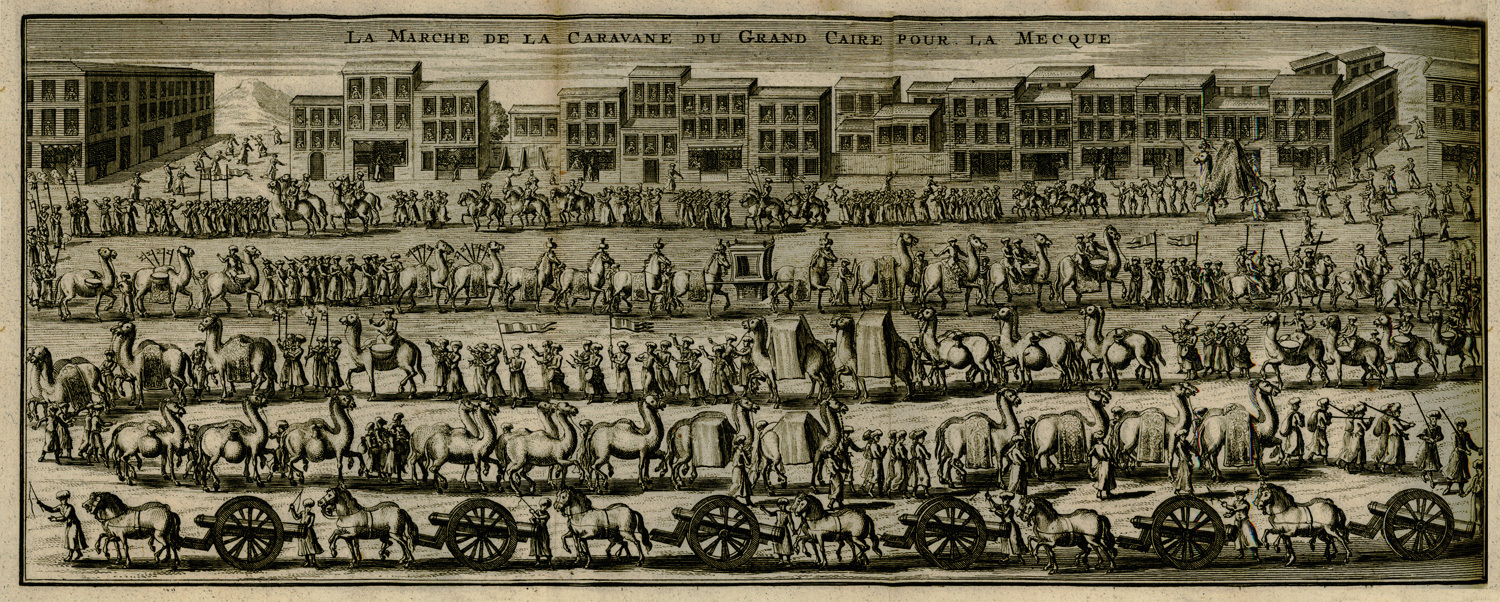
The pilgrim caravan departing from Cairo for Mecca

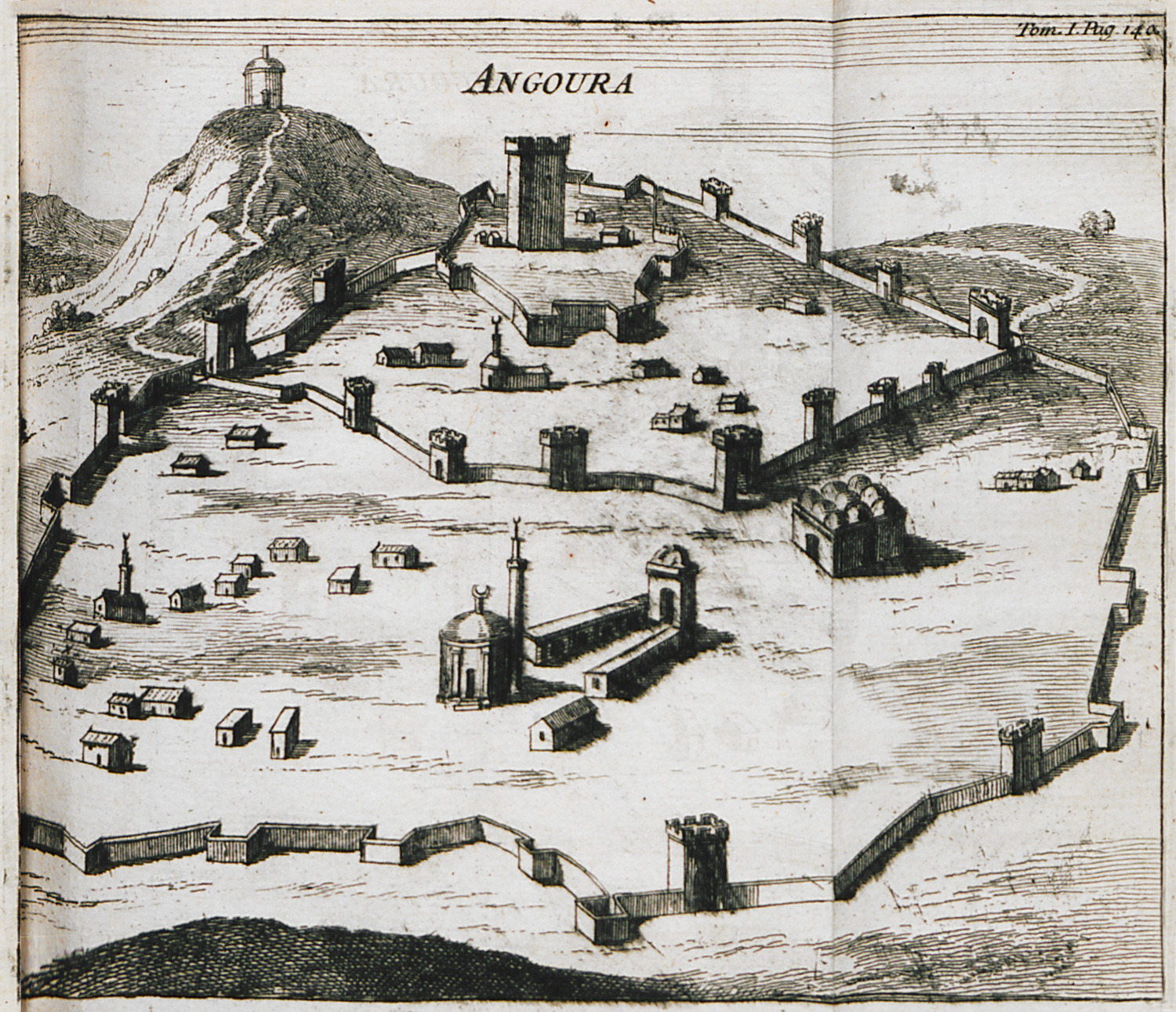
View of Ankara
