= Hanna Diyab =

Syrian writer and storyteller (c. 1688 – after 1763)

- Born: Antun Yusuf Hanna Diyab c. 1688; Aleppo, Aleppo Eyalet, Ottoman Empire
- Died: c. 1765 (aged c. 77)
- Other names: Youhanna Diab, Hanna Diab
- Occupations: Writer; storyteller; cloth merchant
- Notable work: The Book of Travels

Antun Yusuf Hanna Diyab (Arabic: اَنْطون يوسُف حَنّا دِياب, romanized: Anṭūn Yūsuf Ḥannā Diyāb; c. 1688 - c. 1765) was a Syrian Maronite writer and storyteller. He originated the best-known versions of the tales of Aladdin and Ali Baba and the Forty Thieves which have been added to the One Thousand and One Nights since French orientalist Antoine Galland translated and included them, after which they soon became popular across the West.

Diyab was long known only from brief mentions in the diary of Antoine Galland, but the translation and publication of his Arabic manuscript autobiography in 2015 expanded knowledge about his life. Reassessments of Diyab's contribution to Les mille et une nuits, Galland's widely influential version of the oriental stories of One Thousand and One Nights, have argued that Diyab is central to the literary history of such famous tales as Aladdin and Ali Baba and the Forty Thieves, despite Diyab only having been named as "Hanna from Aleppo" in Galland's diary.

Literary scholars Ruth Bottigheimer and Paulo Lemos Horta have argued that Diyab should be understood as the original author of some of the stories published by Galland, and even that several of these stories, including Aladdin, were partly inspired by Diyab's own life, as there are parallels with his autobiography.

Further, scholars have argued that the travelogue provides an oriental outsider's view of Paris in 1708–1709, as well as extensive glimpses into other aspects of Diyab's world. Though it may not always reflect Diyab's eye-witness experiences, his autobiography also provides information about the places and cultures he encountered, and his identity as an accomplished oriental raconteur.

== Life ==
=== Sources ===
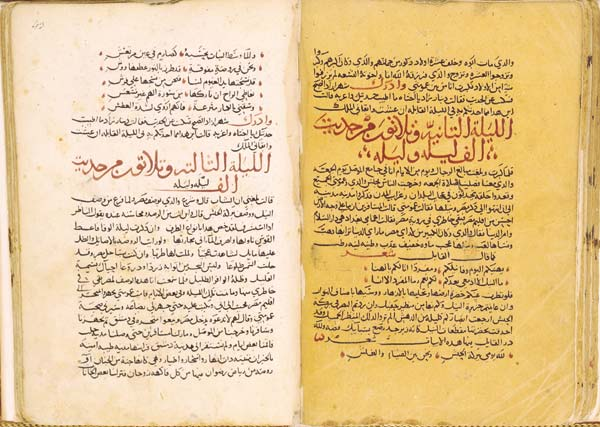
Two pages from the Galland Manuscript containing stories that later appeared in Galland's The Thousand and One Nights. Written sometime between 1450 and 1593

Most of what is known about Diyab's life comes from his autobiography, which he composed in 1763, around the age of 75. It survives as Vatican Library MS Sbath 254, although the first few pages are missing, and its lively narrative has been described as picaresque, and a valuable example of the colloquial, 18th-century Middle Arabic of Aleppo, influenced by Aramaic and Turkish.

Other details of Diyab's life are known from the diaries of Antoine Galland and Paul Lucas, who had hired Diyab to accompany him on his journey from Aleppo to Paris, Diyab's marriage contract of 1717, and an Aleppo census of 1740.

=== Early life in Syria and journey to France ===
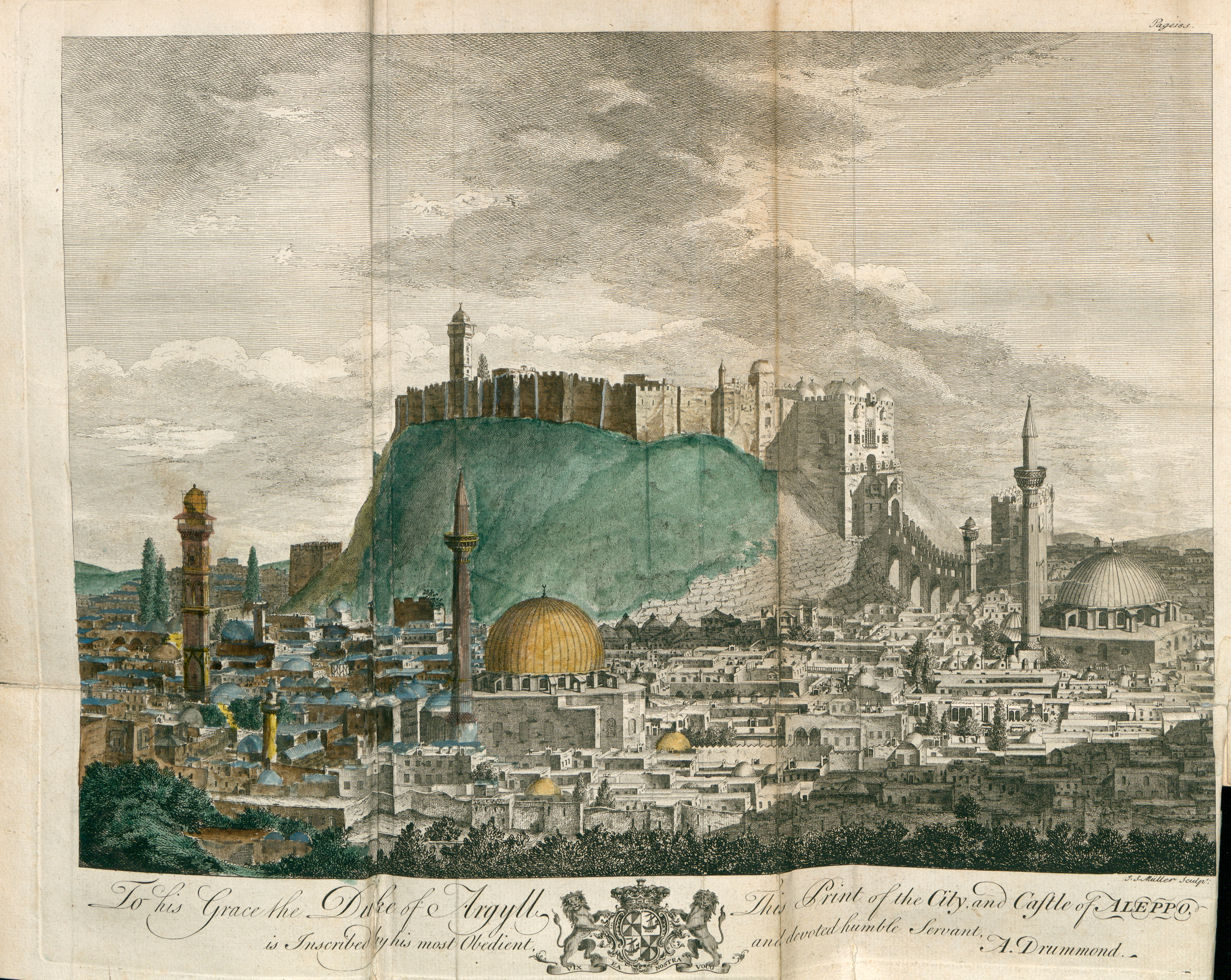
Historical view of Aleppo in the 18th century

Diyab was born to a Maronite Christian family in Aleppo, Ottoman Syria, around 1688 and lost his father while still in his teens. Working as a young man for French merchants in Syria, Diyab learned French and Italian; according to Galland, he also had a knowledge of Provençal and Turkish; it is also possible that, as a Maronite, he knew some Syriac.

Diyab briefly joined a Maronite monastery on Mount Lebanon as a novice, but decided not to become a monk. As he proceeded home, around the beginning of 1707, he met the Frenchman Paul Lucas, who was on an expedition in search of antiquities on behalf of Louis XIV of France. Lucas invited Diyab to return with him to France, working as a servant, assistant and interpreter, suggesting that he might find work at the Royal Library in Paris.

Leaving Aleppo in February 1707, they visited Egypt, Tripoli, Tunisia, Corsica, Livorno, Genoa, and Marseille before reaching Paris early in 1708, where Diyab's stay culminated with his reception at Versailles by king Louis XIV. Diyab was received with some excitement in Paris, partly because Lucas had him wear national dress and carry a cage containing two jerboas from Tunis. After around two years, Diyab tired of seeking advancement and returned to Aleppo in 1710.

=== Telling stories to Galland ===
While in Paris, Diyab first met the Orientalist Antoine Galland on Sunday, March 17, 1709. Galland's diary contains extended summaries of stories told by Diyab on March 25. Galland recorded more stories, apparently from oral telling, throughout May and into June that year. He went on to include these works as a continuation of his French translation of an incomplete Arabic manuscript of the Thousand and One Nights, and they include some of the stories that became the most popular and closely associated with the Thousand and One Nights in later world literature. It seems likely that Diyab told these stories in French. Diyab's autobiography represents Lucas as having miraculous medical capabilities, but Diyab enjoyed less acknowledgement from his French associates: he received no credit in Galland's published work, nor any mention in the writing of Lucas. According to the autobiography, Galland was afraid that Diyab would gain a position at the Royal Library that he desired for himself and Galland conspired to send Diyab back to Aleppo.

=== Later life ===
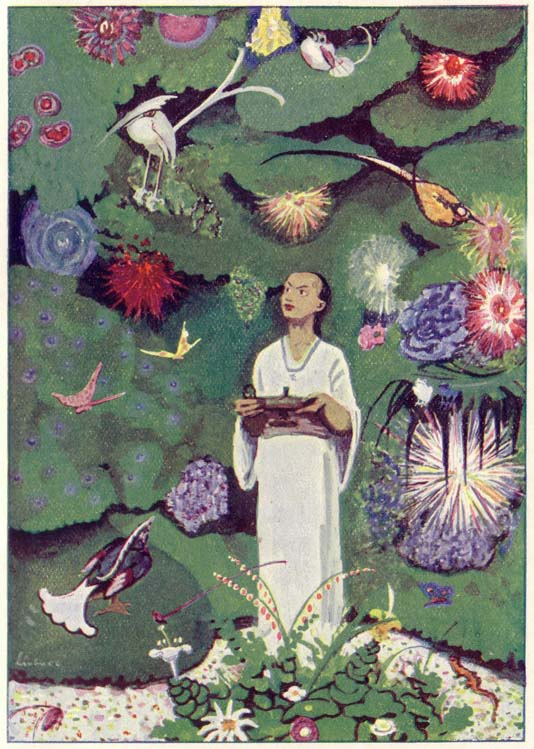
Title page of Aladdin and the Wonderful Lamp, by Max Liebert, 1912

After his return to Aleppo in 1710, Diyab became a successful cloth merchant with the help of his brother Abdallah. He married in 1717 and had extensive progeny. By 1740, he lived in one of the community's largest households, alongside his mother and two elder brothers.

As well as writing his autobiography in 1763, Diyab seems to have copied (or at least owned) another manuscript, Vatican Library, Sbath 108, containing Arabic translations of the Sefaretname travelogue by Ilyas Al-Mawsili concerning his own travels, Ilyas's history of the Spanish conquest of the Americas, and an account by the Ottoman ambassador Yirmisekizzade Mehmed Said Pasha of his 1719 embassy to France.

== Reception ==
In his postscript to the German edition of Diyab's travelogue, the French historian Bernard Heyberger calls it "a unique document thanks to its narrative qualities, rich observations, and the familiarity he establishes with the reader through the description of his impressions and feelings." Further, he emphasizes Diyab's personal style, which is characterized by the lively speech of the oriental narrator typical for the popular gatherings in coffeehouses and gardens of Aleppo. With reference to Diyab's humble social origins, his self-confidence and his portrayal of European people and events, the travelogue is, according to Heyberger, an early example in Syrian literature of the perspective "from the bottom up, [from] the point of view of the subaltern". Due to his early acquaintance with European merchants and their languages, Diyab did not feel that he belonged to a completely different, oriental culture. Rather, he described numerous experiences as a self-assured middleman who acted in the service of respectable European travelers and scientists.

As tabulated by Ulrich Marzolph, the tales told by Diyab to Galland, most of which appeared in Galland's Les mille et une nuits, were:

Date (in 1709)	Title	ATU tale type	Number in Galland	Number in Chauvin
March 25	'several very beautiful Arabic tales'			
May 5	Aladdin	561	Vol. 9.2	No. 19
May 6	Qamar al-dīn and Badr al-Budūr	888		
May 10	The Caliph’s Night Adventures	Frame tale, containing the following three	Vol. 10.1	No. 209
May 10	Blind Man Bābā ʿAbdallāh	836F*	Vol. 10.2	No. 725
May 10	Sīdī Nuʿmān	449	Vol. 10.3	No. 371
May 10	Alī al-Zaybaq	Short mention only		
May 13	The Ebony Horse	575	Vol. 11.3	No. 130
May 15	The Golden City	306		
May 22	Prince Ahmed and the Fairy Perī-Bānū	653A+465	Vol. 12.1	No. 286
May 23	The Sultan of Samarkand and His Three Sons	550+301		No. 181
May 25	The Two Sisters Who Envied Their Cadette	707	Vol. 12.2	No. 375
May 27	The Ten Viziers	875D*		No. 48
May 27	Ali Baba	676+954	Vol. 11.1	No. 241
May 29	Khawājā Hasan al-Habbāl	945A*	Vol. 10.4	No. 202
May 29	Alī Khawājā and the Merchant of Bagdad	1617	Vol. 11.2	No. 26
May 31	The Purse, the Dervish’s Horn, the Figs, and the Horns	566		
June 2	Hasan the Seller of Herbal Tea			

Though usually corresponding to widespread international tale-types and both presented by Galland and often still imagined today as traditional Arabic folk-tales, it is likely that Diyab's repertoire and narrative style reflects his education and literary reading, multilingualism, and extensive travels within and beyond the Arab world.

== Works ==
- Dyâb, Hanna, D’Alep à Paris: Les pérégrinations d’un jeune syrien au temps de Louis XIV, ed. and trans. by Paule Fahmé-Thiéry, Bernard Heyberger, and Jérôme Lentin (Paris: Sindbad, 2015) [autobiography in French translation].
- Dyâb, Hanna, Min Halab ila Baris: Rihla ila Bilat Luwis Arrabi' 'Ashir, ed. by Mamede Jarouche and Safa A.-C. Jubran (Beirut/Baghdad: Al-Jamal, 2017) [critical edition in Arabic]
- Diyāb, Ḥannā, The Book of Travels, ed. by Johannes Stephan, trans. by Elias Muhanna, 2 vols (New York: New York University Press, 2021), ISBN 9781479810949
- Ulrich Marzolph and Anne E. Duggan, 'Ḥannā Diyāb's Tales', Marvels & Tales 32.1 (2018), 133–154 (part I); 32.2 (2018) 435–456 (part II) [English translations of Galland's summaries of Diyab's tales].
- 'Hanna Diyab Tales, as Transcribed by Galland in his Diary', trans. by Ulrich Marzolph and Anne E. Duggan, ed. by Paulo Lemos Horta, in The Annotated Arabian Nights: Tales from 1001 Nights, trans. by Yasmine Seale, ed. by Paulo Lemos Horta (New York: Liveright, 2021), pp. 523–96. ISBN 9781631493638.
- Catalogue record and digitisation of Vatican Library, Sbath.108 [a manuscript of which Diyāb seems to have been the scribe].
- Catalogue record and digitisation of Vatican Library, Sbath.254 [Diyāb's manuscript autobiography in digital facsimile].
