= Antoine Galland =

French orientalist, numismatist and translator (1646–1715)

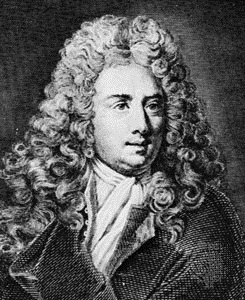
- Born: 4 April 1646; Rollot, Picardy, Kingdom of France
- Died: 17 February 1715 (aged 68); Caen, Normandy, Kingdom of France
- Occupations: Orientalist; archaeologist
- Years active: 1670–1715
- Known for: First European translator of One Thousand and One Nights
- Notable work: Les mille et une nuits

Antoine Galland (French: [ɑ̃twan ɡalɑ̃]; 4 April 1646 – 17 February 1715) was a French orientalist and archaeologist, most famous as the first European translator of One Thousand and One Nights, which he called Les mille et une nuits. His version of the tales appeared in twelve volumes between 1704 and 1717 and exerted a significant influence on subsequent European literature and attitudes to the Islamic world. Jorge Luis Borges has suggested that Romanticism began when his translation was first read.

== Life and work ==
Galland was born at Rollot in Picardy (now in the department of Somme). After completing school at Noyon, he studied Greek and Latin in Paris, where he also acquired some Arabic. In 1670 he was attached to the French embassy at Istanbul because of his excellent knowledge of Greek and, in 1673, he travelled in Syria and the Levant, where he copied a great number of inscriptions, sketched and—in some cases—removed historical monuments.

After a brief visit to France, where his collection of ancient coins attracted some attention, Galland returned to the Levant in 1677. In 1679 he undertook a third voyage, being commissioned by the French East India Company to collect for the cabinet of Colbert. On the expiration of this commission, he was instructed by the government to continue his research, and had the title of antiquary to the king (Louis XIV) conferred upon him. During his prolonged residences abroad, he acquired a thorough knowledge of the Arabic, Turkish, and Persian languages and literatures, which, on his final return to France, enabled him to render valuable assistance to Melchisédech Thévenot, the keeper of the royal library, and to Barthélemy d'Herbelot de Molainville.

When d'Herbelot died in 1695, Galland continued his Bibliothèque orientale ('Oriental Library'), a huge compendium of information about Islamic culture, and principally a translation of the great Arabic encyclopedia Kashf al-Zunun by the celebrated Ottoman scholar Kâtip Çelebi. It was finally published in 1697 and was a major contribution to European knowledge about the Middle East, influencing writers such as William Beckford (in his oriental tale Vathek).

After the deaths of Thévenot and d'Herbelot, Galland lived for some time at Caen under the roof of Nicolas Foucault, the intendant of Caen, himself no mean archaeologist. There he began, in 1704, the publication of Les mille et Une Nuits, which excited immense interest during the time of its appearance and is still the standard French translation. In 1709 he was appointed to the chair of Arabic in the Collège de France. He continued to discharge the duties of this post until his death in 1715.

Besides a number of archaeological works, especially in the department of numismatics, Galland published in 1694 a compilation from the Arabic, Persian, and Turkish, entitled Paroles remarquables, bons mots et maximes des orientaux, and in 1699 a translation from an Arabic manuscript, De l'origine et du progrès du café. The former of these works appeared in an English translation in 1795. His Contes et fables indiennes de Bidpai et de Lokrnan was published posthumously in 1724. Among his numerous manuscripts are a translation of the Qur'an and a Histoire générale des empereurs Turcs. His journal was published by Charles Schefer in 1881.

=== Translation of The Thousand and One Nights ===
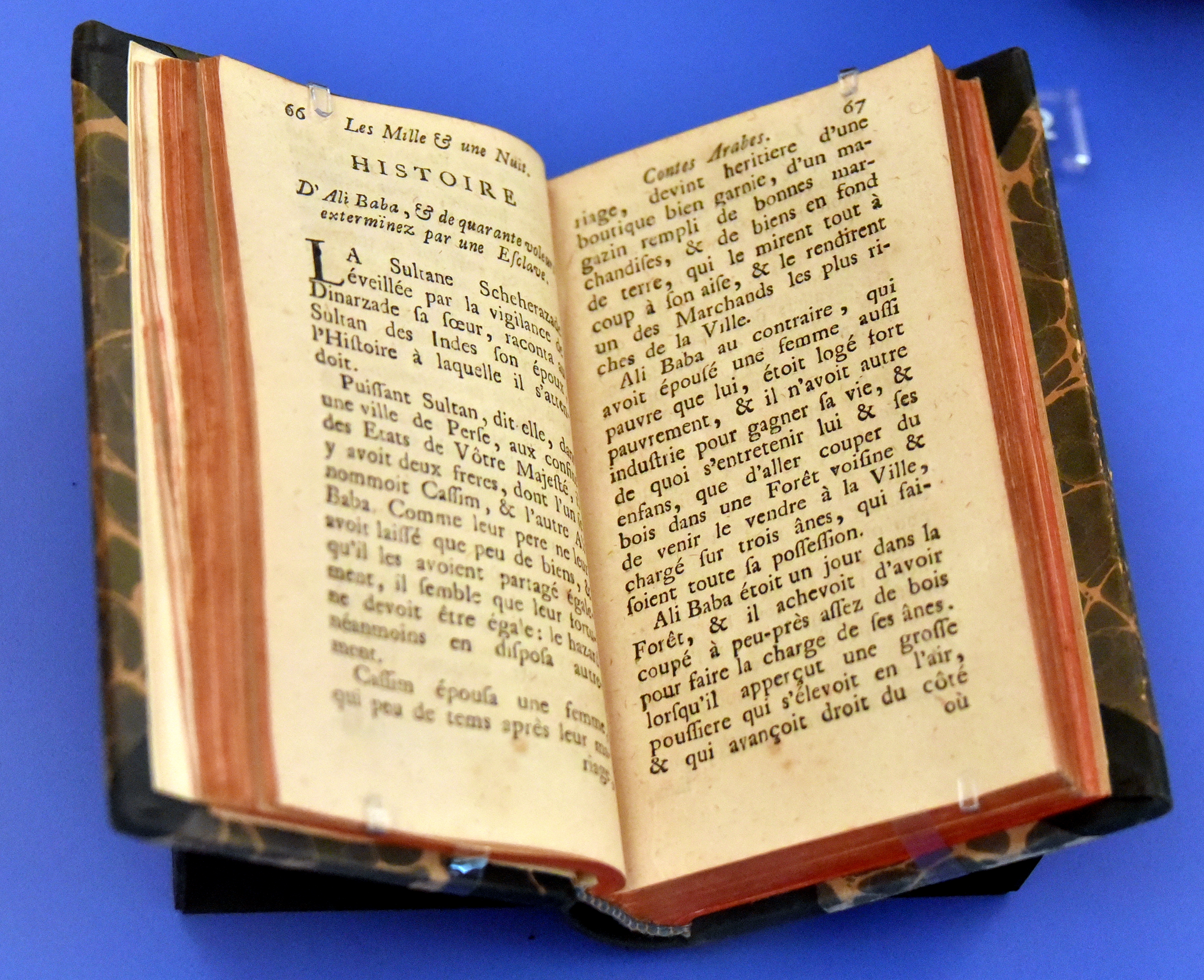
The first European edition of Arabian Nights, Les Mille et une Nuits, by Antoine Galland, 1730 AD, Paris

Galland had come across a manuscript of The Tale of Sindbad the Sailor in Constantinople during the 1690s and, in 1701, he published his translation of it into French. Its success encouraged him to embark on a translation of a fourteenth- or fifteenth-century Syrian manuscript (now known as the Galland Manuscript) of The Thousand and One Nights. The first two volumes of this work, under the title Mille et Une Nuits, appeared in 1704. The twelfth and final volume was published posthumously in 1717.

He translated the first part of his work solely from the Syrian manuscript. In 1709 he was introduced to a Maronite Christian from Aleppo, Hanna Diyab, who recounted in French fourteen more stories to Galland from memory. He chose to include seven of these tales in his version of the Nights.

Mystery surrounds the origins of some of the most famous tales. For instance, there are no Arabic versions of Aladdin and Ali Baba (the so-called "orphan tales") which pre-date Galland's edition. Galland wrote down these tales from the words of Hanna Diyab.

Galland also adapted his translation to the taste of the time. The immediate success the tales enjoyed was partly due to the vogue for fairy stories (French: contes de fées), which had been started in France in the 1690s by his friend Charles Perrault. Galland was also eager to conform to the literary canons of the era. He cut many of the erotic passages as well as all of the poetry. This caused Sir Richard Burton to refer to "Galland's delightful abbreviation and adaptation" which "in no wise represent(s) the eastern original."

His translation was greeted with immense enthusiasm and had soon been translated into many other European languages: English (a "Grub Street" version appeared in 1706), German (1712), Italian (1722), Dutch (1732), Russian (1763), and Polish (1768). They produced a wave of imitations and the widespread 18th century fashion for oriental tales. As Jorge Luis Borges wrote:

Another fact is undeniable. The most famous and eloquent encomiums of The Thousand and One Nights – by Coleridge, Thomas de Quincey, Stendhal, Tennyson, Edgar Allan Poe, Newman – are from readers of Galland's translation. Two hundred years and ten better translations have passed, but the man in Europe or the Americas who thinks of the Thousand and One Nights thinks, invariably, of this first translation. The Spanish adjective milyunanochesco [thousand-and-one-nights-esque] ... has nothing to do with the erudite obscenities of Burton or Mardrus and everything to do with Antoine Galland's bijoux and sorceries.

== Works ==
- Les paroles remarquables, les bons mots et les maximes des Orientaux, S. Benard, 1694
- Contes et fables indiennes, de Bidpaï et de Lokman; traduites d'Ali-Tchelebi ben Saleh, auteur turc.
- Histoire de l'esclavage d'un marchand de la ville de Cassis, à Tunis, La Bibliothèque, « L'écrivain voyageur ».
- De l’origine et du progrès du café, La Bibliothèque, coll. « L'écrivain voyageur ».
- Le Voyage à Smyrne, Chandeigne, coll. « Magellane », 2000.
- Histoire de Noureddin et de la belle persane, André Versaille Éditeur, 2009
- Histoire d'Aladin ou la lampe merveilleuse
- Les Milles et une Nuits

== See also ==
- Charles Perrault
- Giambattista Basile
- Giovanni Straparola

== Sources ==
- Les mille et une nuits as translated by Galland (Garnier Flammarrion edition, 1965)
- Jorge Luis Borges, "The Translators of The Thousand and One Nights" in The Total Library: Non-Fiction 1922-1986, ed. Eliot Weinberger (Penguin, 1999)
- Sir Richard Burton - The Book of the Thousand Nights and a Night, Volume 1 by Richard Francis Burton, printed by the Burton Club for private subscribers only, printed in the USA
- Robert Irwin The Arabian Nights: A Companion (Penguin, 1995)
