= Henri Basnage de Beauval =

French Huguenot lawyer, controversist and lexicographer (1656–1710)

Henri Basnage de Beauval (7 August 1656 – April 1710) was a French Huguenot lawyer, controversist and lexicographer, known also as a journal editor.

== Life ==
He was born at Rouen, son of the advocate Henri Basnage de Franquesnay and brother of Jacques Basnage. After the Revocation of the Edict of Nantes, he made some attempts to stay in France, but left for Rotterdam in the Netherlands in 1687. He died in The Hague.

== Works ==
He wrote Tolérance des religions, published by Henri de Græff at Rotterdam in 1684; it was a plea to French Catholics for religious tolerance. His Histoire des Ouvrages des Savans was a periodical appearing from 1687 to 1709; it was a sequel to the Nouvelles de la République des Lettres of Pierre Bayle, who had sheltered him and his brother Jacques. The change of title was in fact cosmetic, to avoid trouble with the publisher of the Nouvelles. Basnage himself did almost all the editorial, and the reviews of John Locke's works, in particular, did much to spread his ideas.

He worked over the Dictionnaire universel of Antoine Furetière, producing an expanded edition; it went through numerous editions, before being taken up by Jean Brutel de la Rivière (1727, The Hague). Basnage's version was considered "Protestant"; the Jesuits of the Mémoires de Trévoux found heresy in articles where they considered he had introduced a Protestant view. Basnage defended himself in the Journal des sçavans, but the Jesuits went ahead with an expurgated edition, a model for the Dictionnaire de Trévoux. Basnage's lexicographical approach was in fact more descriptive than normative.

Under the pseudonym Le Fèvre, Basnage also wrote the Lettre sur les differends de M. Jurieu & de M. Bayle.

His publications were:

- Tolérance des religions; edited by Elisabeth Labrousse, New York; London, Johnson Reprint Corp., 1970
- Histoire des Ouvrages des Savans. Volumes 1-24. (September 1687-June 1709), Geneva, Slatkine Reprints, 1969
- Dictionnaire universel: contenant generalement tous les mots françois tant vieux que modernes, & les termes des sciences et des arts ... : et enfin les noms des auteurs qui ont traitté des matieres qui regardent les mots, expliquez avec quelques histoires, curiositez naturelles, & sentences morales, qui seront rapportées pour donner des exemples de phrases & de constructions : le tout extrait des plus excellens auteurs anciens & modernes. New edition by Jean-Baptiste Brutel de La Rivière (1727). Reprinted by Hildesheim, New York, Georg Olms, 1972.
- Traitez de mechanique, de l'equilibre des solides et des liqueurs : où l'on ajoute une nouvelle maniere de demontrer les principaux théorêmes de cette science, with Bernard Lamy, Amsterdam, Mortier, 1734
- Lettre sur les differends de M. Jurieu & de M. Bayle, 1690
- Réponse de l'auteur de l'Histoire des ouvrages des sçavans à l'Avis de M. Jurieu, Rotterdam, Reinier Leers, 1690
- Lettres historiques: contenant ce qui se passe de plus important en Europe; et les réflexions nécessaires sur ce sujet. Tome I [-101]. Mois de Janvier 1692 [-Dec. 1736], with Jean Dumont et al., The Hague, Adrian Moetjens, 1692-1736
