= Les Mille et Un Jours =

1710s stories by François Pétis de la Croix

Les Mille et Un Jours (Note: The word un may also be uncapitalized in French typography. The title was originally spelt without an s: Les Mille et Un Jour.) (French: [le mil e œ̃ ʒuʁ], lit. 'The Thousand and One Days'), subtitled contes persans (lit. 'Persian tales'), is a short story collection with Middle Eastern settings published between the years 1710 and 1712 by the French orientalist François Pétis de la Croix, probably with unacknowledged help from Alain-René Lesage. Though the stories were for the most part adapted very freely from a 15th-century Turkish collection called Ferec baʿde şidde ("Relief After Hardship"), in its structure it is modelled on Antoine Galland's Les Mille et Une Nuits (The Thousand and One Nights), whose immense success it was intended to share. It has had a wide influence on European culture, not least through its retelling of the story of Turandot, which indirectly inspired Puccini's opera and many other works.

== Contents ==
Les Mille et Un Jours, like Les Mille et Une Nuits, is a frame story containing a number of tales and stories within stories. The framework tale, "Histoire de la princesse de Caschemire" (Story of the Princess of Kashmir), tells of the princess Farrukhnaz, who has a dream in which she sees a stag abandon its doe in a trap. She draws from this the moral that men are all ungrateful and faithless, and refuses to marry. Her nurse, Sutlumemé, endeavours to change her mind by telling her stories of a contrary tendency every morning at bath time over a period of 1,001 days. In the original form (Note: Many 18th- and 19th-century editions of Les Mille et Un Jours included additional stories taken from diverse sources.) of Les Mille et Un Jours these stories are:

- Histoire d'Aboulcassem Basri (Story of Aboulcassem Basri)
- Histoire du roi Ruzvanschad et de la princesse Schéhéristani (Story of King Ruzvanschad and of Princess Schéhéristani)

- Histoire du jeune roi de Tibet et de la princesse des Naïmans (Story of the Young King of Tibet and of the Princess of the Naïmans)

- Histoire du vizir Caverscha (Story of the Vizier Caverscha)

- Histoire de Couloufe et de la belle Dilara (Story of Couloufe and of the Beautiful Dilara)
- Histoire du prince Calaf et de la princesse de la Chine (Story of Prince Calaf and of the Princess of China)

- Histoire du prince Fadlallah, fils de Ben-Ortoc, roi de Moussel (Story of Prince Fadlallah, son of Ben-Ortoc, King of Moussel)

- Histoire du roi Bedreddin-Lolo et de son vizir Atalmulk, surnommé le vizir triste (Story of King Bedreddin-Lolo and of His Vizier Atalmulk, Called the Sad Vizier)

- Histoire d'Atalmulk, surnommé le vizir triste, et de la princesse Zélica Béghume (Story of Atalmulk, Called the Sad Vizier, and of Princess Zélica Béghume)

- Histoire du prince Seyf-el-Mulouk (Story of Prince Seyf-el-Mulouk)

- Histoire de Malek et de la princesse Schirine (Story of Malek and of Princess Schirine)

- Histoire du roi Hormoz, surnommé le roi sans chagrin (Story of King Hormoz, Called the King Without Sorrow)

- Histoire d'Avicène (Story of Avicène)

- Histoire de la belle Arouya (Story of the Beautiful Arouya)

- Les Aventures singulières d'Aboulfaouaris, surnommé le grand voyageur (The Singular Adventures of Aboulfaouaris, Called the Great Traveller)

- Premier Voyage (First Voyage)

- Second Voyage (Second Voyage)

- Histoire des deux frères génies, Adis et Dahy (Story of the Two Brother Genies, Adis and Dahy)
- Histoire de Nasiraddolé, roi de Moussel, d'Abderrahmane, marchand de Bagdad, et de la belle Zeïneb (Story of Nasiraddolé, King of Moussel, of Abderrahmane, Merchant of Baghdad, and of the Beautiful Zeïneb)
- Histoire de Repsima (Story of Repsima)

== Composition ==
The French orientalist François Pétis de La Croix spent many years in Syria, Persia and Turkey learning the respective languages of those countries, before in 1695 taking up the post of official Arabic interpreter to the French court at Versailles. When he composed his Mille et un jours, contes persans he took the decision to present them as an incomplete translation (omitting stories about the miracles of the Prophet Mohammed and indecent tales) of a Persian manuscript given to him during his years in the East by the prominent Isfahan dervish Moclès; this manuscript was, according to Pétis, itself a translation made in Moclès' youth of various Indian "comédies", and was entitled in Persian Hezâr va yek ruz (A thousand and one days). In fact, this whole account was a tissue of lies, not the least of which was the title of Moclès' supposed translation, which Pétis invented and adopted for his own work in an attempt to cash in on the huge success of Antoine Galland's French version of Les Mille et Une Nuits (1704–1717). It is believed that Pétis was commissioned to write Les Mille et Un Jours by Marie Adélaïde of Savoy, Duchess of Burgundy, granddaughter-in-law of Louis XIV, and one of the devoted readers of Les Mille et Une Nuits. It is widely agreed (though not by Paul Sebag, Les Mille et Un Jours' most recent editor) that the writer Alain-René Lesage polished up the prose of Pétis' work before publication, though he was not credited for this in the book itself.

== Publication ==
The collection was published between 1710 and 1712 in five volumes. Two of the stories translated by Pétis and submitted to his publisher, Barbin, to be included in the first volume of his Les Mille et Un Jours were instead used by that publisher, without Pétis' permission, to complete volume 8 of Galland's Les Mille et Une Nuits. Pétis was so outraged by this behaviour that he had the remaining four volumes published by another house, Florentin Delaulne.

== Sources ==
In his Preface, Pétis himself acknowledged that their titles were not the only similarity between his own book and Galland's:

In Les Mille et Une Nuits it is a prince that is prejudiced against women, and in Les Mille et Un Jours it is a princess that is prejudiced against men. It is believed that one of these works gave rise to the other, but as the Arab tales cannot be dated we cannot say whether they were made before or after the Persian tales.

If the framework harks back to Les Mille et Une Nuits, the constituent tales draw to some extent on various Persian sources, but to a much greater one on a 15th-century Turkish collection called Ferec baʿde şidde ("Relief After Hardship"), which was available to him in a copy brought to the West by Galland in 1679. These Turkish tales he did not so much translate as adapt with the greatest possible freedom, producing a work which, it has been said, "stands halfway between literary creation, translation, adaptation and deception". Such a cavalier approach to source-material was not unprecedented: Pétis had learned it from Galland's treatment of the Arabic tales which figure in Les Mille et Une Nuits, and in both works it creates for the reader the impression that he is being immersed in authentic Asiatic folklore.

== Influence ==
The publication of Les Mille et Une Nuits and Les Mille et Un Jours had the effect of making collections of fairy tales of an Eastern type, a genre that Voltaire was to call "les Mille et un", fashionable for the rest of the Ancien Régime period. Books showing their influence include Jean-Paul Bignon's Les Aventures d'Abdalla, fils d'Hanif (1712–1714); Thomas-Simon Gueullette's Les Mille et un quarts d'heure (1712), Les Mille et une heures (1733) and Les Mille et une soirées (1749); François-Augustin de Paradis de Moncrif's Les Mille et une faveurs (1716); Antoine Hamilton's Fleur d'Épine (1730) and Les Quatre Facardins (1730); Louis-Charles Fougeret de Monbron's Le Canapé couleur de feu (1741); Jacques Cazotte's Les Mille et une fadaises (1742); Claude Prosper Jolyot de Crébillon's Le Sopha, conte moral (1742) and Les Amours de Zeokinizul roi des Kofirans (1746); Jacques Rochette de La Morlière's Angola (1746); Denis Diderot's Les Bijoux indiscrets (1748); Pierre-Jean-Baptiste Nougaret's Les Mille et une folies (1771); and the anonymous Mille et un mea culpa (1789). Other 18th-century French works show a more direct influence. Alain-René Lesage, who may well have been employed to improve the style of Les Mille et Un Jours, made use of several of its stories in his own comic plays and in his picaresque novel Gil Blas, as did Charles Collé in his libretto to Pierre-Alexandre Monsigny's opera L'île sonnante (1767–68). In the late 19th century Les Mille et Un Jours reportedly remained more popular than any other work of its kind, Les Mille et Une Nuits alone excepted.

Elsewhere in Europe, themes and names from Les Mille et Un Jours appear in the stories of Christoph Martin Wieland, and in Hans Christian Andersen's fairy tale of "The Flying Trunk". But much more impact on European culture was made by two plays of the Venetian, Carlo Gozzi, deriving from Les Mille et Un Jours. His Il re cervo (The King Stag) is partly based on its Histoire du Prince Fadlallah, and in its turn inspired incidental music by Francis Chagrin as well as Hans Werner Henze's opera König Hirsch (1952–1955), revised in 1962 as Il re cervo. Another of Gozzi's plays, Turandot, was adapted into German blank verse by Friedrich Schiller in 1802 as Turandot, Prinzessin von China, and this adaptation was itself translated back into Italian by Andrea Maffei. Gozzi's or Schiller's versions have been the inspiration for many operas; the two best known are Ferrucio Busoni's Turandot (1917), a work which grew out of his incidental music for a production of the Gozzi play in a translation by Karl Vollmöller, and Puccini's Turandot (1926), the libretto of which, by Giuseppe Adami and Renato Simoni, is based on the Maffei version. Other operas on the subject were written by, among others, Franz Danzi, Carl Gottlieb Reissiger, Johann Vesque von Püttlingen, Herman Severin Løvenskiold, Adolf Jensen, Antonio Bazzini, Theobald Rehbaum, Havergal Brian, and Detlev Glanert; not to mention a ballet, Prinzessin Turandot (1942), by Gottfried von Einem. There is incidental music by Carl Maria von Weber for an 1809 production of Schiller's play, and further sets of incidental music by Vinzenz Lachner, Wilhelm Stenhammar, Ernst Toch, Bernhard Paumgartner, and Roger Sessions. Giuseppe Giacosa, Percy MacKaye, and Bertolt Brecht each wrote a Turandot play, while Wolfgang Hildesheimer wrote three. There are at least three films drawing directly or indirectly on Gozzi's Turandot: the German Prinzessin Turandot (1934), the latter's French-language version Turandot, princesse de Chine (1934), and the Chinese The Curse of Turandot (2021).

== Modern edition ==
- Pétis de la Croix, François (2003). Sebag, Paul (ed.). Les Mille et Un Jours : contes persans. Paris: Phébus. ISBN 9782859408992.

== English translations ==
Many individual tales from Les Mille et Un Jours have been translated in conjunction with other works. The following translations confine themselves entirely to François Pétis de la Croix's Oriental tales:

- King, William; et al. (1714). The Persian and the Turkish Tales, Compleat. London: W. Mears and J. Browne. In 2 volumes. Includes also a translation of Pétis' earlier Contes Turcs.
- Philips, Ambrose (1714–1715). The Thousand and One Days: Persian Tales. London: Jacob Tonson. In 3 volumes.
- Button, Edward (1754). A New Translation of the Persian Tales. London: W. Owen.
- McCarthy, Justin Huntly (1892). The Thousand and One Days: Persian Tales. London: Chatto & Windus. In 2 volumes.
