= Turandot (disambiguation) =

Turandot is a 1926 opera by Giacomo Puccini.

Other works of that title include:

- Turandot (Gozzi) (1762), play by Carlo Gozzi, and its many later adaptations
- Turandot Suite (1904-5), orchestral suite by Ferruccio Busoni
- Turandot (Busoni) (1917), opera by Ferruccio Busoni
- Turandot (Brecht) (1953/54), play by Bertolt Brecht

== See also ==
- 530 Turandot, a minor planet named for Puccini's character
- Crystal Turandot Award, a Russian theatre award created in 1991
- The Curse of Turandot, 2021 film, loosely based on Gozzi's play
- Princess Turandot (disambiguation)
