= François Pétis de la Croix =

French orientalist (1653–1713)

François Pétis de la Croix (1653–1713) was a French orientalist.

De la Croix was born in Paris, the son of the Arabic interpreter of the French court and author, also named François Pétis de la Croix (1622–1695) and inherited this office at his father's death, afterwards transmitting it to his own son, Alexandre Louis Marie, who also became a notable orientalist. At an early age, de la Croix was sent by Jean-Baptiste Colbert to the Middle East; during the ten years he spent in Syria, Persia and Turkey he learned Arabic, Persian and Turkish and collected materials which he would use in future writings.

== Travel in the Middle East ==
In 1670 Pétis de la Croix, age seventeen, travelled to the Middle East on an extended language course as part of a program devised by Colbert to create a pool of capable foreign officials – les Jeunes de Langues. After a study period in Aleppo, he arrived in 1674 in Isfahan where he stayed until June 1676. From a short description of his stay we learn of his deep interest in the manners of the "dervish":

Having worked six full months on the Shahnama, together with Mulla Kerim, the extreme dedication made me fall into an illness lasting two months – on the brink of death – from which I hardly recovered to find that notwithstanding the twenty volumes of books I had read, I did not yet know the registers of the court, the patents of the king or the rules of the merchants (...) I still had to learn from a certain theological and very difficult book called Masnavi (comprising at least 90,000 verses – the good people of the country have it that it contains the Philosopher's stone). I looked for someone who knew the book, but against payment I found no one and was obliged to turn to a great superior of the Mevlevi. A friend conducted me there and I had hardly paid my respects or he offered me his services for the understanding of the Masnavi and he allowed me during four or five months to see him very frequently to study. I succeeded in this study (...) his name was Dervish Moqlas. Since he was capable of leading a party I knew he was under observation of the court and so I had to take my precautions. I did not hesitate to inform Monseigneur Murtaza, brother in law to the king, and Myrza Ali Reza, also from the king's family and Cheikh al Islam, the head of the law, that I only went there to read the Masnavi, which they approved.

In the same description, Pétis de la Croix tells of a prank played on him by his Agha who during a visit to a Bektashi convent caused him to pose as a shaykh:

I said them the fatha (first sura of the Qur'an) over the meat with the usual movements; after the meal I read extensively from the Qur'an and I chose the chapters dealing with morals and not with Mahomet which I explained according to the commentaries I had read. I also clarified some difficulties they had (...) of course my Agha could not help making a mockery of this; he almost choked laughing and told everyone I had come all the way from France to teach the Asian Muslims the Qur'an.

Despite the flourishing of Orientalism in France in the 17th century, and despite the fact that Antoine Galland, Barthélemy d'Herbelot de Molainville and François Pétis de la Croix at one time frequented the Wednesday afternoon discussions – les Mercuriales – of Gilles Ménage together, little has remained of the explicit and detailed references to the Masnavi or Sufism in general one could have expected from Pétis de la Croix – or François Bernier for that matter.

One should however keep in mind the real risk run by deviating opinion. It was not until 1682 following the Versailles edict that only the intention to kill with poison and sacrilege coupled with that intention could be withheld as grounds for capital punishment over witchcraft. The proceedings against the Quietists thus only narrowly escaped the greater dangers of the lingering witch craze.

In 1685 concerted Catholic censorship became a matter of State after the edict of Fontainebleau; the opinion had by then developed that there was much resemblance between the Quietism of East and West (see: "Lettre sur le quiétisme des Indes" by François Bernier in Histoire des Ouvrages des Savans, Henri Basnage de Beauval (ed.), September 1688).

== Later life ==
He served briefly as secretary to the French ambassador in Morocco, and was interpreter to the French forces sent against Algiers, contributing to the satisfactory settlement of the treaty of peace, which was drawn up by him in Turkish and ratified in 1684. He conducted the negotiations with Tunis and Tripoli in 1685, and those with Morocco in 1687; and in 1692 he was ultimately rewarded with an appointment to the Arabic chair in the Collège de France, which he held until his death in 1713.

== Works ==
He published Contes Turcs (Paris, 1707), an Armenian Dictionary, and an Account of Ethiopia.

He also wrote The Thousand and One Days (French: Les mille et un jours), a collection of fairy tales based on the model of One Thousand and One Nights. It was published in five volumes between 1710 and 1712. He supposedly translated it from a Persian compilation titled Hazar u yek ruz (هزار و یک روز, lit. 'A Thousand and One Days') which he acquired from one 'Dervish Mocles' or 'Moklas' in Isfahan in 1675. In fact, it was a very free adaptation of the Turkish Ferec baʿd eş-şidde ('Relief After Adversity'). The book's publisher Barbin asked Alain-René Lesage to rework de la Croix's translations into marketable French. Barbin also included two of the stories at the end of the eighth volume of Antoine Galland's Les mille et une nuits (1709), outraging Galland, who switched publishers for subsequent volumes. Stories from The Thousand and One Days inspired other works including Carlo Gozzi's Il re cervo (The King Stag) and Turandot.

He edited and published in 1710 his father's authoritative biography of Genghis Khan, History of Genghizcan the Great, First Emperor of the Ancient Moguls and Tartars, translated into English by Penelope Aubin and published in 1722. This work was popularized in the American colonies by Benjamin Franklin and may have influenced Thomas Jefferson's Virginia Statute for Religious Freedom.

His best-known work is his French translation of Sharaf ad-Din Ali Yazdi's Zafarnama, which was published after Pétis de la Croix's death (4 vols., Paris, 1722; Eng. trans. by J Darby, London, 1723). Although the translation is generally well-regarded, Pétis de la Croix erroneously identified Timur himself as the biography's sponsor, when in fact the book was commissioned by Timur's grandson Ibrahim Sultan.

== See also ==
- Orientalism in early modern France
- Sufi studies
- Paul Sebag (1998), "Sur deux orientalistes français du XVIIe siècle: F. Petis de la Croix et le sieur de la Croix," Revue de l'Occident musulman et de la Méditerranée 25: pp. 89–117.
