= Jean-Baptiste Brutel de la Rivière =

Jean-Baptiste Brutel de la Rivière (17 August 1669 – 14 August 1742) was a French Protestant minister, in exile in the Netherlands, and man of letters.

== Life ==
He was born in Montpellier on 17 August 1669, into a noble family of Languedoc; he was the son of Gédéon Brutel de la Rivière. He studied first in Zurich, and after the Revocation of the Edict of Nantes went to Rotterdam, Utrecht and Leiden. He became pastor of the Walloon church at Veere in 1695, moving to Rotterdam in 1702.

He died on 14 August 1742, in Amsterdam.

== Works ==
With Moses Solanus, he translated the Historical Connection of the Old and New Testaments of Humphrey Prideaux into French, as Histoire des Juifs et des peuples voisins, depuis la décadence des royaumes d'Israël & de Juda jusqu'à la mort de Jésus-Christ (1722). He was the choice of Jacques Basnage to complete the edition by Henri Basnage de Beauval of the Dictionnaire universel of Antoine Furetière, appearing in 1727. He also published Sermons sur divers textes de l'Ecriture Sainte (1746).
