= Dictionnaire universel =

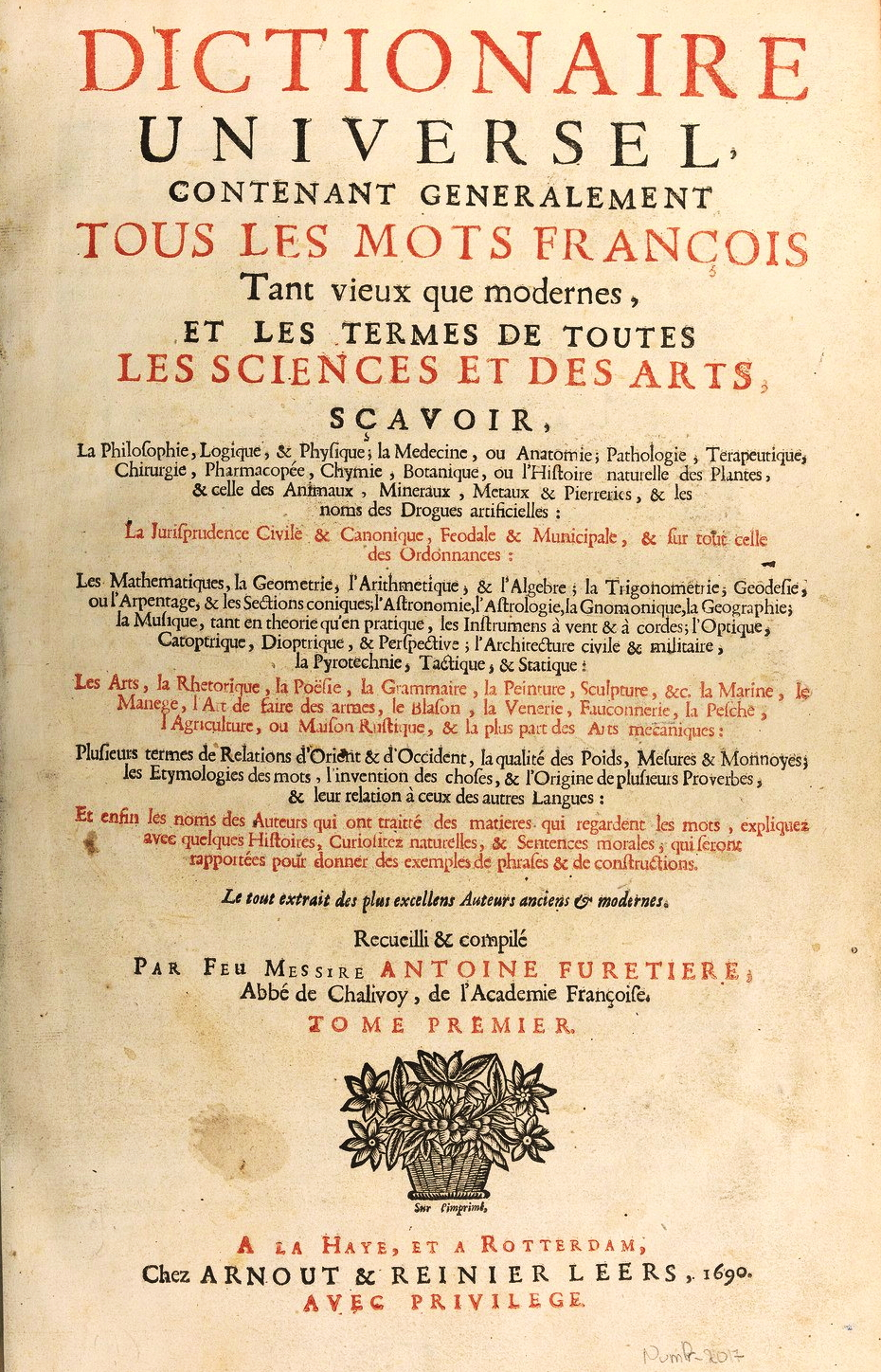

The Dictionnaire universel, contenant generalement tous les mots françois (originally Dictionaire universel) was a dictionary and encyclopedia compiled by Antoine Furetière and published posthumously in 1690. Unlike the rival dictionary of the Académie française, finally published in 1694, Furetière's Dictionnaire included specialized technical and scientific vocabulary. It was also an encyclopedia of sorts in dealing with things as well as words. Despite having been banned in France, it was a commercial success and exerted an enormous influence on eighteenth-century French dictionaries and encyclopedias.

== Origins and Publication ==
At the time of its founding, the Académie française had been entrusted with the task of producing a complete dictionary of the French language. At first, Furetière participated in the collaborative project with enthusiasm, but he eventually grew frustrated with his colleagues' approach and slow progress and began work on his own dictionary, probably around 1676–78. In 1684 he published a sample of articles from his proposed dictionary under the title Essais d'un Dictionnaire universel. This work was reprinted in 1685 and 1687.

When members of the academy heard that Furetière was about to publish his dictionary, they interfered, alleging that he had stolen their material and violated the monopoly they had held on French dictionaries since 1674. In 1685, after fierce recriminations on both sides, Furetière was expelled from the academy, and the French government revoked his permission to publish the dictionary. In 1690, the Dictionaire universel was published posthumously in the Netherlands with a preface by Pierre Bayle, who had helped arrange for the work's publication.

Furetière's Dictionnaire continued to be edited and republished through 1727. The second edition (1701) and the third edition (1708) were revised and improved by the Protestant jurist Henri Basnage de Beauval (1656–1710). A fourth edition, edited by Jean-Baptiste Brutel de la Rivière, appeared in 1727.

- 1690 : Dictionaire universel. The Hague and Rotterdam: Arnoud et Reinier Leers. First edition. 3 volumes. Preface by Pierre Bayle. Posthumous publication.
- 1691 : Dictionaire universel. The Hague & Rotterdam: Arnoud et Reinier Leers. Reprint of first edition in 2 volumes.
- 1701 : Dictionnaire universel. The Hague & Rotterdam: Arnoud et Reinier Leers. Second edition. 3 volumes. Edited by Henri Basnage de Beauval.
- 1702 : Dictionnaire universel. The Hague & Rotterdam: Arnoud et Reinier Leers. Reprint of second edition in 2 volumes.
- 1708 : Dictionnaire universel. Rotterdam: Reinier Leers. Third edition. 3 volumes. Edited by Henri Basnage de Beauval.
- 1727 : Dictionnaire universel. The Hague: Pierre Husson, Thomas Johnson, Jean Swart, and others. Fourth edition. 4 volumes. Edited by Jean-Baptiste Brutel de la Rivière.

== Reuse by the encyclopedists of Trévoux ==
In 1704, a three-volume encyclopedia was published outside Lyon at Trévoux, then the capital of Dombes, under the title of Dictionnaire universel françois et latin. It was different from Furetière's Dictionnaire in two main respects. First, as its title indicated, it included a bilingual dictionary of French and Latin in the final volume. Second, the anonymous authors attempted to re-Catholicize the Dutch-published encyclopedia and cleanse it of Protestant notions. Otherwise, the Dictionnaire de Trévoux, as it came to be known, was nearly identical to the 1701 edition of Furetière's Dictionnaire, a source of outrage to Basnage, who thought that his and Furetière's work should have been acknowledged.

The Dictionnaire de Trévoux continued to be published through 1771. Despite repeated denials on the part of the Jesuits, it seems clear that they were largely responsible for production of the encyclopedia at least prior to the suppression of the Jesuits in France in 1763.
