= Turandot (Brecht) =

Turandot or The Whitewashers' Congress
- Original language: German
- Written by: Bertolt Brecht
- Subject: Intellectuals, ideology, bureaucracy and the state
- Genre: Epic comedy
- Setting: China

Premiere
- Date: 5 February 1969
- Place: Zürich Schauspielhaus

Turandot or the Whitewashers' Congress is an epic comedy by the German modernist playwright Bertolt Brecht. It was written during the summer of 1953 in Buckow and substantially revised in light of a brief period of rehearsals in 1954, though it was still incomplete at the time of Brecht's death in 1956 and did not receive its first production until several years later. It premièred on 5 February 1969 at the Zürich Schauspielhaus, in a production directed by Benno Besson and Horst Sagert, with music by Yehoshua Lakner.

The story is loosely based on Count Carlo Gozzi's commedia dell'arte play Turandot (1762), a production of which Brecht saw in Moscow in 1932, directed by Yevgeny Vakhtangov. From 1930 onwards, Brecht began to develop a version of his own, which became part of a wider complex of projects exploring the role of intellectuals (or "Tuis," as he called them) in a capitalist society. Brecht's protagonist is coarse, lacking the whimsical charm of Gozzi's portrayal and the aspiration to nobility in Schiller's adaptation (1801).

The play consists of 27 subdividing pictures in 10 major scenes. The plot concerns a panic in the Imperial Court over how to explain the high price of cotton, despite the recent vast harvest. A contest is held: the prize for the Tui who can formulate the best explanation for the cotton shortage is the hand of the princess Turandot in marriage. Turandot is noted for its critique of the commoditization of the intellect in capitalist society.

In the figure of Gogher Gogh, a Brechtian gangster who seizes power and terrorizes his political rivals and the ineffective Tuis, scholars have read an allegory of fascism. The play ends with the forces of Kai Ho, a peasant revolutionary, clamoring outside the palace. The people have been placated neither by the Tui's intellectual hair-splitting nor Gogher Gogh's anti-intellectual terror.

The play had its British première in an amateur production in 1970 and a professional production at the Oxford Playhouse in 1971.

== Sources ==
- Brecht, Bertolt. 2004. Turandot or The Whitewashers' Conference. Trans. Tom Kuhn. In Kuhn and Constantine (2004, 127-193).
- Jacobs, Nicholas and Prudence Ohlsen, eds. 1977. Bertolt Brecht in Britain. London: IRAT Services Ltd and TQ Publications. ISBN 0-904844-11-0.
- Kuhn, Tom and David Constantine, eds. 2004. Collected Plays: Eight. By Bertolt Brecht. Bertolt Brecht: Plays, Poetry, Prose Ser. London: Methuen. ISBN 0-413-77352-3.
- Müller-Waldeck, Gunnar. 1981. Vom "Tui"-Roman zu "Turandot". Ed. Brecht-Zentrum der DDR, Berlin: 1981.
- Sacks, Glendyr. 1994. "A Brecht Calendar." In Thomson and Sacks (1994, xvii-xxvii).
- Thomson, Peter. 1994. "Brecht's Lives". In Thomson and Sacks (1994, 22-39).
- Thomson, Peter and Glendyr Sacks, eds. 1994. The Cambridge Companion to Brecht. Cambridge Companions to Literature Ser. Cambridge: Cambridge University Press. ISBN 0-521-41446-6.
- Willett, John. 1967. The Theatre of Bertolt Brecht: A Study from Eight Aspects. Third rev. ed. London: Methuen, 1977. ISBN 0-413-34360-X.
