= Tui (intellectual) =

A Tui is an intellectual who sells his or her abilities and opinions as a commodity in the marketplace or who uses them to support the dominant ideology of an oppressive society. The German modernist theatre practitioner Bertolt Brecht invented the term and used it in a range of critical and creative projects, including the material that he developed in the mid-1930s for his so-called Tui-Novel—an unfinished satire on intellectuals in the German Empire and Weimar Republic—and his epic comedy from the early 1950s, Turandot or the Whitewashers' Congress. The word is a neologism that results from the acronym of a word play on "intellectual" ("Tellekt-Ual-In").

According to Mark Clark:

... the critique of intellectuals which Brecht developed... around the notion of ‘Tuismus’ engages a model of the public intellectual in which the self-image of the artist and thinker as a socially and politically engaged person corresponded to the expectations of the public. Partisan without being bound to a party, independent of official institutions yet experienced in surviving within institutions, prepared to entertain risks and undertake unconventional experiments: this was how Brecht accommodated a world which he envisioned as changeable. His antagonistic worldview fed on crisis and found its most productive, creative impulse in the escalation of contradictions.

Brecht routinely referred to the members of the Frankfurt School, particularly Theodor Adorno, as "Tuis". The corresponding term "Tuism" describes the theory and practice of the Tui-intellectual.

== Sources ==
- Jay, Martin (1996). The Dialectical Imagination: A History of the Frankfurt School and the Institute of Social Research, 1923–1950. Weimar & Now: German Cultural Criticism series. New ed. Berkeley: University of California Press. ISBN 0-520-20423-9.
- Kuhn, Tom and David Constantine, eds. (2004). Collected Plays: Eight. By Bertolt Brecht. Bertolt Brecht: Plays, Poetry, Prose Series. London: Methuen. ISBN 0-413-77352-3.
- Leming, Warren (June 2005). "Tui Tsunami: Brecht Reception and Homeland Insecurity". Communications from the International Brecht Society 34: 43–45.
