= Dictionnaire de Trévoux =

French-Latin dictionary

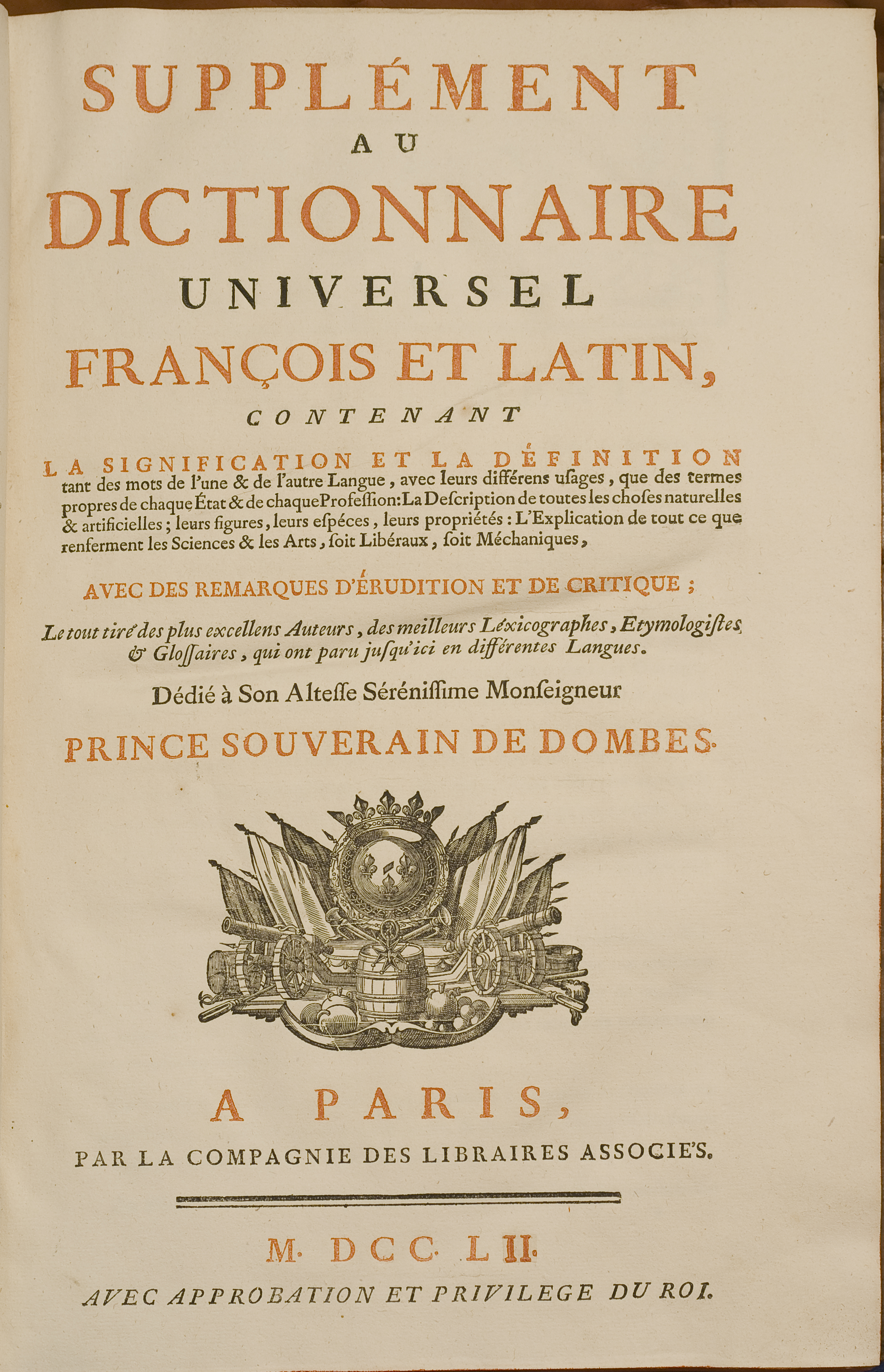
Title page of the Supplément au dictionnaire universel françois et latin (Paris, 1752)

The Dictionnaire de Trévoux (French pronunciation: [diksjɔnɛːʁ də tʁevu]), also titled Dictionnaire universel françois et latin, is a French dictionary that appeared in several editions from 1704 to 1771. It was unofficially and then officially nicknamed Dictionnaire de Trévoux because of its original publication in the town of Trévoux (near Lyon, France) Throughout the 18th century, it was widely assumed to be directed by the Jesuits, a supposition supported by at least some modern scholars.

The first edition (1704) of the Dictionnaire de Trévoux was close to being a reprint of the 1701 edition of Antoine Furetière's Dictionnaire universel (1690), with a small number of revisions and added articles as well as a Latin-French dictionary in the last volume.

A few decades later, the Dictionnaire de Trévoux was pirated in its own turn: the publisher Pierre Antoine, from Nancy, brought out two editions in competition with the original series before agreeing to cooperate on the 1752 edition. From its much expanded second edition (1721) onward, the Dictionnaire de Trévoux came to be respected and widely used, becoming an important source for Ephraim Chambers' Cyclopaedia (1728) and the Encyclopédie (1751–72).

Following is a list of editions of the Dictionnaire de Trévoux with their dates, place of publication, size, and format:

- 1704, Trévoux, 2-3 volumes in folio, variations by printing and binding are not distinguished on title pages;
  - One version printed and bound in three volumes as: A-D, E-N, and M-Z.
  - Another version printed and bound in three volumes as: A-F, G-R, and S-Z.
- 1721, Trévoux, 5 volumes in folio;
- 1732, Paris, 5 volumes in folio;
- 1734, Nancy, 5 volumes in folio;
- 1738-42, Nancy, 6 volumes in folio;
- 1743, Paris, 6 volumes in folio;
- 1752, Paris or Nancy, 8-9 volumes in folio, including a one-or-two-volume supplement;
- 1762, Paris, 2-3 volumes in quarto (an abridged edition); and
- 1771, Paris, 8 volumes in folio.
