= Moses Solanus =

French classical scholar

Moses Solanus or Moïse du Soul (1665 – 1735?) was a French classical scholar.

== Life ==
He was grandson of Paul du Soul of Tours, who was professor of theology and rector of Saumur Academy between 1657 and 1661. As a Protestant he was driven from France by persecution, and seems to have settled at Amsterdam, before moving to England. His Greek scholarship recommended him to the notice of men of influence at both Oxford and Cambridge. He graduated Master of Arts (MA) at the University of Cambridge in 1701, per literas regias; he already had an MA from one of the University of Groningen and University of Franeker, where he had studied, and had at Franeker been a pupil of Jacob Rhenfurd, around 1700

Encouraged by Richard Bentley, he projected an edition of Lucian, of which in 1708 he printed a specimen at Cambridge, and he collected materials for a life of the writer. Nothing, however, came of this edition. In the same year he was employed in the family of the Earl of Wharton. In 1722 and 1723 he was at The Hague, possibly on a mission to the Wetsteins.

A passage in the preface of Johan Frederik Reitz's edition of Lucian shows that he was living after 1733. He appears to have died before 1737.

== Works ==
Solanus wrote against the view of Sebastian Fochen, that New Testament Greek contained only expressions from classical Greek. His work on the subject appeared in the collection of Jacob Rhenferd.

With Jean-Baptiste Brutel de la Rivière, he translated Humphrey Prideaux's An Historical Connection of the Old and New Testaments into French, as Histoire des Juifs et des peuples voisins (Amsterdam, 1722). Returning to England, he completed an edition of Plutarch's Lives (5 vols. London, 1729); it had been started by Augustine Bryan, and Thomas Bentley had then proposed to continue it.
