= Princess Turandot =

Princess Turandot may refer to:

- The main character in Turandot, a play by Carlo Gozzi written in 1762
- Princess Turandot, a 1922 play staged by Russian-Armenian theatre director Yevgeny Vakhtangov
- Prinzessin Turandot, a 1934 German film known as Princess Turandot in English
  - Turandot, Princess of China, 1935 French version of the German film
- Princess Turandot, a 2000 play written and produced by American theatre director Darko Tresnjak

== See also ==
- Turandot (disambiguation)
