= Augustine Bryan =

English classical scholar

Augustine Bryan (died 1726) was an English classical scholar, known for his edition of Plutarch's Lives.

== Life ==
He was the son of Augustine Bryan of London, and studied at St Paul's School. He matriculated at Trinity College, Cambridge in 1708 (B.A. 1711, M.A. 1716). He was instituted to the rectory of Piddlehinton, Dorset, on 16 January 1722; and died on 6 April 1726.

== Works ==
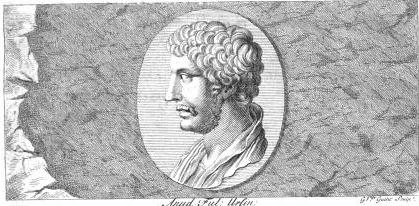
Head of Alcibiades by Gerard Vandergucht, from Bryan's Plutarch.

Bryan published a sermon on the election of the lord mayor in 1718, and just before his death he had finished the printing of an edition of Plutarch's Lives. It was completed by Moses du Soul, and was published under the title of Plutarchi Chæronensis Vitæ Parallelæ, cum singulis aliquot. Græce et Latine. Adduntur variantes Lectiones ex MSS. Codd. Veteres et Novæ, Doctorum Virorum Notæ et Emendationes, et Indices accuratissimi, 5 vols., London, 1723–9. It contains heads of the illustrious persons, engraved from gems. The Greek text is printed from the Paris edition of 1624, with a few corrections, and the Latin translation is also mainly adopted from that edition.
