= Pierre-Jean-Baptiste Nougaret =

French man of letters

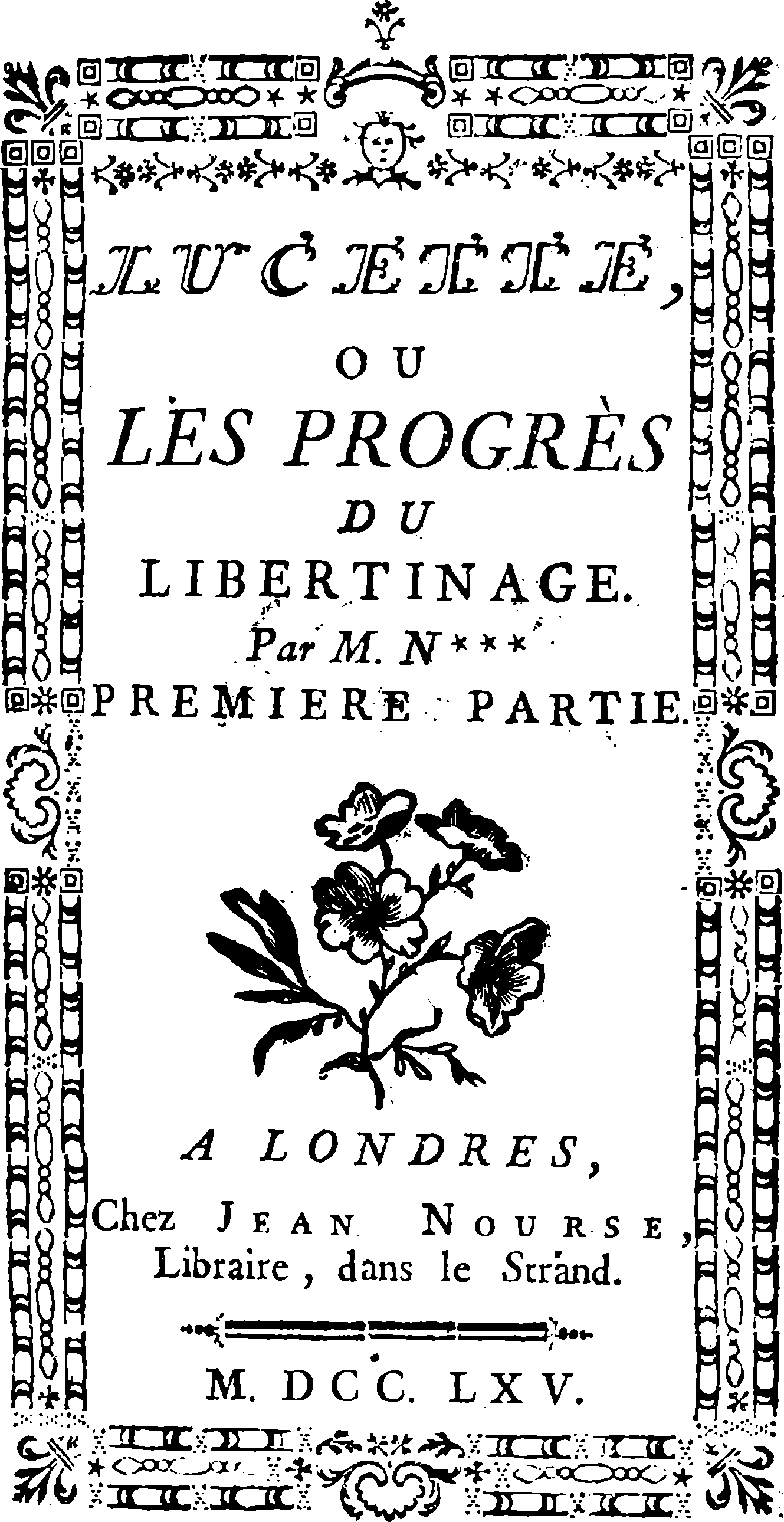

Pierre-Jean-Baptiste Nougaret (16 December 1742, La Rochelle – 27 June 1823, Paris) was an 18th–19th-century French man of letters. He is the author of over one hundred forty volumes covering the most diverse subjects and in all genres: serious and facetious poems, dramas, parodies, historical compilations, political writings, collections of anas, epistolary novels, novels, memoirs. He is best known for his involvement with Nicolas Edme Restif de La Bretonne, whom he met on his arrival in Paris in 1766. He died 27 June 1823 in Paris, at 4 rue d'Assas, aged eighty.

== Works ==
The works of this poet, novelist, playwright, and author include:

- written between 1758 and 1763: La famille en désordre, parody of Le Père de famille by Denis Diderot
- 1763–1766: Lucette ou les Progrès du libertinage, novel (Paris, 6 vol. in-18°)
- 1765: La Capucinade, very licenciouos novel, in-12°)
- 1769: Ainsi va le monde, ou les jolis péchés d’une marchande de mode, novel (Paris, in-12°, several reprints.)
- 1769: De l'art du théâtre en général (2 vol. in-12°)
- 1771: Les Mille et une Folies, tales (Paris, 4 vol. in-12°)
- 1773: Almanach forain, ou les différens Spectacles des Boulevards et des Foires de Paris 1773
- 1775: Les Astuces de Paris, anecdotes parisiennes
- 1777: Le Vidangeur sensible, three-act drama
- 1777: La Paysanne pervertie, ou Mœurs des grandes villes
- 1777: Suzette et Perrin ou les Dangers du libertinage
- 1779: Les Faiblesses d'une jolie femme
- 1779: Éloge de Voltaire, poem
- 1781: Les Sottises et les Folies parisiennes
- 1785: Les Dangers de la sympathie : Lettres de Henriette de Belval, au Baron de Luzi, & de différentes personnes qui ont eu part aux principaux évènemens de sa vie
- 1787: Historiettes du jour, ou Paris tel qu'il est
- 1776–1791: Anecdotes du règne de Louis XVI, 6 vol. in-12°)
- 1797: Histoire des prisons de Paris et des départements, 4. vol. in-12°)
- 1802: Sémiramis, tragédie lyrique in three acts
- 1802: Les Mœurs du temps, ou Mémoires de Rosalie de Terval, novel, 4 vol. in-12°)
- 1807: Histoire du donjon et du château de Vincennes, 3 vol. in-8°
- 1808: Anecdotes militaires de tous les peuples, 4 vol, in-8°)
- 1810: Les Enfants célèbres, 2 vol. in-12°)
- 1811: Beautés de l’histoire d’Angleterre, in-12°), d’Allemagne 1812, in-12°), de Pologne 1814, in-12°), d’Espagne 1814°, in-12°), de Suède (1817), de Paris (1820, in-12°), du règne des Bourbons (1822, in-12°), de l’Histoire ecclésiastique 1822, in-12°), de l'histoire des États-Unis de l'Amérique Septentrionale1824, etc.

== Bibliography ==
- François-Xavier Feller (1832). Dictionnaire historique. Vol. IX. Lille: L. Lefort. p. 535. Feller.
- François-Joseph Fétis (1867). Biographie universelle des musiciens et bibliographie générale de la musique. Vol. VI. Paris: Firmin Didot, frères, fils & Cie. p. 333. Fétis.
- Havard de la Montagne, Philippe (2007). "De l'amitié à la haine : Rétif et Nougaret". Études Rétiviennes. Société Rétif de la Bretonne.
- Ferdinand Hoefer (dir.) (1866). Nouvelle biographie générale depuis les temps les plus reculés jusqu'à nos jours. Firmin Didot frères. pp. 314–317. Hoefer.
- Pierre-Damien Rainguet (1831). Biographie saintongeoise. Saintes. pp. 424–428. Rainguet.
- Dietmar Rieger (1997). "Les Dangers de la ville, Rétif de La Bretonne et la bohème littéraire". Dynamique sociale et formes littéraires: De la société de cour à la misère des grandes villes. Gunter Narr Verlag Tübingen, Études littéraires françaises. pp. 57–66. ISBN 9783823346173.
- Gustave Vapereau (1876). Dictionnaire universel des littératures. Paris: Hachette. p. 1494. Vapereau.
