= Turandot (Gozzi) =

1762 commedia dell'arte play by Carlo Gozzi

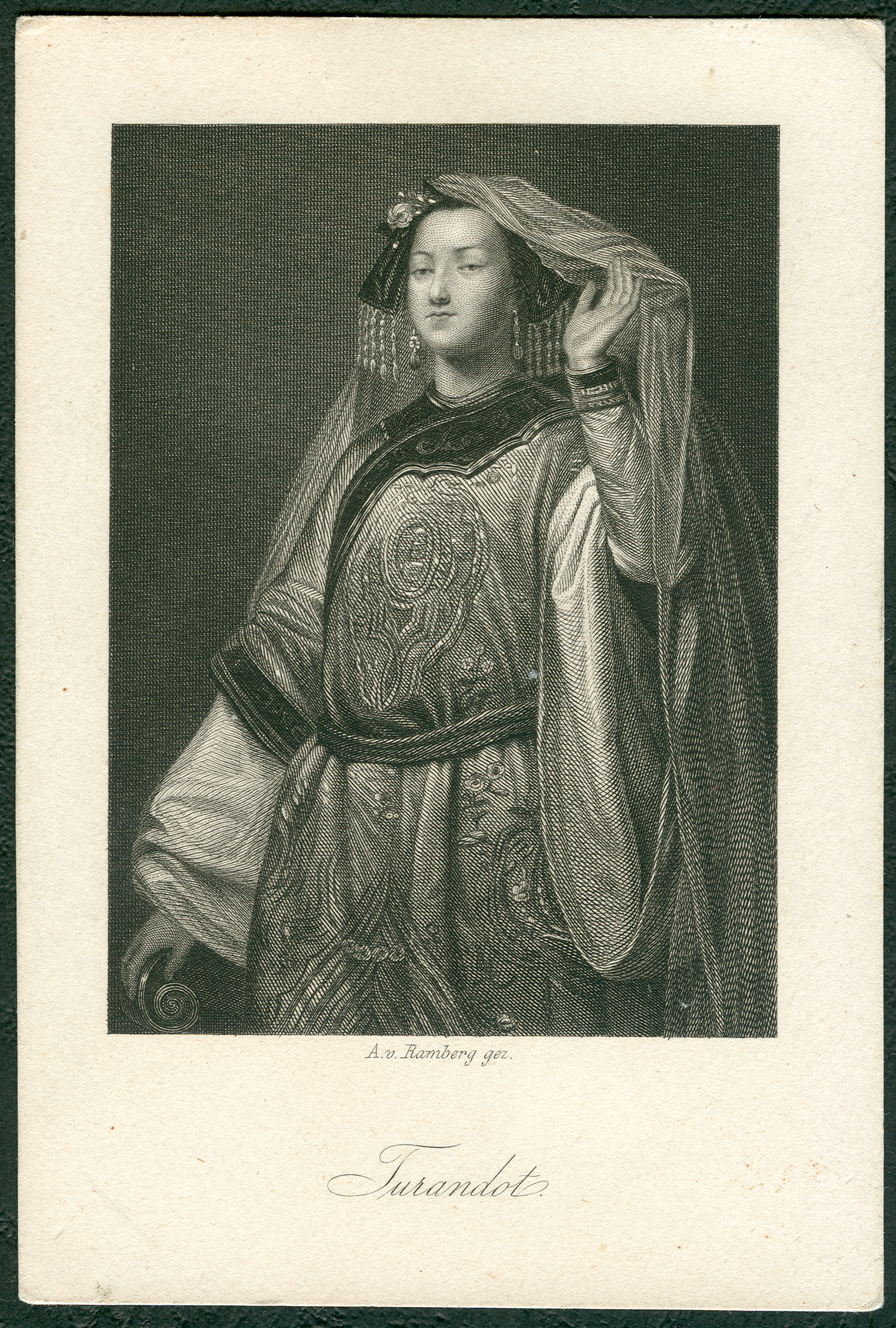
Turandot, 1859 steelpoint engraving by Arthur von Ramberg, from a collection of characters from Schiller.

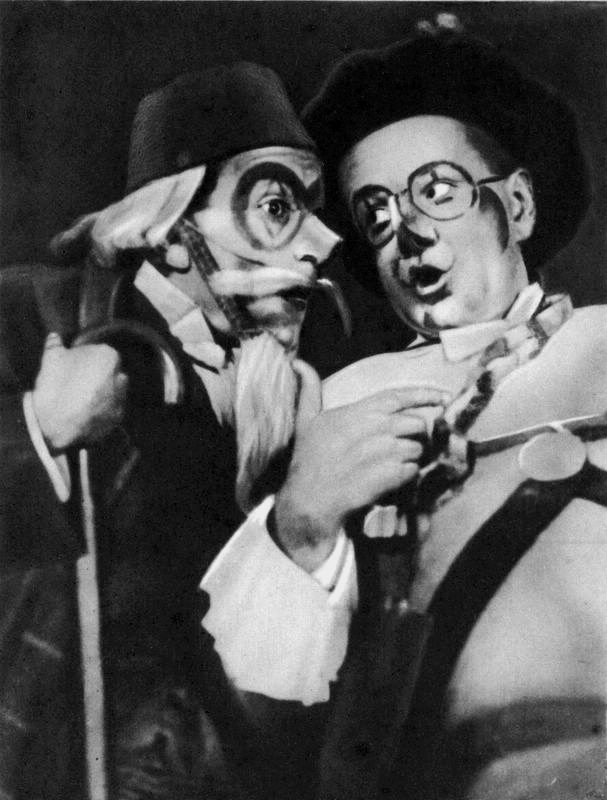
Yevgeny Vakhtangov's production of Turandot in 1922.

Turandot (1762) is a commedia dell'arte play by Count Carlo Gozzi after a supposedly Persian story from the collection Les Mille et Un Jours (1710–1712) by François Pétis de la Croix (not to be confused with One Thousand and One Nights). Gozzi's Turandot was first performed at the Teatro San Samuele, Venice, on 22 January 1762.

Gozzi's play has given rise to a number of subsequent artistic endeavours, including combinations of: versions/translations by Friedrich Schiller, Karl Vollmöller and Bertolt Brecht; theatrical productions by Johann Wolfgang von Goethe, Max Reinhardt and Yevgeny Vakhtangov; incidental music by Carl Maria von Weber, Ferruccio Busoni and Wilhelm Stenhammar; and operas by Busoni, Giacomo Puccini and Havergal Brian.

== Original play and performance ==
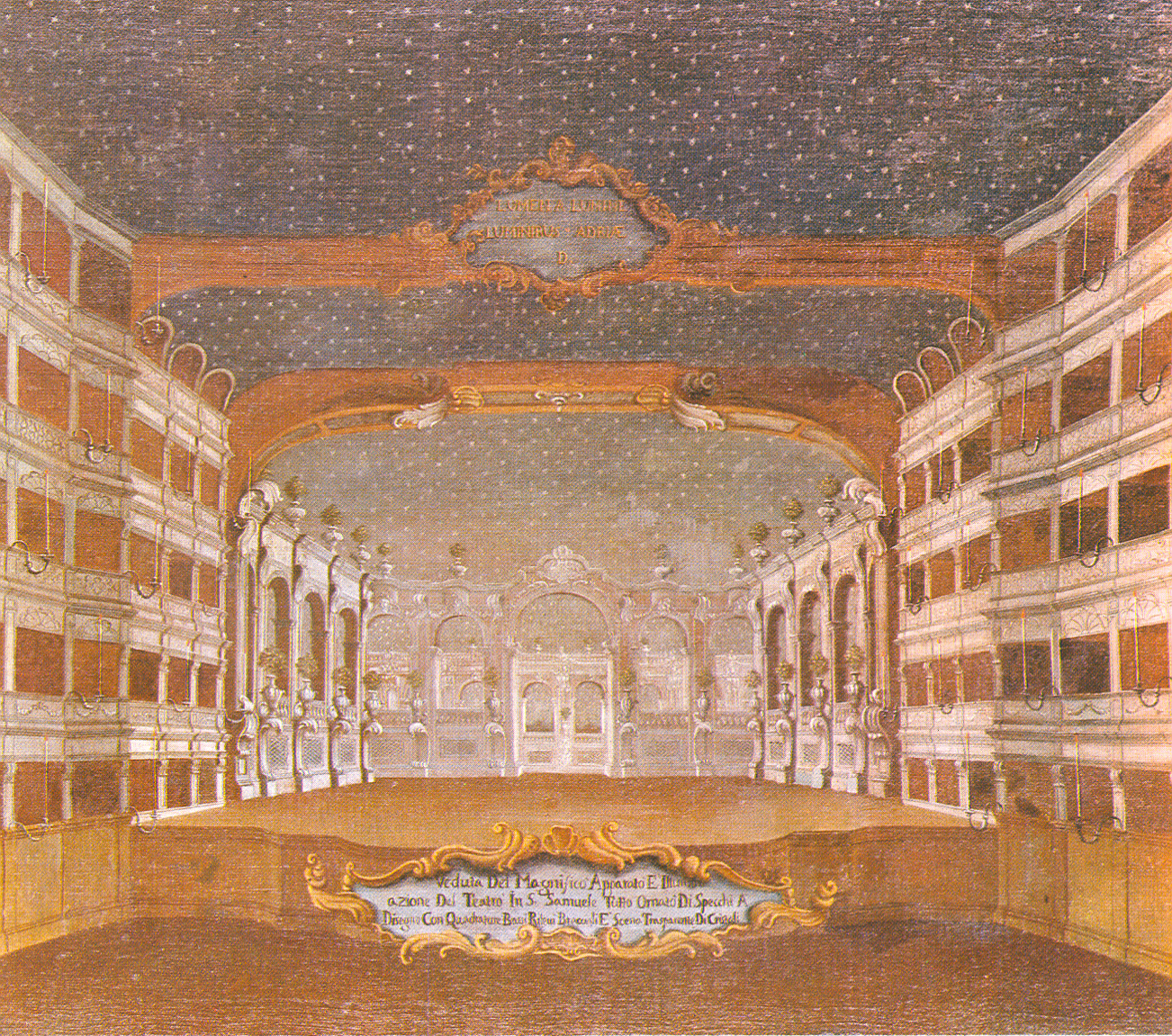
Painting of the Teatro San Samuele by Gabriel Bella (1730-1799)

Gozzi's Turandot was adapted from a tale believed to be of Persian origin and collected under the title "Histoire du prince Calaf et de la princesse de la Chine" ('Story of Prince Calaf and the Princess of China') in Les Mille et Un Jours (1710–1712) by François Pétis de la Croix, where the name of the princess of China appears as "Tourandocte". Pétis de la Croix' version had been translated to Italian as early as 1720, with the princess's name rendered as "Turandotte".

Turandot was written deliberately in the Commedia dell'arte style by Gozzi, as part of a campaign in his literary war against the bourgeois, realistic works of Pietro Chiari and Carlo Goldoni. Gozzi was intimate with the out-of-work theatre troupe of Antonio Sacchi, an inveterate commedia Truffaldino. It was first performed by Sacchi's troupe at the Teatro San Samuele in Venice on 22 January 1762, and received seven subsequent performances. The choice of theatre itself was a pointed attack on Goldoni, since he had been the theatre's director between 1737–1741. In the end, Gozzi won his literary war: according to his Memoirs, "Chiari stopped writing when he saw that his dramas ceased to take. Goldoni went to Paris, to seek his fortune there, whereof we shall be duly informed in his Memoirs."

=== Characters ===
- Turandot, princess
- Altoum, emperor of China
- Adelma, Tartar princess, favourite slave of Turandot
- Zelima, another slave of Turandot
- Schirina, mother of Zelima
- Barach, former tutor
- Calaf, prince of the Tartars
- Timur, king of Astrachan
- Pantalone, secretary of Altoum
- Tartaglia, Grand Chancellor
- Brighella, master of the pages
- Truffaldino, chief of the eunuchs
- doctors, slaves, eunuchs, soldiers, Executioner

=== Plot ===
==== Act I ====
The protagonist Calaf, a prince of Astrachan who has been deposed and exiled, takes refuge in Peking where he meets his former tutor, Barach. Barach has been posing as a Persian under the false name of Assan, has married a Chinese landlady and has had a daughter with her. The daughter's name is Zelima and she is a court slave.

Calaf tells his old tutor the vicissitudes that have followed after his loss of the throne: he escaped through the desert with his mother and with his father Timor and took refuge at the court of the king of the Carazans, but the latter enslaved them. However, the king of the Carazans was defeated by the Great Khan, Altoum. Calaf's parents then hid at the court of the king Alinguer. Calaf tried to become a soldier of the Great Khan.

In his turn, Barach tells Calaf the story of Turandot, the daughter of the Great Khan Altoum, who refuses to marry and subjects her suitors to a cruel challenge: to marry her, they must resolve three riddles posed by eight sages. If they fail, they are decapitated and their heads are placed on the city wall, which are, indeed, decorated with skulls. Calaf, who had already heard this story, is horrified to learn that it was not just a legend, as he had believed.

Meanwhile, Ismael, the tutor of the Prince of Samarkand, arrives. His pupil has just undergone the test, he has failed and has been decapitated. Before his death, the prince wanted to kiss the portrait of the princess, which Ismael in a fit of despair throws on the ground and tramples it. Calaf is spellbound by the image of the princess and decides to undergo the test, too.

Barach tries in vain to dissuade him. Calaf gives his old tutor and his mother a bag of gold coins as a bequest to give to the poor and the priests if he, too, should fail the test.

==== Act II ====
At the court of the Grand Khan Altoum, the characters of commedia dell'arte serve: Truffaldino, chief of the eunuchs who quarrels with Brighella, master of the pages; Pantalone, a Venetian who has become secretary of the court and advisor to the Khan; Tartaglia, the chancellor.

The Emperor, who has just learnt that Calaf has accepted challenged and is saddened by his likely death, discusses that with Pantalone. Calaf arrives and the Emperor and his advisors try to make him abandon his intentions, but Calaf is determined to undergo the test.

Enter the princess, accompanied by the court slave Zelima, daughter of Barach, and Adelma, the former princess and daughter of the king of the Carazans, whose slave Calaf used to be after the loss of his throne. Adelma, who was secretly in love with Calaf, immediately recognises him.

Turandot feels attraction to Calaf, but she nevertheless poses her riddles and to general surprise and jubilation Calaf manages to solve them: the sun, the year and the lion of Adria (Venice). The princess, who does not want to admit her defeat, demands a rematch challenge. The Grand Khan Altoum disagrees, but Calaf, who does not wish to marry a woman who hates him, accepts her request and challenges her to solve a riddle in turn: she must guess his name and his father's name and if she succeeds, Calaf will be executed. Altoum, however, intervenes and declares that in case Turandot succeeds, Calaf will be allowed to leave safe and sound.

==== Act III ====
Adelma, who no longer accepts being reduced to slavery despite being of royal blood, decides to defy death to escape her situation.

In the meantime, Turandot confides in the other slave Zelima: she does not accept the idea of marriage because she considers all men to be cheaters, inclined to treat women as slaves and to keep them weak and subjugated. For that reason, she wants to solve the riddle of the prince at any cost.

Adelma, who is made jealous by the imminent marriage of Calaf and is determined to prevent it, suggests to Turandot that there must be someone in Peking who knows the identity of the prince, it is just necessary to find him and reward him adequately.

Meanwhile, Calaf asks his former tutor Barach, the only person who knows his real identity, to keep the secret. Brighella, Pantalone and Tartaglia arrive and unsuccessfully attempt to make Calaf talk. The old Timur, Calaf's father, sees his son convoyed by soldiers and calls him by name. Barach begs him to be silent and tells him to maintain secrecy about their identity. However, it turns out that Barach's wife has incautiously mentioned in the palace the fact that Calaf has been lodging in their house. Barach is horrified, realising that Turandot will probably try to force them to disclose Calaf's identity. He tries to organise an escape, but Truffaldino's eunuchs arrest them.

==== Act IV ====
Timur, Barach and his family are brought before Turandot, who has given orders to torture them. The two try to resist, but the old Timur lets the word 'son' slip out. Turandot then understands that she is facing a king, the father of her suitor, and frees him, giving orders to torture Barach in his place.

Adelma asks Turandot to send her to Calaf, promising to make him reveal his name, but she says that she needs Barach's wife, his daughter Zelima and gold in order to bribe the guards. Turandot accepts.

The Grand Khan Altoum has found out Calaf and Timur's identity and offers Turandot to reveal them to her and to let her win the challenge, but under the condition that she will nevertheless marry Calaf afterwards. Turandot refuses, hoping that Adelma's plans will succeed. The Khan gets angry and leaves.

Brighella warns Calaf that he might be visited by "ghosts" trying to steal his secret. Attempts to make Calaf talk do indeed follow. Barach's wife, disguised as a soldier, claims that his father is in the palace and offers to deliver a signed message from Calaf. Zelima tells him that Turandot is actually in love with him but would marry him only if his real name is revealed to her. Truffaldino tries to use the alleged magical powers of a mandrake to make Calaf talk in his sleep. All of these attempts fail.

Finally Adelma arrives, wakes up Calaf and reveals to him that she is the daughter of the king of the Carazans, telling him the sad story of her family: her mother and sisters were drowned after the defeat, and a brother, who was a suitor of Turandot as well, was decapitated after failing to solve the riddles. Adelma then lies that Turandot intends to have him killed before dawn. Calaf, struck by Adelma's story, believes her and, in his despair, exclaims his name and that of his father. Adelma then offers him to flee quickly together and to try to reconquer her father's lost throne. However, Calaf is determined to marry Turandot and refuses the proposal.

At dawn Brighella arrives to pick up Calaf and take him to the princess. Calaf, due to what Adelma told him, is convinced that he is going to his death.

==== Act V ====
As they arrive at the palace, Turandot, to everyone's surprise, publicly declares Calaf's name. Adelma has revealed to her the prince's identity in a last attempt to prevent the wedding. Turandot tells Calaf to go away and seek another spouse. Calaf, desperate, tries to commit suicide with a dagger. However, Turandot is touched (in addition to finding him beautiful), so she prevents him from committing suicide and declares that she has decided to marry him.

Adelma, in turn, having lost her hope to escape with Calaf, openly reveals to everyone her own acts and motives and tries to commit suicide with the knife that he has dropped, but is, in turn, prevented from doing so by Calaf. Calaf and Turandot offer her back her freedom, and Altoum in addition gives her back her kingdom.

Altoum reveals to Calaf that the usurper of his father's throne has been deposed by their former vassals, and that the power in their kingdom is held by a faithful minister of Timur, who has sent messages asking for Timor or Calaf to come back and reascend the throne.

Turandot notes the selfless and noble behaviour exhibited by men that she has seen in the course of the story, as well as Adelma's betrayal, and concludes that she was wrong to hate men. She asks all men for forgiveness and beseeches them to give her some sign that they have forgiven her.

== Other versions ==
=== Friedrich Werthes ===
The poet and playwright Friedrich Werthes (Buttenhausen, 12 October 1748–Stuttgart, 5 December 1817) made a translation of Gozzi's complete plays, employing prose rather than verse for the characters' lines. Schiller's Turandot (see below) is partly based on Werthes' version.

=== Friedrich Schiller ===
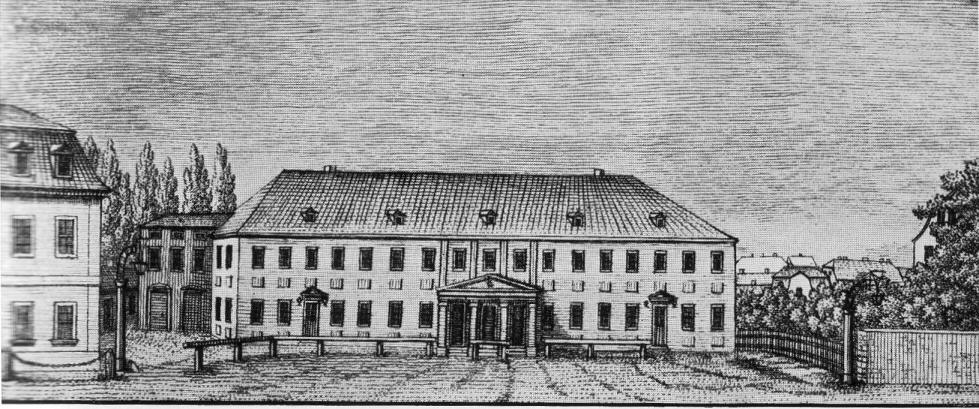
The old Weimar Hoftheater in 1800

In 1801 Friedrich Schiller translated Gozzi's Commedia dell'arte play, at the same time re-interpreting it in the Romantic style.

It was first produced in 1802 by at the 'old' Weimar Hoftheater by Johann von Goethe, who had been the theatre's director since its inception in 1791. Schiller had begun a collaborative friendship with Goethe in 1794 which lasted until Schiller's death in 1805, after which Goethe forsook ballads and turned to the completion of Part one of Faust.

Comparison of Gozzi's and Schiller's versions

Gozzi's play has a "light, sarcastic tone" whereas Schiller transforms it into a symbolic epic with an idealised moral attitude. Gozzi, although he also uses both elements of drama and comedy, puts them side by side as independent parts; Schiller combines them and makes them the result of each other. This interaction of dramatic and comical, their interdependence and the fact of their being equally matched, embodies the Romantic principle of universalism.

Gozzi's main character, the princess Turandot, seems to act out of a mood and cruelty whereas Schiller's Turandot is a person who resolutely follows her moral and ethical attitude. Also Prince Calaf, who is a kind of lost soul and philanderer in Gozzi's version, becomes a kind lover who surrenders to his deep and true love for Turandot.

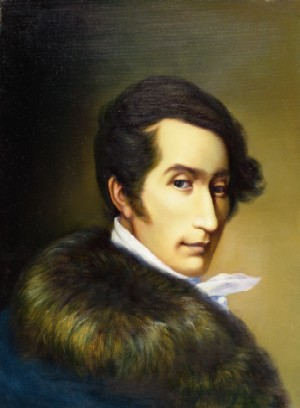
Carl Maria von Weber

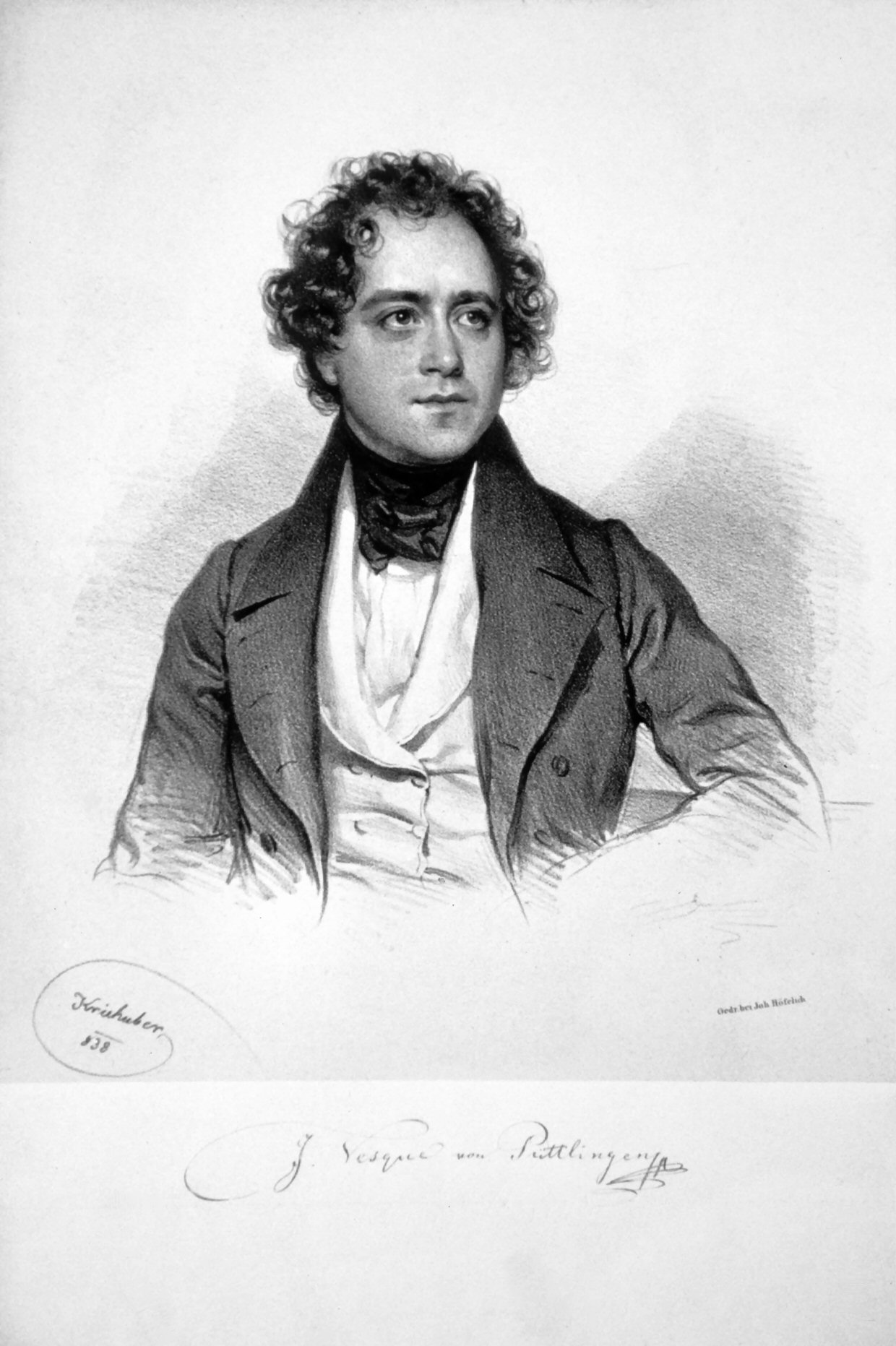
Johann Vesque von Püttlingen

The classical commedia dell’arte characters in the play, especially Pantalone and Brighella, whose language is rather colloquial in Gozzi's version, lose their naïve nature and even speak in well-formed verses in Schiller's work; they also contribute to the more severe and moralistic atmosphere in Schiller's adaptation.

=== Carl Maria von Weber ===
Carl Maria von Weber based his 1805 Chinese Ouverture on a Chinese theme found in Jean-Jacques Rousseau's Dictionnaire de musique. Weber's friend, the composer Franz Danzi, was employed as Kapellmeister in the Stuttgart court of King Frederick I of Württemberg, and when Weber obtained a non-musical position as the private secretary of the King's brother, Duke Ludwig, Danzi encouraged Weber to write some music for a performance of Schiller's play at the court theatre. The result was his 1809 Incidental music for Turandot, J.37 which incorporated the Chinese Ouverture.

=== Franz Danzi ===
Franz Danzi later wrote his own singspiel Turandot based on Schiller in 1816, which was performed in Karlsruhe in 1817.

=== 'J. Hoven' ===
The lawyer and composer Johann Vesque von Püttlingen was a friend of Franz Schubert and Felix Mendelssohn. Born in the Lubomirski Palace, near Lublin, West Galicia, he grew up in Vienna and trained as a lawyer, rising to section director in the Austrian Foreign Ministry under Metternich. Under the pseudonym 'J. Hoven' (after Ludwig van Beethoven) he composed over 300 songs and 8 operas, among which was Turandot, Princess of Shiraz, libretto after Schiller, first performed on 3 October 1838.

=== Andrea Maffei ===
Schiller's play was re-translated into Italian by his friend Andrea Maffei in 1863.

=== Antonio Bazzini ===
Antonio Bazzini's opera Turanda, with a libretto by Antonio Gazzoletti, was first performed at La Scala, Milan, 13 January 1867. Bazzini later taught composition to Giacomo Puccini and Pietro Mascagni at the Milan Conservatory.

=== Mary Sabilla Novello ===
A free English translation from Schiller by Mary Sabilla Novello was published in 1872. Novello's adaptation is shorter and resuscitates, to a certain degree, the frivolous and decadent tone of Schiller's source; for example, Tartaglia is a source of comic relief, as he is in Gozzi's play, and at the end of the play the cast breaks out into a dance that is designed in part to provoke laughter from the audience, as opposed to enacting the solemn, dramatic denouement found in the original German text.

=== Busoni Turandot Suite ===
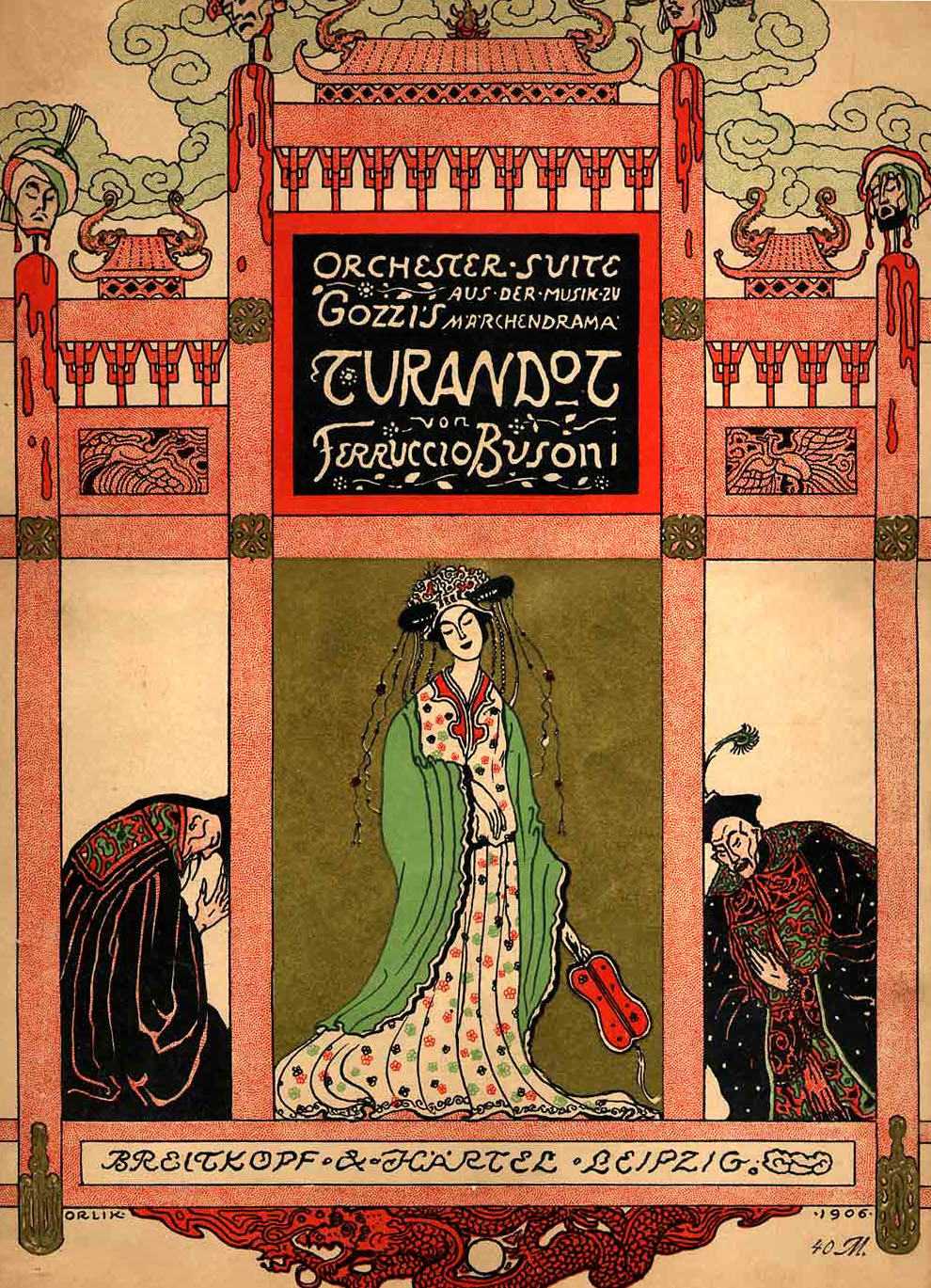
Score of Busoni's Turandot Suite, cover designed by Emil Orlík, first published in 1906.

After reading Gozzi's play, Ferruccio Busoni began sketching out some incidental music to accompany it (1904-1905). He swiftly expanded the sketches into the Turandot Suite, first performance 21 October 1905, published in 1906. Busoni added a further movement to the Suite in 1911 for the play's first Berlin production (see below), and substituted another in 1917 after completing his opera on the same subject.

=== Karl Vollmoeller/Max Reinhardt production - Berlin ===
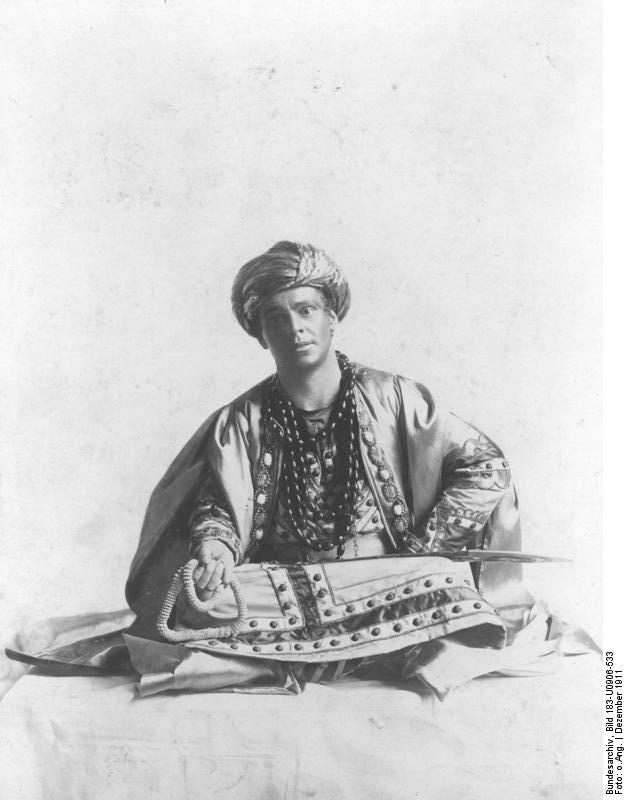
Alexander Moissi as Prince Calaf in Reinhardt's production of Turandot, Deutsches Theater, Berlin, December 1911

After completing his Turandot Suite Busoni approached Max Reinhardt in late 1906 about staging a production of Gozzi's play with Busoni's music. His idea eventually came to fruition four years later at the Deutsches Theater, Berlin in 1911, in a production by Reinhardt. Karl Vollmoeller provided a German translation of Gozzi's play, dedicated to Busoni; the sets were by Ernst Stern. The incidental music (probably the published Turandot Suite with the additional number) was played by a full symphony orchestra conducted by Oskar Fried.

=== Max Reinhardt production - London ===
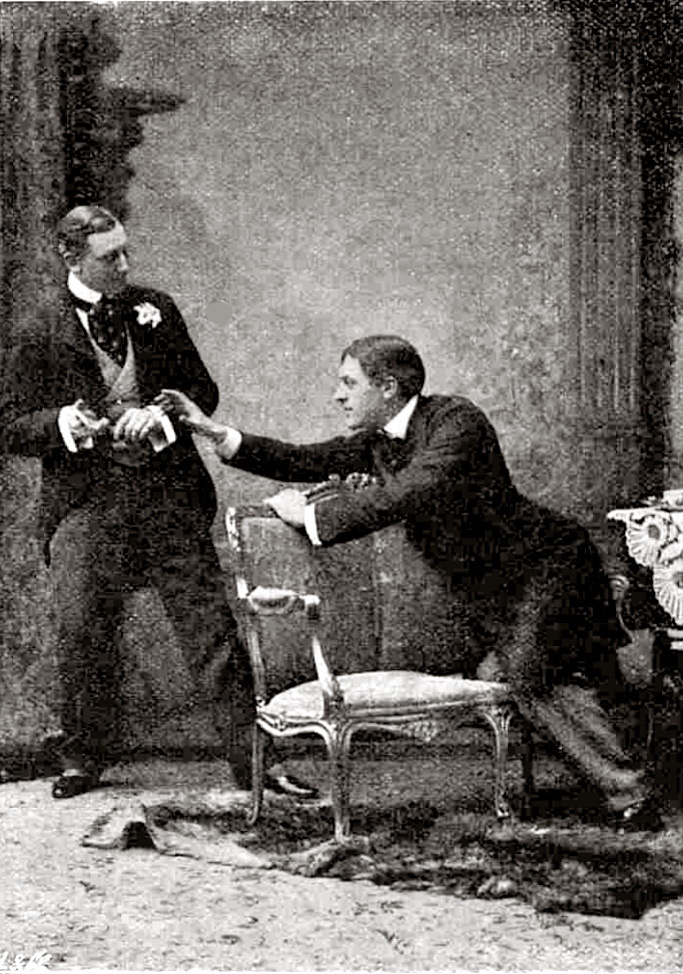
Sir George Alexander (r.) in The Importance of being Earnest with Allan Aynesworth

Reinhardt's Berlin production was brought to London in 1913 by the actor-manager and impresario Sir George Alexander. Vollmoeller's 1911 translation of Gozzi was re-translated into English by Jethro Bithell (1878-1962). A pupil of Busoni's, Johan Wijsman, made an unauthorised reduced orchestration of Busoni's score (and added music by other composers).

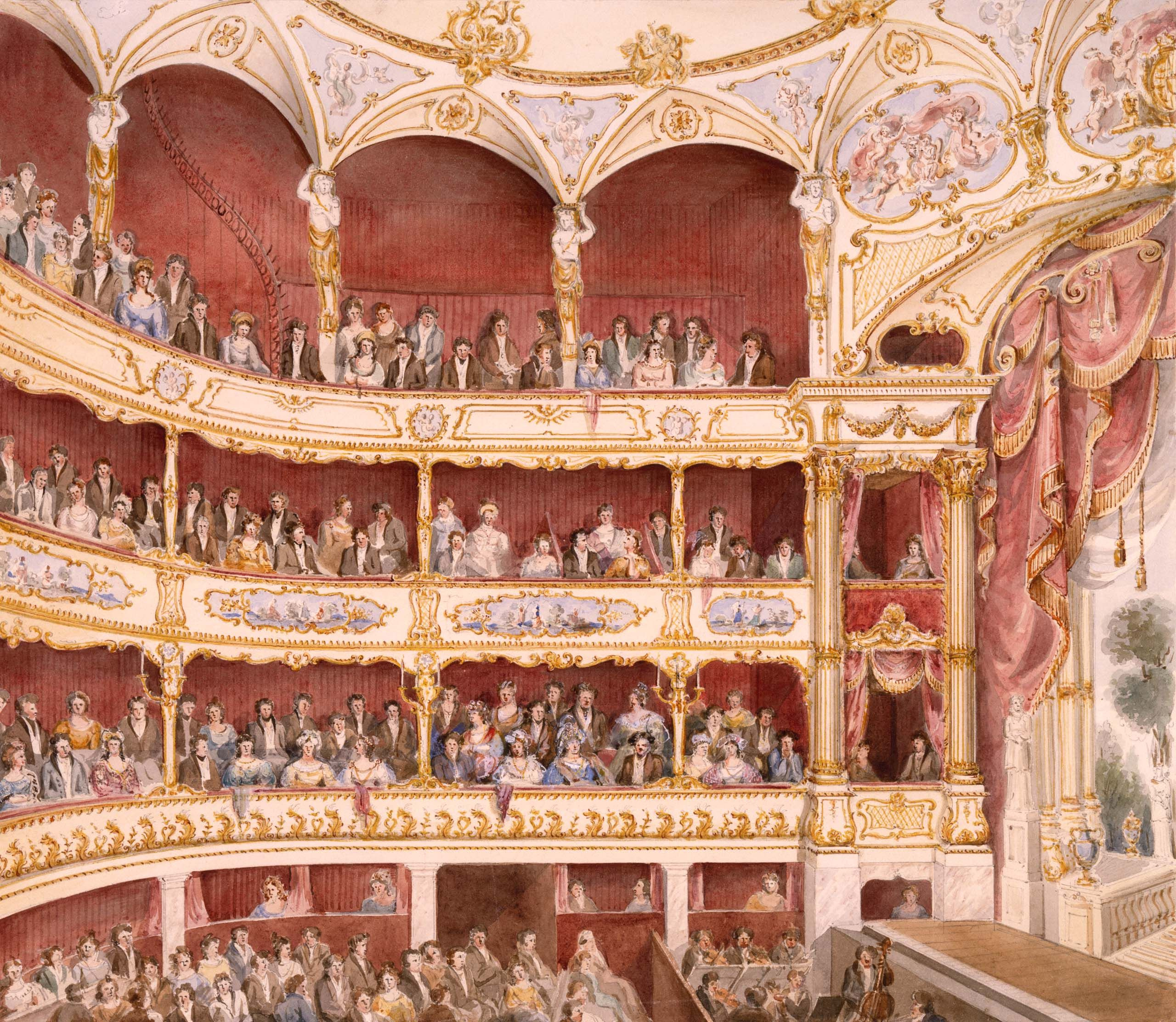
Interior of St. James's Theatre

Cast of the play as produced at the St. James's Theatre, London, on 18 January 1913, under the management of Sir George Alexander.

- Turandot: Evelyn D'Alroy
- Altoum: J. H. Barnes
- Adelma: Hilda Moore
- Zelima: Maire O'Neill
- Skirina: Margaret Yarde
- Barak: Alfred Harris
- Calaf: Godfrey Tearle
- Ishmael: James Berry
- Pantalone: Edward Sass
- Tartaglia: E. Vivian Reynolds
- Brigella: Fred Lewis
- Truffaldino: Norman Forbes
- Prince of Samarkand: Austin Fehrman

=== Vollmoeller/J.C. Huffmann ===
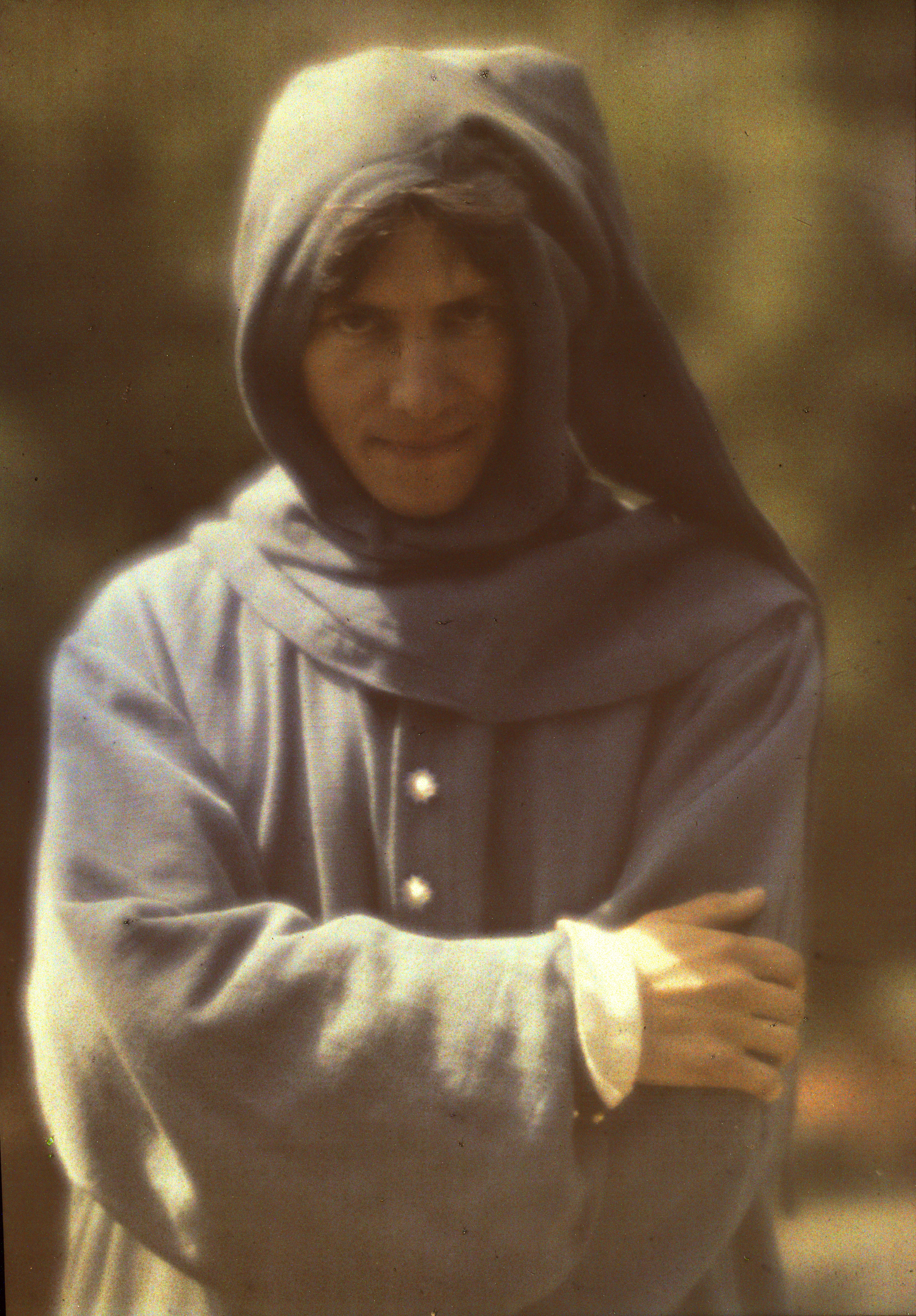
Percy MacKaye as Alwyn the poet in MacKaye's play Sanctuary: A Bird Masque. Autochrome (1913) by Arnold Genthe.

Vollmoeller's play was produced in the USA by the Shuberts at the Hyperion Theatre, New Haven, Connecticut, on 31 December 1912. (Note: The previous show at the Hyperion was a film called The Miracle: a legend of medieval times. This German film (original title: Das Mirakel) was an unauthorised version of another work by Karl Vollmoeller, The Miracle (play) which had played at Olympia, London in a spectacular production by Max Reinhardt. The 'genuine' film of the production, The Miracle (1912 film) by Joseph Menchen was first shown in the US on 17 February 1913 at the Park Theatre, New York.) The producer was J. C. Huffmann, whose production designs were influenced by Reinhardt's. The cast included Emily Stevens, Josephine Victor, Alice Martin, Margaret Greville, Frank Peters, Pedro de Cordova (José Luis Medrano), Edward Emery (see Florence Farr and John Emery), Lennox Pawle, Daniel Gilfeather, Anthony Andre and 20 others. Incidental music by Oscar Racin. According to a New York Times report, the Vollmoeller script arrived without scenes or acts being designated, and was tidied up by Huffmann; however, the play was not a success.

=== Percy MacKaye/J. C. Huffmann ===
In the wake of the failure of Vollmoeller's play at the Hyperion Theatre, Lee Shubert asked Percy MacKaye to revise Turandot for American audiences. In the end MacKaye wrote a new work, A Thousand Years Ago, which was presented a year later at the Shubert Theatre on 1 December 1913. The production re-used Huffmann's earlier set designs and incorporated the ideas of Reinhardt and Edward Gordon Craig. It transferred to the Lyric Theatre (New York) in January 1914.

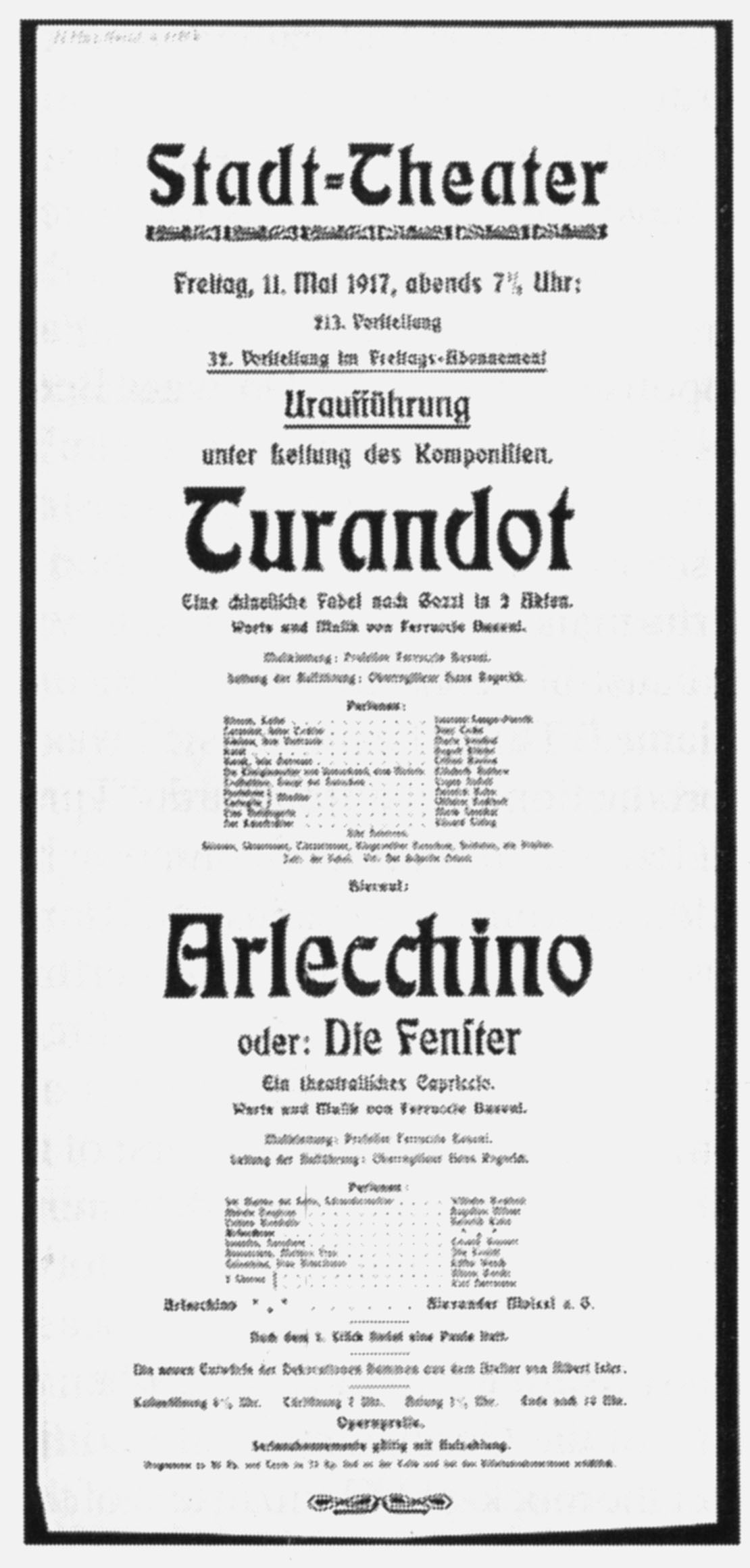
Poster for the premiere of Busoni's Turandot.

=== Busoni Turandot opera ===
Busoni's opera Turandot was based on the music of his earlier orchestral Turandot Suite; he wrote his own libretto, also possibly using the translation which Karl Vollmoeller had made for the 1911 Reinhardt production. The opera was first performed in the Stadttheater, Zürich (now the Zürich Opera House) 11 May 1917.

=== Wilhelm Stenhammar ===
Wilhelm Stenhammar wrote his Musik till Carlo Gozzis skådepel "Turandot" (Music for Gozzi's spectacle "Turandot"), Op. 42 (1920) for flute, clarinet, bassoon and percussion (triangle, cymbals, bass drum and tamtam), as incidental music for a (Swedish?) production of the Gozzi play. See also § External links below.

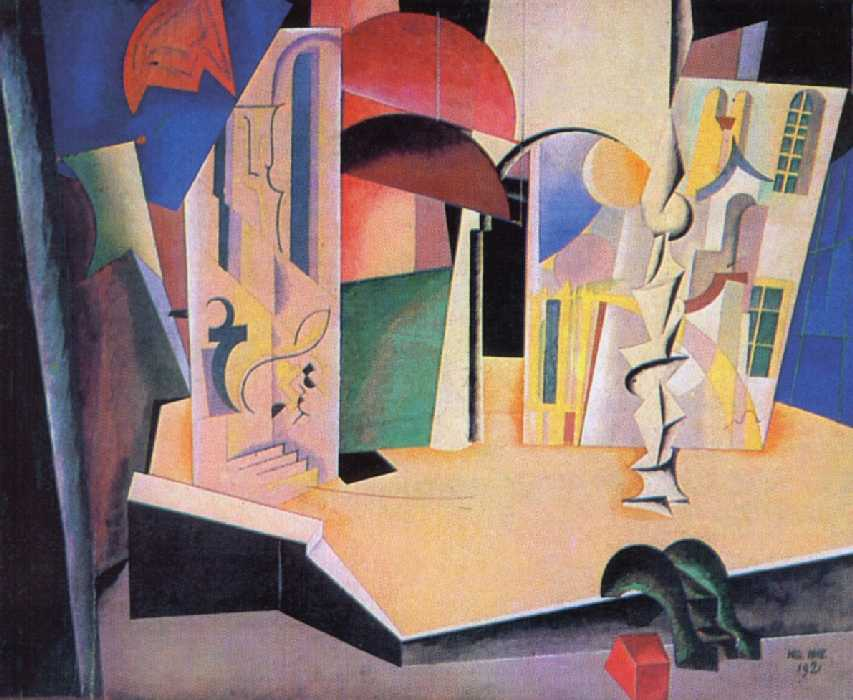
I. Nivinskiy: set design for Vakhtangov's Princess Turandot (1922)

=== Yevgeny Vakhtangov - Moscow ===
Yevgeny Vakhtangov staged a highly acclaimed avant-garde performance of Gozzi's play in Moscow in 1921.

=== Provincetown Playhouse production ===
Isaac Don Levine and Henry Alsberg translated and adapted Turandot to open the 1926 season at the Provincetown Playhouse in New York.

=== Puccini Turandot opera ===
Giacomo Puccini said in a letter that "...Turandot is the most normal and human play in all Gozzi." The libretto for his (unfinished) opera Turandot (1920-1924) is by Adami and Simoni. Apart from Gozzi's original they used Andrea Maffei's Italian translation of Schiller's German version. They also made reference to the libretto by Gazzoletti for Antonio Bazzini's Turanda. Although Puccini had heard reports about Busoni's opera, he didn't see it himself.

=== Princess Turandot (1934 film) ===
Prinzessin Turandot is a German black-and-white sound film made in 1934. It was directed by Gerhard Lamprecht with a script by Thea von Harbou, and starred Käthe von Nagy as Turandot and Willy Fritsch as Prince Calaf, the Birdseller. The film includes the song Turandot, bezaubernde Turandot by Franz Doelle and Bruno Balz (recorded by Herbert Ernst Groh in 1935).

=== Havergal Brian ===
Havergal Brian based the libretto of his opera Turandot (1949-1951) on Schiller's play. Like Busoni, Brian also wrote an associated orchestral Turandot Suite. Brian composed his Turandot between his 8th and 9th Symphonies. In a letter, he wrote: "Turandot. I have not seen any music of the work by Busoni or Puccini.... My reason for tackling 'Turandot' was that I read a German translation and enjoyed it so much that I started work on it as an Opera."

=== Bertolt Brecht ===
Bertolt Brecht also made his own adaptation of Gozzi's play, Turandot, or the Whitewashers' Congress (1953–1954). Brecht's library contained a 1925 edition of Vollmoeller's translation. Brecht's epic comedy was first performed (posthumously) in Zurich (the same city as the premiere of Busoni's opera), in the Schauspielhaus on 5 February 1969.

=== Contemporary Chinese theatre ===
Turandot has been recently rewritten and interpreted in different forms of Chinese xìqǔ (literally, 'theater of song'), often referred to as Chinese opera.

== See also ==
- Crystal Turandot Award, a Russian theatre award
- The Curse of Turandot, 2021 Chinese film, loosely based on Gozzi's play
- Princess Turandot (disambiguation)
