= Histoire des Ouvrages des Savans =

Histoire des Ouvrages des Savans was a scholarly journal edited by Henri Basnage de Beauval and published by Reinier Leers, starting in September 1687. It was styled after the journal, Nouvelles de la république des lettres, which had been edited by Pierre Bayle, whose health had failed in that year.
