= Paul Sebag =

French sociologist and historian

- Born: 26 September 1919; Tunis
- Died: 5 September 2004 (aged 84); Paris
- Awards: Tunisian Order of Cultural Merit

Academic work
- Discipline: sociology and history
- Institutions: Lycée Carnot; University of Rouen
- Main interests: history of Tunis and Tunisian Jews

Paul Sebag (Tunisian Arabic: پول صباغ) (26 September 1919 – 5 September 2004) was a French-Tunisian sociologist and historian.

== Biography ==
After his studies in law and philosophy in Paris were interrupted by World War II and the anti-Jewish laws of the Vichy regime, Paul Sebag returned to Tunisia and took an important part in the action of the Tunisian Communist Party (PCT) against the partisans of Vichy. Arrested and tortured, he was sentenced by a Bizerte court for life, but spent only ten months in prison. Released in the aftermath of the Allies' landings in North Africa on 8 November 1942, he resumed his political activity in the PCT illegally.

In 1943, after the Liberation, he became a journalist and edited the party newspaper. He then completed his studies and became, from 1947 to 1957, professor of letters at Lycée Carnot in Tunis. He also published several studies in urban sociology that led him to teach at the Institute of Advanced Studies of Tunis and the Faculty of Humanities and Social Sciences of Tunis. In 1977, due to the non-renewal of his contract by the Tunisian authorities, he obtained a job at the University of Rouen, where he worked for two years before retiring. He devoted himself to his work as a historian and published on the history of Tunis and the Tunisian Jews.

In 1994, he was awarded the Tunisian Order of Cultural Merit.

A volume of posthumous homages is published in his honor in 2008.

== Main publications ==
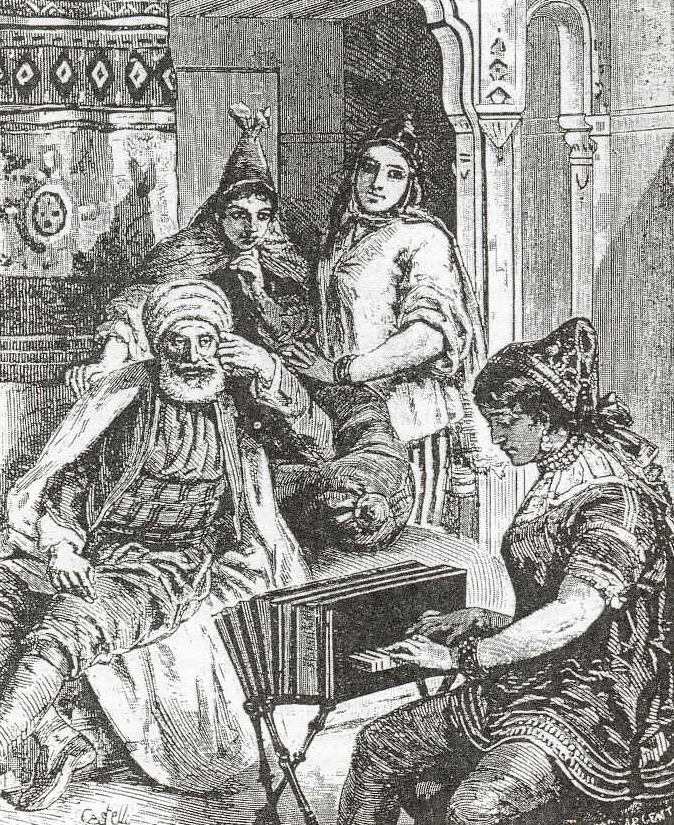
Saturday night in a Jewish family in Tunis (1884) from his book Histoire des Juifs de Tunisie.

=== Personal works ===
- La Tunisie. La culture et les hommes (in French). Paris: Éditions sociales. 1951. p. 237.
- Tunis au XVIè siècle: Une cité barbaresque au temps de la course. Histoire et perspectives méditerranéennes (in French). Paris: L'Harmattan. 1989. p. 267. ISBN 2-7384-0449-9.
- Histoire des Juifs de Tunisie. Histoire et perspectives méditerranéennes (in French). Paris: L'Harmattan. 1991. p. 335. ISBN 2-7384-1027-8.
- Tunis. Histoire et perspectives méditerranéennes (in French). Paris: L'Harmattan. 1998. p. 685. ISBN 2-7384-6610-9.
- Communistes de Tunisie, 1939-1943 (in French). Paris: L'Harmattan. 2001. p. 187. ISBN 2-7475-0888-9.
- La course tunisienne au XVIè siècle. Publications de l'Institut des belles lettres arabes (in French). Tunis: Institut des belles lettres arabes. 2001. p. 74.
- Les noms des Juifs de Tunisie (in French). Paris: L'Harmattan. 2002. p. 171. ISBN 2-7475-2595-3.

=== Collaborative works ===
- Paul Sebag; Tawhida Benzina-Ben Cheikh; M. Lahmi; B. Lazar; J. Lévigne; H. Nizard; Jean Poncet; M. Turki; Georges Valensi (1956). Enquête sur les salariés de la région de Tunis. Publications de l'université de Tunis. Mémoires du Centre d'études de sciences humaines (in French). Paris: Presses universitaires de France. p. 79.
- Paul Sebag; Robert Attal (1959). La hara de Tunis. Publications de l'Institut des hautes études de Tunis. Mémoires du Centre d'études de sciences humaines (in French). Paris: Presses universitaires de France. p. 92.
- Paul Sebag; Jean Claudian; Mustapha Ben Salem; Hannah Taïeb (1960). Un faubourg de Tunis. Publications de l'université de Tunis. Mémoires du Centre d'études de sciences humaines (in French). Paris: Presses universitaires de France. p. 90.
- Claude Roy; Paul Sebag (1961). Tunisie. Neuf (in French). Paris: Delpire. p. 160.
- Paul Sebag (1963). La Grande Mosquée de Kairouan. Le génie du lieu (in French). Paris: Delpire. p. 123.
- Pierre Grandchamp (1966). Études d'histoire tunisienne. Publications de l'université de Tunis. Histoire (in French). Paris: Presses universitaires de France. p. 200.
- Paul Sebag; Abdelwahab Bouhdiba; Carmel Camilleri (1968). Les préconditions sociales de l'industrialisation dans la région de Tunis. Cahiers du CERES. Série sociologique (in French). Tunis: Centre d'études et de recherches économiques et sociales. p. 191.
- Paul Sebag (1968). Toute la Tunisie (in French). Tunis: Cérès Productions. p. 111.
- Jean-Pierre Allali; Annie Goldmann; Paul Sebag (1989). Les Juifs de Tunisie (in French). Paris: Éditions du Scribe. p. 263. ISBN 2-86765-011-9.

=== Text editions ===
- Une relation inédite sur la prise de Tunis par les Turcs en 1574. Sources de l'histoire tunisienne (in French). Tunis: Publications de l'Université de Tunis. 1971. p. 248.
- François Pétis de La Croix (1981). Les Mille et un jours (in French). Paris: Christian Bourgois. p. 520. ISBN 2-267-00246-9.
- Nicolas Béranger (1993). La régence de Tunis à la fin du XVIè siècle. Histoire et perspectives méditerranéennes (in French). Paris: L'Harmattan. p. 167. ISBN 2-7384-1863-5.
- François Pétis de La Croix (2000). Histoire du prince Calaf et de la princesse de la Chine (in French). Paris: L'Harmattan. p. 149. ISBN 2-7384-8817-X.
- François Pétis de La Croix (2003). Les Mille et un jours (in French). Paris: Phébus. p. 670. ISBN 2-85940-899-1.
- Une histoire des révolutions du royaume de Tunis au XVIè siècle. Histoire et perspectives méditerranéennes (in French). Paris: L'Harmattan. 2003. p. 202. ISBN 2-74755-532-1.
