= Dominant ideology =

Concept in Marxist philosophy

In Marxist philosophy, the dominant ideology is the attitudes, beliefs, values, and morals shared by the majority of the people in a given society. As a mechanism of social control, the dominant ideology frames how the majority of the population thinks about the nature of society, their place in society, and their connection to a social class.

In The German Ideology (1845), Karl Marx and Friedrich Engels said that "The ideas of the ruling class are, in any age, the ruling ideas" applied to every social class in service to the interests of the ruling class. In revolutionary praxis, the slogan: "The dominant ideology is the ideology of the dominant class" summarises ideology's function as a basis for revolution.

In a capitalist, bourgeois society, Marxist revolutionary praxis seeks to achieve the social and political circumstances that render the ruling class as politically illegitimate, as such, it is requisite for the successful deposition of the capitalist system of production. Then, the ideology of the working class achieves and establishes social, political, and economic dominance, so that the proletariat (the urban working class and the peasantry) can assume power (political and economic) as the dominant class of the society.

In non-Marxist theory, the dominant ideology means the values, beliefs, and morals shared by the social majority, which frames how most of the populace think about their society, and so, to the extent that it does, it may or may not serve the interests of the ruling class; therefore, the extent to which a dominant ideology effectively dominates collective societal thought may or may not have declined during the modern era.

== Before Marxism ==
Social control exercised and effected by means of the ideological manipulation of aspects of the common culture of a society—religion and politics, culture and economy, etc.—to explain and justify the status quo to the political advantage of the dominant (ruling) class dates from the Age of Enlightenment, in the 18th century.

Such a method of social control conceptually derived from the Noble Lie, proposed by Plato, which was required for the social stability of a republic composed of three social classes. In Book 3 (414e–15c) of The Republic, Plato presents the Noble Lie (gennaion pseudos, γενναῖον ψεῦδος) in a fictional tale, wherein Socrates establishes and justifies the origin of the socially stratified society:

... the earth, as being their mother, delivered them, and now, as if their land were their mother and their nurse, they ought to take thought for her and defend her against any attack, and regard the other citizens as their brothers and children of the self-same earth... While all of you, in the city, are brothers, we will say in our tale, yet god, in fashioning those of you who are fitted to hold rule, mingled gold in their generation, for which reason they are the most precious—but in the helpers, silver, and iron and brass in the farmers and other craftsmen.

And, as you are all akin, though for the most part you will breed after your kinds, it may sometimes happen that a golden father would beget a silver son, and that a golden offspring would come from a silver sire, and that the rest would, in like manner, be born of one another. So that the first and chief injunction that the god lays upon the rulers is that of nothing else are they to be such careful guardians, and so intently observant as of the intermixture of these metals in the souls of their offspring, and if sons are born to them with an infusion of brass or iron they shall by no means give way to pity in their treatment of them, but shall assign to each the status due to his nature and thrust them out among the artisans or the farmers.

And again, if from these there is born a son with unexpected gold or silver in his composition they shall honor such and bid them go up higher, some to the office of guardian, some to the assistanceship, alleging that there is an oracle that the city shall then be overthrown when the man of iron or brass is its guardian.

== Marxism ==
By the nineteenth century, Karl Marx described such ruling-class cultural hegemony with the term dominant ideology, which described the societal status quo (religious and political, economic and cultural) that characterised the capitalism of the nineteenth century. As such, Marxist philosophy proposes two conceptual models, the Intentional and the Spontaneous, to characterise the social function(s) of the dominant ideology:

(i) Intentional

Ideology is deliberately constructed by bourgeois and petit-bourgeois intellectuals, which then is propagated by the mass communications media (print, radio, television, cinema, Internet). Hence, because the bourgeoisie own the communications media, as a social class, they can select, determine, and publish the economic, social, and cultural concepts that constitute the established status quo, which are the ideology (formal doctrines) that serves their interests as the ruling class of the society.

Moreover, because the working class own no mass communications media, they are overwhelmed by the bourgeoisie′s cultural hegemony, and, because they have no intellectuals of their own, they adopt the imposed bourgeois worldview (Weltanschauung), which thus constitutes a false consciousness about their own economic exploitation by the strata of the upper classes; with that false awareness the working class lose their social and political, economic and cultural independence as a social class.

(ii) Spontaneous

Ideology spontaneously originates in every social class of a society, as an expression of the existing material structure of the given society. Based upon their experiences of societal life, the men and women of each social class (upper, middle, lower) construct their intellectual understanding of the society, and, because their societal experiences are primarily of capitalist social relations, the shared (dominant) ideology tends to reflect the norms of a capitalist society. Hence, the content of the reportage of a newspaper is determined, not by the socio-economic and political prejudices of the publisher, but by the societal status quo, the fixed social narrative that is believed by the publisher and by the readers of the newspaper.

In organising as trade unions, the working class experience and express a different type of social relation within a capitalist society, because such an ideological perspective challenges the intellectual and social legitimacy of capitalism, by questioning the validity of how society is organised, and thus how it functions. The successful establishment of a working-class ideology (worldview) represents a collective approach to perceiving and resolving the socio-economic, political, and cultural problems of working-class people. Therefore, by means of such an embryonic class consciousness, a new material structure, within a capitalist society, becomes the base of a new ideology that expresses the interests of workers—and contradicts the status quo of the bourgeois cultural hegemony proposed and established by the dominant ideology of the capitalist ruling class.

In Marxist theory, one of the social classes of a society becomes the ruling class when they are a socially progressive force sufficiently powerful, with popular support of the other social classes, to overthrow the previous ruling class. For example, the great bourgeois revolutions of the 17th and 18th centuries occurred because the bourgeoisie had become the standard-bearer for social progress, the universal class. The bourgeoisie gradually began to lose its progressive character and became increasingly reactionary once it came to power (since it began to support the status quo rather than seek further social progress).

As a consequence, the dominant ideology may contain a mixture of socially progressive and regressive elements. Therefore, Marxists do not reject everything and anything related to the dominant ideology of capitalism; rather, they agree with its progressive elements and criticise its regressive elements. In other words, Marxist critiques of the dominant ideology of capitalism are not normally crude rejections of their content, but rather of their limiting, capitalist form.

== See also ==
- Cultural hegemony
- False consciousness
- Framing (social sciences)
- Ideocracy
- Tui (intellectual)
