= Reinier Leers =

Dutch publisher (1654–1714)

Reinier Leers (1654–1714) was a Dutch publisher in Rotterdam. His works included the journal Histoire des Ouvrages des Savans.
