= Antoine Furetière =

French writer and scholar (1619–1688)

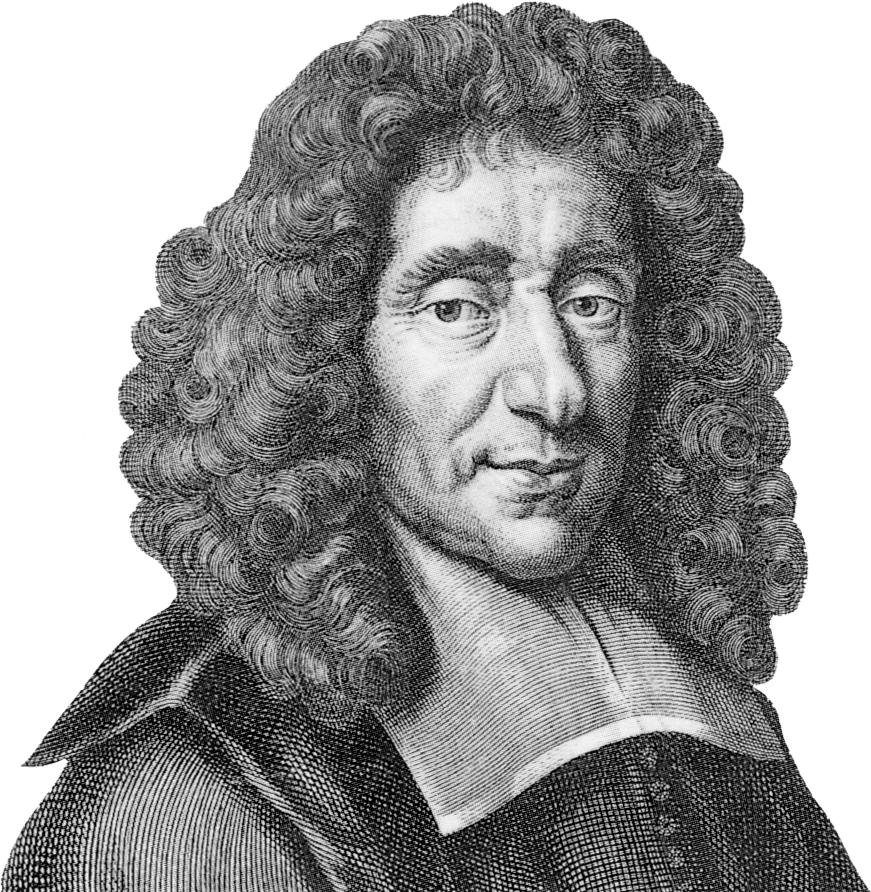
- Born: 28 December 1619; Paris, France
- Died: 14 May 1688 (aged 68)
- Occupations: Scholar, writer, Catholic clergyman

Antoine Furetière (28 December 1619 – 14 May 1688) was a French scholar, writer, and lexicographer, known best for his satirical novel Le Roman bourgeois, and also for his famous Dictionnaire universel. The Académie Française charged him with lexicographic plagiarism and ousted him for seeking to publish his own French language dictionary.

== Biography ==
=== Early life ===
Furetière was born in Paris, the son of an employee of the royal household. He studied law and worked for a time as an attorney and tax assessor. Later he became a Catholic clergyman and, after various promotions, the abbé of Chalivoy in the diocese of Bourges in 1662. Thanks to the leisure he enjoyed as a clergyman, he was able to devote himself to writing.

=== Career ===
He was admitted to the Académie Française in 1662 by virtue of his satire Nouvelle allégorique, ou histoire des derniers troubles arrivés au royaume d'éloquence (1658), among other works.

Portrait of Antoine Furetière at the Musée Carnavalet in Paris

One of Furetière's most important literary works was Le Roman bourgeois (1666). This satirical novel described everyday life, especially within the legal profession, and ridiculed the fashionable romances of Madeleine de Scudéry and of Gauthier de Costes, seigneur de la Calprenède. Because of its similarity to Paul Scarron's Le Roman comique (1651, 1657), it was translated into English as Scarron's City Romance in 1671. With a self-conscious narrator who comments on his techniques and disregards the conventions of the novel, it anticipates Laurence Sterne's Tristram Shandy (1759–1767).

==== French dictionary project ====
At its founding, the Académie Française had been entrusted with the task of producing a complete dictionary of the French language. Furetière initially participated in the collaborative project with enthusiasm, but eventually grew frustrated with his colleagues' approach and slow progress and began work on his own dictionary, probably around 1676–1678. When members of the academy heard that Furetière was about to publish his dictionary, they interfered, alleging that he had stolen their material and violated the monopoly they had held on French dictionaries since 1672. In 1685, after fierce recrimination on both sides, Furetière was expelled from the academy, and the French government revoked his permission to publish the dictionary. In 1690, Furetière's Dictionaire universel was published posthumously in the Netherlands with a Preface prepared by his friend Pierre Bayle.
