= Don Quixote (disambiguation) =

Don Quixote, fully El ingenioso hidalgo Don Quijote de la Mancha, is a classic novel by Miguel de Cervantes Saavedra, originally published in two parts, in 1605 and 1615, featuring the character of the same name: Don Quixote (character).

Don Quixote or Quixote (with variations in spelling) may also refer to:

== Arts, entertainment and media ==
=== Film ===
- Don Quixote (1903 film), a French silent film directed by Ferdinand Zecca and Lucien Nonguet
- Don Quixote (1923 film), a British silent film directed by Maurice Elvey
- Don Quixote (1926 film), a Danish silent film directed by Lau Lauritzen Sr.
- Don Quixote (1933 film), a French–British film by G. W. Pabst
- Don Quixote (1947 film), a Spanish film directed by Rafael Gil
- Don Quixote (1957 film), a Soviet film directed by Grigori Kozintsev
- I, Don Quixote, a 1959 CBS DuPont Show of the Month television play
- Don Quixote (unfinished film), directed by Orson Welles and filmed between 1955 and 1969
- Don Kihot (film), a 1961 animated short film
- Don Quixote (1973 film), a 1973 Australian ballet film
- The Adventures of Don Quixote, a 1973 BBC Play of the Month
- Don Quixote of La Mancha (1987 film), a 1987 animated film produced by Burbank Films Australia
- Don Quixote (2000 film), an American TV film directed by Peter Yates and starring John Lithgow
- Don Quixote, Knight Errant, a 2002 Spanish film directed by Manuel Gutiérrez Aragón
- Don Quixote (2010 film), a Chinese film directed by Ah Gan
- Don Quixote (2015 film), an American film featuring James Franco

=== Music ===
- Burlesque de Quixotte (TWV 55:G10), an orchestral suite by Georg Philipp Telemann, composed c. 1761
- Don Quichotte à Dulcinée (composed between 1932 and 1933), a three-song cycle by Maurice Ravel
- Don Quixote (Strauss), a tone poem by Richard Strauss that premiered in 1898
- Don Quixote, A Musical Picture after Cervantes, Op. 87 (1869) by Anton Rubinstein

==== Ballet ====
- Don Quixote (ballet) (1869), choreographed by Marius Petipa to the music of Ludwig Minkus
- Don Quixote (1965), choreographed by George Balanchine to the music of Nicolas Nabokov
- Don Quixote, or Fantasies of a Madman, choreographed by Boris Eifman

==== Opera ====
- Don Quixote (opera) (1898), by Wilhelm Kienzl
- Don Chisciotte in Sierra Morena (1719), by Francesco Bartolomeo Conti
- Don Quichotte (1864), rearranged by Victorien Sardou and Charles-Louis-Etienne Nuitter and music by Maurice Renaud
- Don Quichotte (1910), by Jules Massenet
- Don Quijote (2000), by Cristóbal Halffter

==== Albums and songs ====
- Don Quixote (album), a 1972 album by Gordon Lightfoot which also featured a song titled "Don Quixote"
- "Don Quichotte (No Están Aquí)" (1984), a song by Magazine 60
  - "Don Quixote Marijuana", a 1999 parody of the Magazine 60 song by Brujeria
- "Don Quijote" (1981), a song by Neoton Família
- Quijote, a 1982 song by Julio Iglesias.
- "Don Quixote" (Nik Kershaw song), a 1984 song by Nik Kershaw
- "Don Quixote", a 1996 song by Cherry Poppin' Daddies, from the album Kids on the Street
- "Don Quixote", a 2001 song by Pencey Prep
- "Don Quixote", a 2016 song by Drapht featuring Hilltop Hoods
- "Don Quixote", a 2010 song by Coldplay performed during the Viva la Vida Tour
- "Don Quixote", a 2022 song by Seventeen from Face the Sun

=== Television ===
==== Episodes ====
- "Don Quixote", Ark II episode 14 (1976)
- "Don Quixote", CBS Television Workshop (1952) episode 1 (1952)
- "Don Quixote", Great Books season 4, episode 1 (1997)

==== Shows ====
- El Quijote de Miguel de Cervantes, a 1992 Spanish television series directed by Manuel Gutiérrez Aragón
- Don Quixote (TV series), a 2011 Japanese television series
- Don Quijote de la Mancha, an animated series from Spain produced in 1979-1980

=== Theatre ===
- The Comical History of Don Quixote, a 1694 three-part play by Thomas d'Urfey
- Don Quixote, a 2010 play written by Peter Anderson and Colin Heath

=== Visual arts ===
- Don Quixote (Picasso), a 1955 sketch by Pablo Picasso
- Don Quixote (Kennedy Center sculpture), a 1976 sculpture by Aurelio Teno

=== Other arts, entertainment and media ===
- Quixote (1954–1960), a literary magazine edited by Jean Rikhoff
- Don Quixote, U.S.A., a 1966 novel by Richard P. Powell
- Don Quixote, a character from the video game Limbus Company
- Don Quixote: A Graphic Novel Adaptation, a 2023 comic book by Paul and Gaëtan Brizzi
- Donquixote Doflamingo, a character in the anime and manga, One Piece

== Science and technology ==
=== Astronomy ===
- 3552 Don Quixote, an asteroid
- Don Quijote (spacecraft), an uncrewed space mission concept by the European Space Agency
- Don Quijote, a CubeSat spacecraft developed by the European Space Agency
- Mu Arae b, an exoplanet named Quijote

== Other uses ==
- Don Quichotte (magazine), a defunct French language weekly in Egypt
- Don Quijote (store), a discount store with locations in Japan, Hawaii and Singapore
- Don Quijote Airport, an airport south of Ciudad Real, Spain
- Don Quixote Pond, a pond in Antarctica

== See also ==
- DonkeyHotey, an American political cartoonist
- Donkey Xote, a 2007 Spanish-Italian animated film directed by Jose Pozo
- Don Q (disambiguation)
- Man of La Mancha, a play based on I, Don Quixote
- Man of La Mancha (film), based on I, Don Quixote
- The Return of Don Quixote, a 1927 novel by G. K. Chesterton
- The Man Who Killed Don Quixote, a 2018 adventure-comedy film directed by Terry Gilliam
