= Quichotte =

Quichotte can refer to:

- Don Quixote, novel written by 17th Century Spanish writer Miguel de Cervantes.
- Don Quichotte chez la Duchesse, comic ballet composed by Joseph Bodin de Boismortier, based on the novel by Cervantes.
- Quichotte (album), 1980 album by Tangerine Dream, later released as "Pergamon".
- Quichotte (novel), 2019 novel by author Salman Rushdie

== See also ==
- Don Quixote (disambiguation)
