= The Ebony Horse =

Folk tale of the Arabian Nights

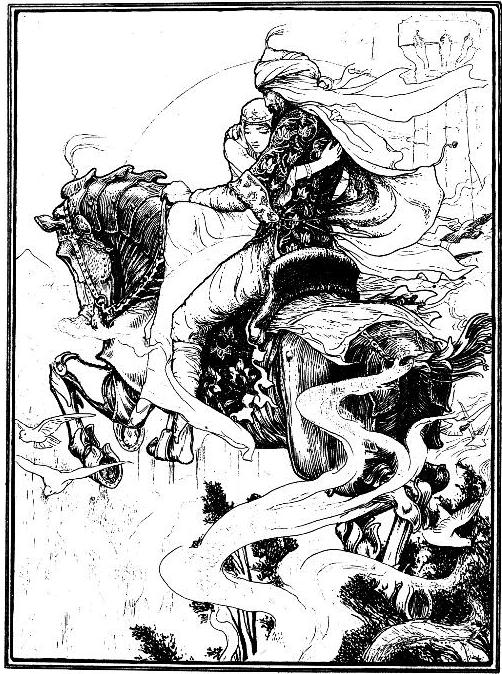
- The Prince flies with the princess on the mechanical horse. Illustration by John D. Batten.

Folk tale
- Name: The Ebony Horse
- Also known as: The Enchanted Horse
- Aarne–Thompson grouping: ATU 575 (The Prince's Wings)
- Published in: One Thousand and One Nights
- Related: The Wooden Eagle (ru)

The Ebony Horse, The Enchanted Horse or The Magic Horse is a folk tale featured in the Arabian Nights. It features a flying mechanical horse, controlled using keys, that could fly into outer space and towards the Sun. The ebony horse can fly the distance of one year in a single day, and is used as a vehicle by the Prince of Persia, Qamar al-Aqmar, in his adventures across Persia, Arabia and Byzantium.

According to scholarship, the tale inspired literary stories about a flying mechanical horse in Europe. Variants from oral tradition have been collected mostly from Europe and Asia, but are also attested in Africa. Although the tale appears in the work One Thousand and One Nights, a similar story is attested earlier in the Indian Panchatantra, albeit with a flying bird-like mechanism in the shape of a Garuda.

== Source ==
According to researcher Ulrich Marzolph, the tale "The Ebony Horse" was part of the story repertoire of Hanna Diyab, a Christian Maronite who provided several tales to French writer Antoine Galland. As per Galland's diary, the tale was told on 13 May 1709.

== Summary ==
An Indian craftsman and inventor of magical devices arrives in the Persian city of Shiraz at the time of the New Year celebration, mounted upon an artificial horse – described as life-like, despite its mechanical nature. The king is so impressed with this automaton that he decides to present his son, the prince, with the steed.

The young prince wastes no time in climbing into the saddle and the horse ascends swiftly into the sky. When prince decides that he has flown high enough he tries to make the horse land, but finds that he cannot. Far from landing, the horse instead flies off with the prince, spiriting him away to unknown lands. Later, he rides the flying mechanical horse to the kingdom of Bengal and meets a beautiful princess, who becomes enamoured of him.

The young prince retells his adventures to the princess, and they exchange first pleasantries and later sweet nothings as they fall ever more deeply in love. Soon, the Persian youth convinces the Bengali princess to ride the mechanical marvel with him to his homeland of Persia.

Meanwhile, the Indian artifex had been unjustly imprisoned due to the disastrous test flight of his creation. In his cell, he sees the prince arriving with his beloved maiden. Reunited with his beloved son, the King of Persia releases the craftsman, who seizes the opportunity for revenge, using the horse to abduct the princess and disappearing swiftly over the horizon with her.

They soon arrive in the kingdom of Cashmere. The king of that country rescues the princess from the Indian and resolves to marry her, without her consent. As soon as the princess recovers from her shock, she pretends to have gone mad in order to forestall her forced marriage.

Determined to recover his beloved, the Persian prince wanders in search of her until he reaches Cashmere, where he learns his maiden is alive. He then hatches a plan to escape with his beloved on the mechanical horse back to Persia. By pretending to be a doctor, he is able to approach the princess and reveal himself to her. By having her pretend to be partially cured, the prince succeeds in persuading the king of Cashmere to openly present the ebony horse to complete the princess' healing. In an unattended moment, he and the princess use the horse to fly back to Persia, where they are happily married.

== Legacy ==
Scholarship points that the tale migrated to Europe and inspired similar medieval stories about a fabulous mechanical horse. These stories include Cleomades, Chaucer's The Squire's Tale, Valentine and Orson and Meliacin ou le Cheval de Fust, by troubador Girart d'Amiens (fr).

The Horse and His Boy by C.S. Lewis carries key elements in both story and specifics like the structure of the Horse, from this story.

== Analysis ==
=== Tale type ===
The tale is classified in Aarne–Thompson–Uther Index as ATU 575, "The Prince's Wings". These tales show two types of narrative:

- The first one: a metalsmith and a tinkerer take part in a contest to build a mechanical marvel to impress the king and his son. A mechanical horse is built and delivered to the king, to the delight of the young prince.
- The second one: the prince himself commissions from a skilled craftsman to fashion a winged apparatus to allow him to fly (eg. a pair of wings or a wooden bird).

=== Motifs ===
==== The flying machine ====
Ethnologist Verrier Elwin commented that some folk tales replace the original flying machine for a trunk or a chair, and that the motif of the equine machine is common in Indian folk-tales. Similarly, according to scholar Karel Horálek, the flying machine, which appears in Indian variants, also appears in "many Asian tales". Hungarian professor Ákos Dömötör, in the notes to tale type ATU 575 in the Hungarian National Catalogue of Folktales (MNK), remarked that the wooden bird is an "Oriental" theme.

=== Origins ===
The tale The Ebony Horse, in particular, was suggested by mythologist Thomas Keightley, in his book Tales and Popular Fictions, to have originated from a genuine Persian source, since it does not contain elements from Islamic religion.

The oldest attestation and possible origin of the tale type is suggested to be an 11th century Jain recension of the Pancatantra, in the story The Weaver as Vishnu. In this tale, a poor weaver fashions an artificial likeness of legendary bird mount Garuda, the ride of god Vishnu. He uses the construct to reach the topmost room of the princess he fell in love with and poses as Lord Vishnu to impress his beloved.

Henry Parker, who collected some Sri Lankan variants of the tale type, identified three different origins for the horse: (1), a wooden flying horse created by a supernatural being; (2), a wooden flying horse made by human hands and "magical art"; and (3) construction of one "by mechanical art". He also suggested that a flying horse, either of wax or wood, appears in ancient Indian literature (e.g., the Rig Veda), and may date from before the time of Christ. He also saw two possible routes of diffusion: either the tale developed in India or in Sri Lanka, and was diffused by Arabs; or the image of a winged quadruped, attested in old Assyria and Mesopotamia, "spread to the early Aryans".

Another line of scholarship sees a possible predecessor of the tale type with Chinese god Lu Ban, patron deity of carpenters and builders.

== Variants ==
=== Distribution ===
Stith Thompson sees a sparsity of the tale in European compilations, although the elements of the prince's journey on the mechanical apparatus appear in Eastern tales. In addition, Jack V. Haney argued that variants appear "in a number of Western European traditions", while German scholar Ulrich Marzolph locates variants in Central and Eastern Europe.

Czech scholar Karel Horálek, in Enzyklopädie des Märchens, considered India the "center of diffusion" of the tale type. Furthermore, Horálek located two major regions of distribution: in the West, in Central Europe, Southeastern Europe and Eastern Europe; in the East, India, Persia and neighbouring countries. He also considered Turkey and Caucasus as a "transitional area" between both regions.

=== Europe ===
==== Romani people ====
Philologist Franz Miklosich collected a variant in Romani language which he titled Der geflügelte Held ("The Flying Hero"), about an artifex that fashions a pair of wings.

In a Romani-Bukovina tale collected by Francis Hindes Groome, The Winged Hero, a skilled but poor craftsman begins to craft a pair of wings, after he saw them in a dream. He then uses the wings to fly to the "Ninth Region", where he sells his work to an emperor's son. The prince uses the wings and flies to another realm, where he learns from an old woman that a princess is locked away in a tower by her own father.

Transylvanian linguist Heinrich von Wlislocki collected and published a "Zigeunermärchen" titled O mánusch kástuni ciriklehá (Der Mann mit der hölzernen Vogel or The Wooden Bird).

==== Germany ====
The Brothers Grimm also collected and published a German variant titled Vom Schreiner und Drechsler ("Of The Carpenter and The Turner"; or "The Maker and the Turner"). This story was published in the first edition of their collection, in 1812, with numbering KHM 77, but omitted from the definitive edition.

A variant exists in the newly discovered collection of Bavarian folk and fairy tales of Franz Xaver von Schönwerth, titled The Flying Trunk (German: Das fliegende Kästchen).

In a variant collected from Oldenburg by jurist Ludwig Strackerjan (de), Vom Königssohn, der fliegen gelernt hatte ("About a King's Son who learned to fly"), each of the king's sons learn a trade: one becomes a metalsmith and the other a carpenter. The first one builds a fish of silver and the second fashions a pair of wooden wings. He later uses the wings to fly to another realm, where he convinces a sheltered princess he is the Archangel Gabriel.

==== Italy ====
Ignaz and Joseph Zingerle collected a variant from Merano, titled Die zwei Künstler ("The Two Craftsmen"), wherein a goldsmith and a fortune-teller compete to see who can craft a fine work: the goldsmith some gold fishes and the fortuneteller a pair of wooden wings.

==== Hungary ====
According to the Hungarian Folktale Catalogue (MNK), tale type 575, A repülő királyfi ("The Flying Prince"), registers few variants in Hungary.

Journalist Elek Benedek collected a Hungarian tale titled A Szárnyas Királyfi ("The Winged Prince"). In this story, the king traps his daughter in the tower, but a prince visits her every night with a pair of wings.

==== Greece ====
Johann Georg von Hahn collected a variant from Zagori, Greece, titled Der Mann mit der Reisekiste ("The Man with the Flying Trunk"): a rich man with an intense wanderlust commissions a flying trunk form his carpenter friend. The carpenter fills the box with "magic vapours" and the device takes flight. The rich man arrives at the tower of a princess from another realm and pretends to be the Son of God.

==== Bulgaria ====
The type is also attested in the Bulgarian Folktale Catalogue with the title "Летящият дървен кон" or Das fliegende Holzpferd ("The Flying Wooden Horse"): a goldsmith and a carpenter vie for the same woman, and arrange a mediator for their dispute (e.g., a king); in order to settle their dispute, they each fashion an apparatus (the carpenter a wooden horse, and the goldsmith a metal object); the carpenter wins, and the prince rides on the flying horse to another kingdom, where he secretly visits a princess in her tower; they escape their execution, but the wooden horse burns down, and they are separated.

==== Russia ====
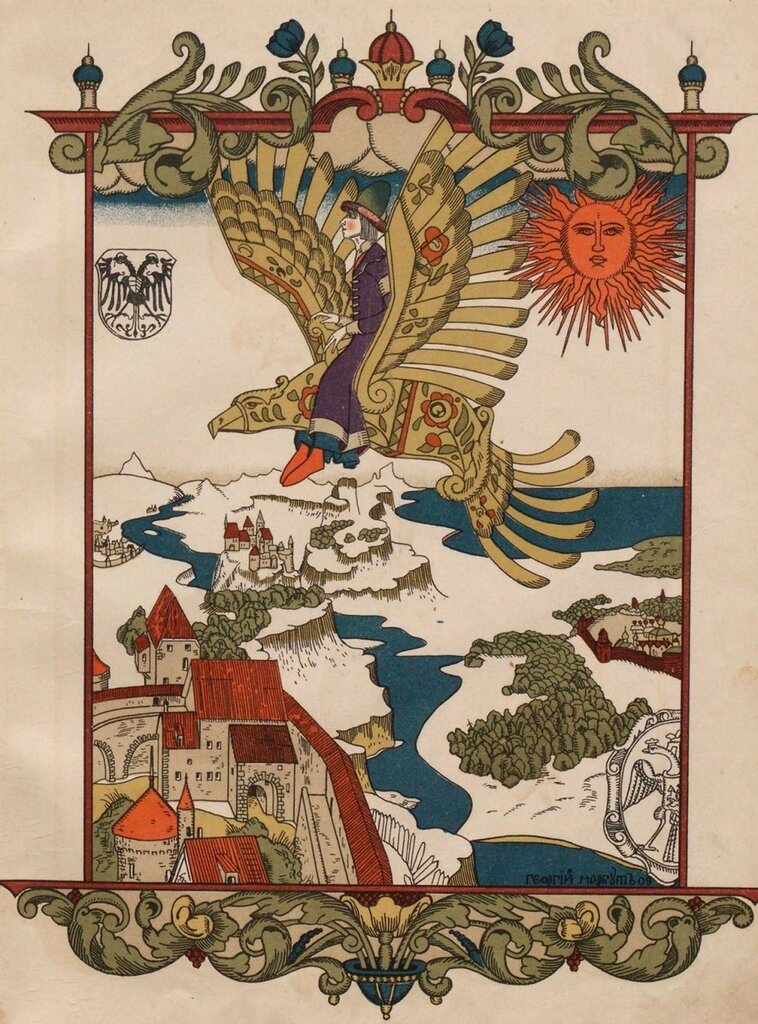
The Prince flies on the wings of the fabulous wooden eagle over the wintry kingdoms. Illustration by Heorhiy Narbut (1909).

The tale type is known in Russia and Slavic-speaking regions as "Деревянный орёл (голубь)" (The Wooden Eagle (Dove)), after the creation that appears in the story: a wooden eagle. Professor Jack Haney stated that the tale type was "widely collected" in Russia.

Another Russian variant of the tale type is Märchen von dem berühmten und ausgezeichneten Prinzen Malandrach Ibrahimowitsch und der schönen Prinzeß Salikalla or Prince Malandrach and the Princess Salikalla, a tale that first appeared in a German language compilation of fairy tales, published by Anton Dietrich in 1831, in Leipzig. The titular prince becomes fascinated with the idea of flying after reading about it in a book of fairy tales. He wants to commission a pair of wooden wings from a carpenter.

Professor Jack V. Haney translated a variant from raconteur Matvei M. Korguev (1883–1943), titled The Airplane (How an Airplane in a Room Carried Off the Tsar’s Son) and also classified as ATU 575. In this tale, the plane replaces the wooden eagle.

==== Poland ====
Polish philologist and folklorist Julian Krzyżanowski, establisher of the Polish Folktale Catalogue according to the international index, classified a similar story in Poland as type 575, Skrzydlaty królewicz ("Winged Prince"): the hero either commissions a pair of wings from an artisan or steals the wings from his father, and flies away to a kingdom where a princess is locked in the tower.

In a Polish tale, "Об одном королевиче, который на крыльях летал" ("About a prince who flew on wings"), a king commissions a pair of wings from a master craftsman. The prince finds the wings, puts them on and flies to another kingdom where he visits the princess—locked in a tower—by pretending to be an angel.

==== Estonia ====
The tale type is registered in Estonia with the title Kuningapoja imetiivad ("The Magic Wings of the King’s Son"). In Estonian variants, the prince may gain either an iron hawk from the blacksmith, or wooden wings from the carpenter. He uses the contraption to fly to another kingdom.

==== Lithuania ====
The tale type also exists in Lithuania with the name Karalaičio sparnai ("The Wings of the King"). Twelve variants were registered until 1936, when folklorist Jonas Balys (lt) published his analysis of Lithuanian folktales.

==== Latvia ====
The tale type also exists in Latvia, with the title Brīnuma spārni ("Wonderful Wings"): an artisan fashions the artificial bird for the prince, who travels to another kingdom, falls in love with a princess and escapes with her on the flying device.

In a Latvian variant, "Волшебный конь" ("The Magic Horse"), a blacksmith's apprentice constructs a mechanical horse. The prince convinces the king to give it to him as a gift. He flies on the artificial horse to another kingdom by a manipulating a panel of screws, where a princess is being held at a tower. At the end of the tale, before the princess's father has a chance to execute her and the prince, they escape on the mechanical horse.

==== Armenia ====
In Armenian variants of the tale type, the prince departs either on a wooden horse or on a big wheel to the princess's kingdom. After the prince loses the flying machine, his family is separated, but reunites at the end of the story, as the princess averts a possible incestual marriage with her own son by the prince.

==== Azerbaijan ====
Azerbaijani scholarship registers a similar tale in the Azerbaijani Tale Corpus, indexed as 575, Taxta at ("Wooden Horse"): a jeweller and a carpenter bet against each other whose skills are better (or for the love of a woman); the prince is called to arbiter the dispute; the jeweller fashions a golden rooster and the carpenter a wooden horse, which the prince rides on to another kingdom; in this second kingdom, the prince absconds with the local king's daughter and both flee on the horse, but are separated when the horse burns down; the princess reaches another city and places an image to find her lover; the prince and the princess reunite.

==== Georgia ====
Georgian scholarship registers 3 variants of type 575, "Wooden Horse", in Georgia: the vehicle is a wooden horse the prince flies on to meet a princess, and sometimes the tale shows a long period of separation for the couple.

In a Georgian tale titled "Царевич и деревянный конь" ("The Tsar's Son and the Wooden Horse"), a childless royal couple has a son at last, and invites the entire kingdom. A carpenter and a metalsmith decide to create presents for the newborn prince, each in their own craft. The carpenter delivers a wooden horse that can fly. The prince delights at the present. The metalsmith, however, warns his colleague that if the prince mounts the horse, he will not know how to control it. So the carpenter returns to the palace and teaches the prince, who ends up flying on the horse to regions unknown. He reaches the roof of an old woman, in another kingdom, and she invites him in. He learns of the princess locked in the tower and flies towards her on the horse. After escaping an attempted execution, the prince and the princess flee the kingdom and separate; the horse is destroyed in a fire. The princess goes to another kingdom and becomes its sovereign when a bird lands on her head three times. Using her royal powers, she orders a bridge to be made and a picture of her husband to be affixed on it.

==== Ossetia ====
In an Ossetian tale titled "Деревянный голубь" ("The Wooden Dove"), a metalsmith and carpenter argue whose is the more necessary skill: metalworking or woodworking. They bring their dispute to the king to judge. The metalsmith produces a golden purse and the carpenter a wooden dove. The king awards the carpenter. The king's son overhears the decision and decides to play with the wooden dove and flies to another kingdom. He meets the son of the local aldar (ruler) and learns his sister, the aldar's daughter, lives a sad life in a high tower. The prince decides to fly to her room on the wooden dove and meets her. They fall in love and she becomes pregnant. Her servants notice something amiss with the princess, and fear the aldar may execute them. The princess and the prince escape on the wooden dove and marry. The tale continues with the adventures of the three sons of the couple, who also travel on their father's wooden dove.

=== Asia ===
==== Middle East ====
A similar story, also named The Tale of the Ebony Horse, can also be found in One Hundred and One Nights, another book of Arab literature and whose original manuscripts were recently discovered.

According to professor Ruth B. Bottigheimer, an Arabic-language manuscript mentions a tale titled Fars al-abnus ('Horse of Ebony'), predating Hanna Diyab's story by two centuries. The tale was apparently part of the second volume of Tales of the Marvellous and News of the Strange, now lost.

Andrew Lang published the story with the name The Enchanted Horse, in his translation of The Arabian Nights, and renamed the prince Firouz Schah.

Folklorist William Forsell Kirby published a tale from "The Arabian Nights" titled Story of the Labourer and the Flying Chair: a poor labourer spends his earnings on an old chair. He returns to the seller wanting to know the instructions on how to use the chair. The labourer manages to control the chair, which takes him to a distant terrace. He walks from the terrace into a room where a princess was sleeping. The maiden awakes with a startle with the strange person in the room, and he presents himself as Azrael, the Angel of Death.

French orientalist François Pétit de La Croix published in the 18th century a compilation of Middle Eastern tales, titled Les Mille et un jours ("The Thousand and One Days"). This compilation also contains a variant of the tale type, named Story of Malek and the Princess Schirine: the hero Malek receives a bird-shaped box from an artisan. He enters the box and flies away to a distant kingdom. In this realm, he learns of King Bahaman, who imprisoned his daughter, the Princess Schirine, in a tower.

==== Turkey ====
German scholar Ulrich Marzolph located another narrative from the Ottoman Turkish Ferec baʿd eş-şidde ('Relief After Hardship'), an anonymous book dated to the 15th century. In tale nr. 13 of the compilation, titled the Weaver and the trick He played on the Carpenter, a weaver and a carpenter compete over the love of a woman, and each creates an project: the weaver a seamless shirt and the carpenter a large chest, which he tricks the weaver to go inside. The weaver flies off on the chest and reaches the kingdom of Oman, where he introduces himself as the Angel Gabriel to a princess locked in a tower. Marzolph noted that the tale was the source for Malek and Schirin, a tale contained in the work A Thousand and One Days.

==== China ====
Chinese folklorist and scholar Ting Nai-tung (zh) established a second typological classification of Chinese folktales (the first was by Wolfram Eberhard in the 1930s). According to this new system, in tale type 575, "The Prince's Wings", the main character is not a prince, and the means of transportation is either a horse or an eagle.

==== Iran ====
A Persian variant is reported to have been analysed by folklorist William Alexander Clouston's Magic Elements in the Squire's Tale. In this tale, a weaver and a carpenter in Nishapur compete to impress a local woman. The weaver sews a seamless shirt and the carpenter a magic coffer. The weaver tests the coffer and flies away to another realm. He uses the coffer to reach the castle where the daughter of the king of Oman is being held and introduces himself as the Angel Gabriel. As the story continues, he defeats an army for the King of Oman, but loses the flying coffer. At the end of the story, the king discovers the ruse, but decides to keep it a secret after the angel "Gabriel" achieved wins for him.

==== Central Asia ====
A similar tale is attested in a manuscript archived in the Institute of Oriental Studies of the Academy of Sciences of the then Soviet Union. The manuscript, indexed as A 103, is dated to the 18th century, and tentatively sourced from Central Asia. In a summary of the tale, titled "Рассказ о столяре, ткаче, дочери оманского падишаха и о чудесах, которые они пережили" ("The Story of a Carpenter, a Weaver, the Daughter of the Omani Padishah and the Wonders they Experienced"), a carpenter and a weaver compete for the hand of a woman: the weaver sews a cloth without needle nor thread, and the carpenter, in retaliation, fashions a flying box he tricks his rival to enter. The weaver travels on the flying box to Oman and falls in love with the Omani princess, to whom he introduces himself as an "arkhan". The weaver manages to trick the padishah of Oman, and actually has success in battle with the flying box, until the day the box is burnt down. The padishah discovers the weaver's secret, but promises to keep it to himself, since the princess is expecting a child.

==== Uzbekistan ====
In an Uzbek variant, titled "Столяр и портной" ("The Carpenter and The Weaver"), a carpenter and a weaver are good friends. One day, they compete against each other to test their abilities to impress a girl: the weaver creates a seamless shirt. Jealous, the carpenter builds a chest and invites the weaver for a test drive. He locks his friend inside the chest, turns a screw and the chest soars to another kingdom. The weaver reaches gets off the chest, hides it and learns the local padishah has a daughter that he locks up in a tower. The weaver uses the chest to fly up to her room, while the padishah is away on a hunt, and presents himself as Azrael.

In another Uzbek tale, "Умелые руки" ("Skillful Hands"), a boy named Rafik is taken to be apprenticed by a carpenter. One night, he has a dream about beautiful maidens. Entranced by such vision, he slowly wither, until his father and the carpenter fashion a flying wooden horse that the boy can use to look for her. He flies on the machine and lands in another place. He learns the maidens come in the shape of doves to bathe in a nearby lake and he must hide the garments of his beloved one. He does, but she escapes with the other doves. He follows her on the wooden horse until a meadow where they rest up. Rafik wakes her up and convinces her to go with him. They return to a village and marry. She gives birth to a son. Rafik flies on the horse to another kingdom, but a fire destroys the apparatus and he is stranded there. Unaware of her husband's fate, she takes their son and goes to a caravan to another city, where they set up shop in hopes of finding Rafik. Years pass, and the family is finally reunited.

==== South Asia ====
Stith Thompson and Warren Roberts's Types of Indic Oral Tales registers the existence of tale type 575, "The Prince's Wings", in modern Indian and South Asian sources. In the Indic type, the hero finds the flying horse (or other wooden mechanism), flies away to another kingdom and courts the local princess; they later escape on the mechanism, but are separated when it burns down; after their separation, they reunite.

Charles Swynnerton published an Upper Indus tale from Punjab with the title Prince Ahmed and the Flying Horse: Prince Ahmed likes to play with the sons of a goldsmith, an ironsmith, an oilman, and a carpenter, much to his father's disgust. The king decided to imprison the four youths, but the prince, their friends, intercedes in their favour: all four should prove their skills. The four fashion, respectively, six brazen fishes, two large iron fishes, two artificial giants and at last a wooden horse. Prince Ahmed climbs the horse and flies to regions unknown, where he romances a princess and brings her back to his homeland.

===== India =====
Author Mark Thornhill published an Indian tale with the title The Magic Horse. In this tale, a carpenter and a goldsmith compete over who is the most skilled craftsman. The king announces he will be the judge of the dispute and orders them to bring him their finest works. The goldsmith brings a metal fish that can swim and the carpenter a wooden horse that can move about. The king's son mounts the horse and flies away to another kingdom. In this kingdom, he learns about the princess, secluded in a tower, and who is weighed very morning against a garland of flowers so that it can be assured no man has touched her.

Anthropologist Stephen Fuchs collected a tale titled Uṛhan Ghōṛā ("The Flying Horse"), from a Baiga source named Musra, from the Bijora village near Dindori in eastern Mandla. In this tale, the raja sets up a contest between a smith and a carpenter to settle their dispute. The carpenter fashions a winged horse with an internal engine. The raja's young son rides on the horse and is carried over to another kingdom, where he sleeps with the princess. The princess's belly begins to grow and her father discovers the culprit: the foreign prince. On the day of the execution, he escapes with the princess on the winged horse, but the couple must make a hasty descent on a small island for her to give birth. Once their son is born, the family is separated: the young boy is adopted by a royal couple; the princess loss her memory and is adopted as the niece of a lower cast woman, and the prince marries another rani. Their fates converge as the prince stops an incestual marriage between son and the mother.

In another Indian variant, The Flying Horse, a carpenter creates an "airplane with an engine" for his friend, the prince. The prince rides the airplane to a marble palace in a distant kingdom across the ocean, where he meets a princess. They fall in love and she becomes pregnant. After an unfortunate accident, the prince separates from the pregnant princess, who gives birth to a boy. The two are also separated: the boy is found by a couple and his mother is rescued by prostitutes. Years later, the boy becomes a youth, buys his mother from the brothel and meets his father, who has become an old man.

In an Magahi tale translated to English as A Carpenter and a Goldsmith, a carpenter and a goldsmith are good friends and travel around to earn money. However, when it is moment to share the money, they argue over it, and seek the king to arbiter their dispute. The king decides to settle their dispute by having them show their skills: the goldsmith fashions a gold fish and the carpenter creates a horse out of wood, but no one wants to ride it. The king offers money for anyone to ride the wooden horse, and still nothing. The king's son, the prince, mounts the horse and the carpenter presses a button, causing the horse to fly away. The prince flies to another kingdom and falls in love the local princess, who marries him. The princess becomes pregnant and joins the prince in his flight back to his land, but feels unwell during the journey and asks to descend. The princess gives birth to a boy and the prince flies on a horse to fetch a midwife, leaving his wife and son there. However, the prince loses sight of the horse, which was pulled apart by a shepherd, and has to live as a householder. Back to the princess, a merchant finds mother and son and takes them in, then the princess leaves on a pilgrimage, and reaches the place where the wooden horse broke down. She announces she will marry the one who can relate the tale of the wooden horse, but no one can. Her husband, the prince, hears news of this, and goes there. He tells the whole story and reunites with his wife. Both return to the merchant and fetch their son, then the family returns to the princess's kingdom. The couple's parents are relieved to see them alive and well, and the prince's father rewards the carpenter and the goldsmith for their skills.

===== Sri Lanka =====
Author Henry Parker published a Sri Lankan tale titled The Wax Horse: a king hides his son from the outside world due to a prophecy that the son would go away from his kingdom. One day, the young prince sees a wax horse with wings in the market and the king buys it for him. The prince climbs on the horse and flies to another kingdom, eventually meeting a princess.

In another Sri Lankan tale collected by Henry Parker, Concerning a Royal Prince and a Princess, a carpenter's son fashions a Wooden Peacock, which the Prince test drives and arrives in another kingdom. He hides the Wooden Peacock in the foliages and sees a princess bathing. Later, the prince flies to her window. The princess, then, decides to hide her lover inside her room by commissioning a man-sized lamp with a secret compartment. The princess becomes pregnant and escapes with the prince to the jungle. Her royal lover gets stranded in the sea, due to the machinations of fate, and the princess is forced to raise the child on her own. She, however, gets help from an ascetic, who, by performing "an Act of Truth", creates two other children out of flowers for the maiden to rear.

==== Uyghur people ====
In a Uyghur tale, The Wooden Horse, a carpenter and a metalsmith quarrel about who is the most skilled. The king decides to set a contest to settle their dispute: the metalsmith creates an iron fish and the carpenter a wooden horse that can fly. The king's son, the prince, is delighted at the wooden horse and asks his father to try it. The prince controls the device and begins to ascend to the skies, disappearing in the distance. He arrives at another kingdom whose king has built a "palace in the sky" to hide his daughter in. The prince visits the princess with the horse for three times, which infuriates the king. The king orders a nationwide search for the boy. The princess escapes with the prince on the flying wooden horse, but as soon as they land, the princess wants to go back to get a treasure from her mother. She leaves the prince there and flies back to her kingdom, being captured by her own father, who arranged her marriage to another man. The prince begins to notice her absence and wander about in search of food. He finds an orchard with fruits and eats them, and horns and a white beard appear on his face. He eats other fruits and reverses the transformation. He decides to collect some of them and goes back on the road. He finds a prince's retinue and gives some of the fruits to the prince—who is to marry the princess of the sky palace—to cause a physical transformation. Despairing at the situation, the retinue concoct a plan to replace the prince for the fruit seller (which was the youth's plan all along). The youth-as-the-foreign-prince meets the princess again and, after the wedding celebrations, they escape on the wooden horse.

=== Africa ===
==== Morocco ====
René Basset collected a variant in the Berber language.

=== Literary variants ===
Illustrator Howard Pyle included a tale named The Stool of Fortune in his work Twilight Land, a crossover of famous fairy tale characters (Mother Goose, Cinderella, Fortunatus, Sinbad the Sailor, Aladdin, Boots, the Valiant Little Tailor) that meet in an inn to tell stories. In The Stool of Fortune, a nameless wandering soldier is hired by a magician to shoot some animals. Angry at the unjust payment, the soldier enters the magician hut and sits on a three-legged stool, waiting for his employer. Wishing he was anywhere else, the stool obeys his command and starts to fly away. The soldier then arrives at the tower room of a unsuspecting princess and announces himself as "The King of Winds".

Sufi scholar Idries Shah adapted the tale as the children's book The Magic Horse: a King summons a woodcarver and a metalsmith to create wondrous contraptions. The woodcarver constructs a wooden horse, which draws the attention of the king's youngest son, prince Tambal.

== Adaptations ==
The Russian variant of the tale type ATU 575, "The Wooden Eagle", was adapted into a Soviet animated film in 1953 (ru).

The tale type was also adapted into a Czech fantasy film in 1987, titled O princezně Jasněnce a ševci, který létal (Princess Jasnenka and the Flying Shoemaker). The film was based on a homonymous literary fairy tale by Czech author Jan Drda, first published in 1959, in České pohádky.

== See also ==
- Clavileño – Magical wooden horse in Don Quixote
- The Flying Trunk, literary fairy tale by Hans Christian Andersen
- Flying carpet
- Pegasus, mythological flying horse
- Haizum
- Qianlima
- Hippogriff
- Tulpar
- Tianma
- Le cheval de bronze (opera)

== Bibliography ==
- Chauvin, Victor Charles. Bibliographie des ouvrages arabes ou relatifs aux Arabes, publiés dans l'Europe chrétienne de 1810 à 1885. Volume V. Líege: H. Vaillant-Carmanne. 1901. pp. 221-231.
