= Don Quixote and Sancho Panza (Daumier) =

Painting by Honoré Daumier

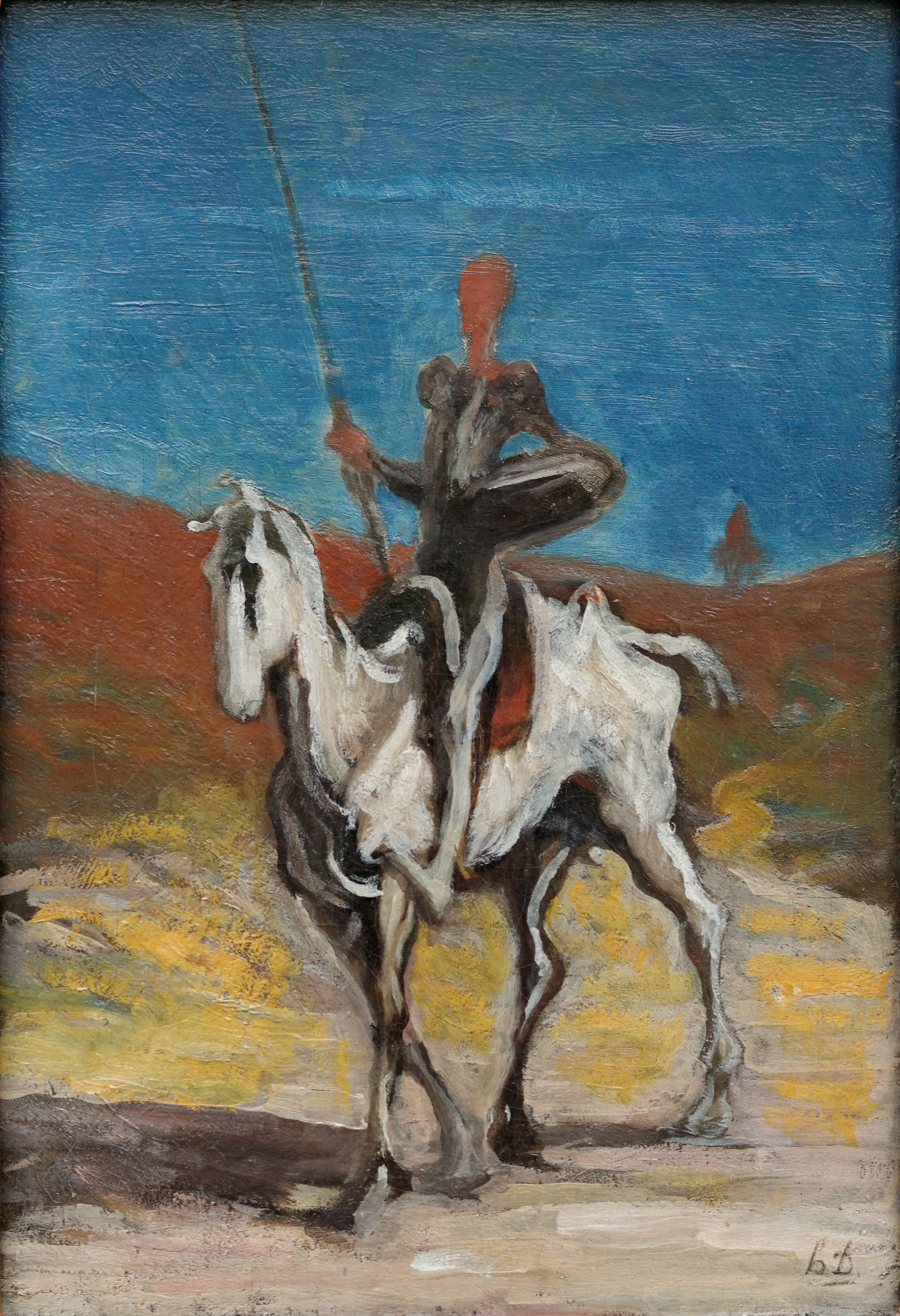
- Artist: Honoré Daumier
- Year: c. 1868
- Medium: oil on canvas
- Dimensions: 52 cm × 32.8 cm (20 in × 12.9 in)
- Location: Neue Pinakothek, Munich

Don Quixote and Sancho Panza is an oil-on-canvas painting by French artist Honoré Daumier, created c. 1868. The work is of small dimensions and has the unfinished appearance of a sketch. It is held in the Neue Pinakothek in Munich.

== Description ==
This is one of the works of literary inspiration created by Daumier during the Second Empire. The artist made many paintings and drawings representing Don Quixote, alone or with Sancho Panza, some twenty-five oils, watercolors and a series of charcoal drawings.

The picture gives the impression of a hastily prepared sketch, because it is painted with wide brush strokes using a meager and basic color palette. In the central part, there is the thin figure of Don Quixote on his grumpy horse, the Rocinante. The rider holds knightly attributes, he is dressed in his armor, wears a shield and a lance, and his chest is proudly protruding. His face is replaced by an ocher-colored stain, leaving his eyes, nose and beard to the viewer's imagination. The figures of the rider and his horse are caricatures whose appearance introduces an atmosphere of strangeness.

The simple background consists of a uniformly blue sky and an earth of ocher and yellow. Part of the landscape was painted with superficial and wide brush strokes, which intensifies the feeling of emptiness and mystery. The artist gave up the use of chiaroscuro, he also rejected the traditional handling of color. He applied paint in large portions creating a flat composition.

The only detail that diversifies the background is the blurry shape visible on the horizon, perhaps it is the outline of a rickety tree or, as some interpreters believe, the figure of his squire, Sancho Panza. He is a shadow that can be seen in the distance, in the horizon, cut out against the sky of intense blue color, as if forming part of the arid landscape.

== Gallery ==
Don Quixote in the Mountains, 1850s, Artizon Museum

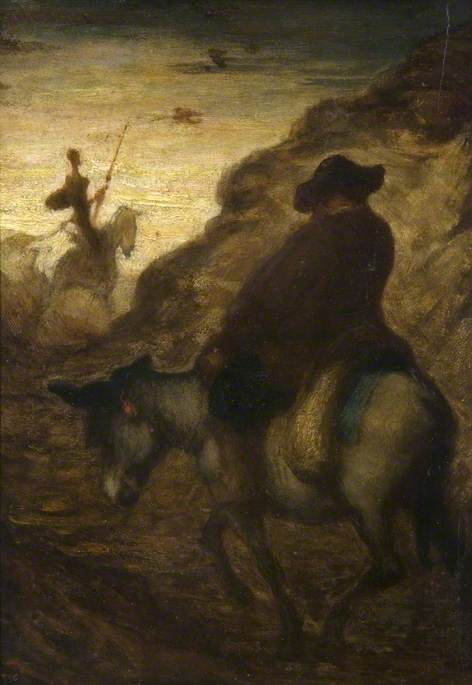
Don Quixote and Sancho Panza, c.1864, Burrell Collection

Don Quixote and Sancho Panza, 1866/68, Alte Nationalgalerie

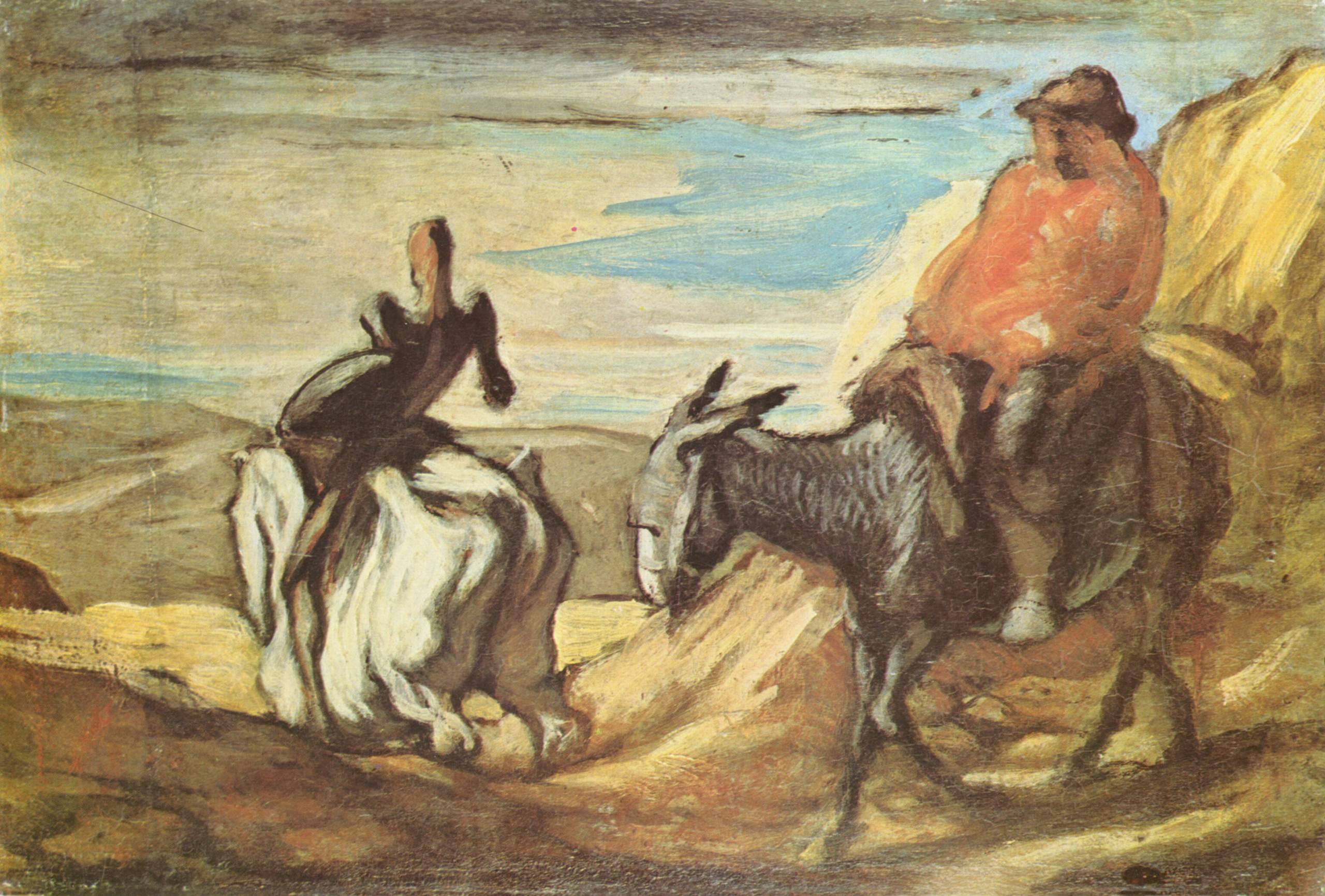
Sancho Panza and Don Quixote in the mountains, 1866/68, Am Römerholz

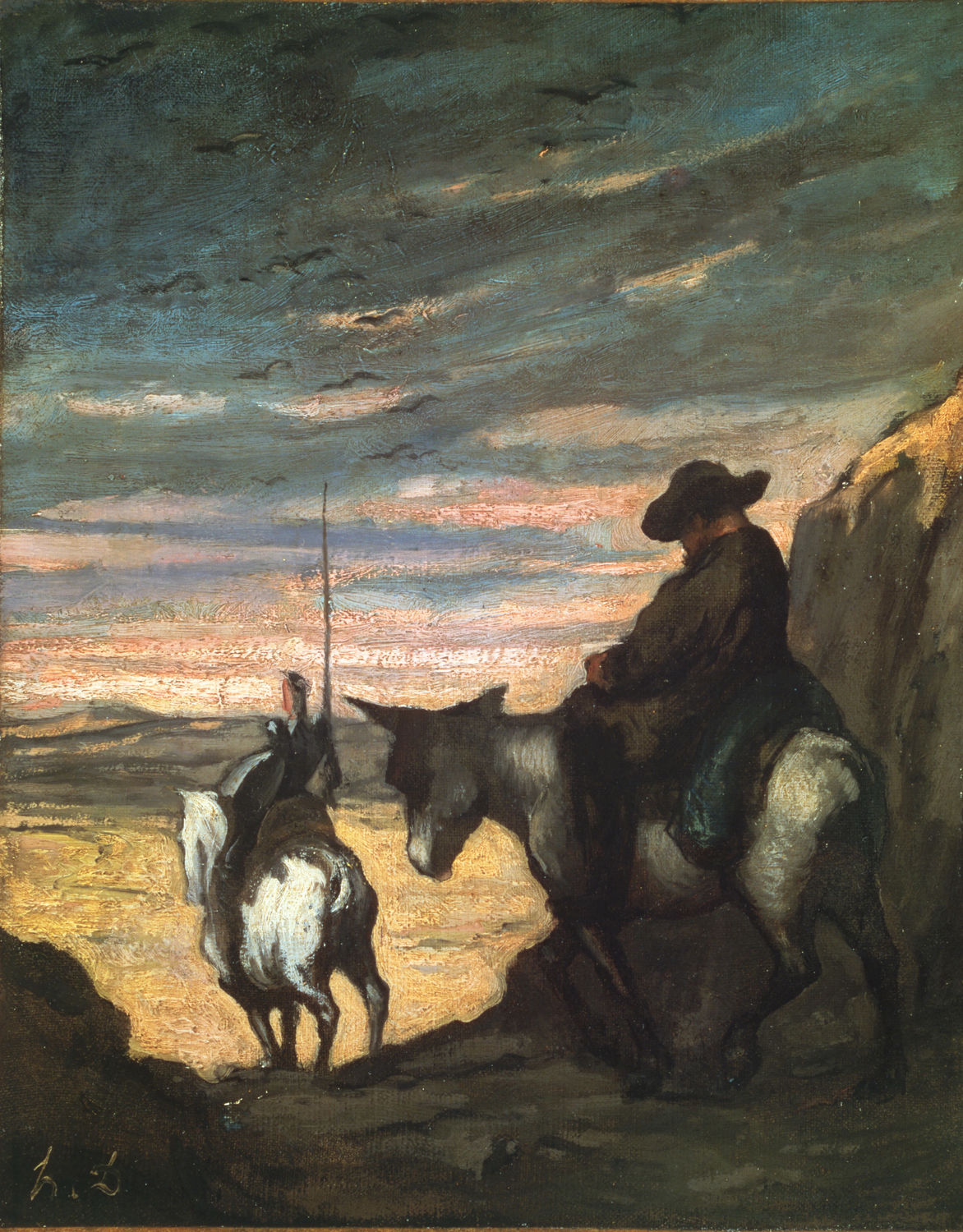
Don Quixote and Sancho Panza, 1866/68, Hammer Museum

Don Quichotte and Sancho Panza, c.1870, Courtauld Institute of Art
