= Clavileño =

Magical wooden horse in Don Quixote

- Don Quixote character
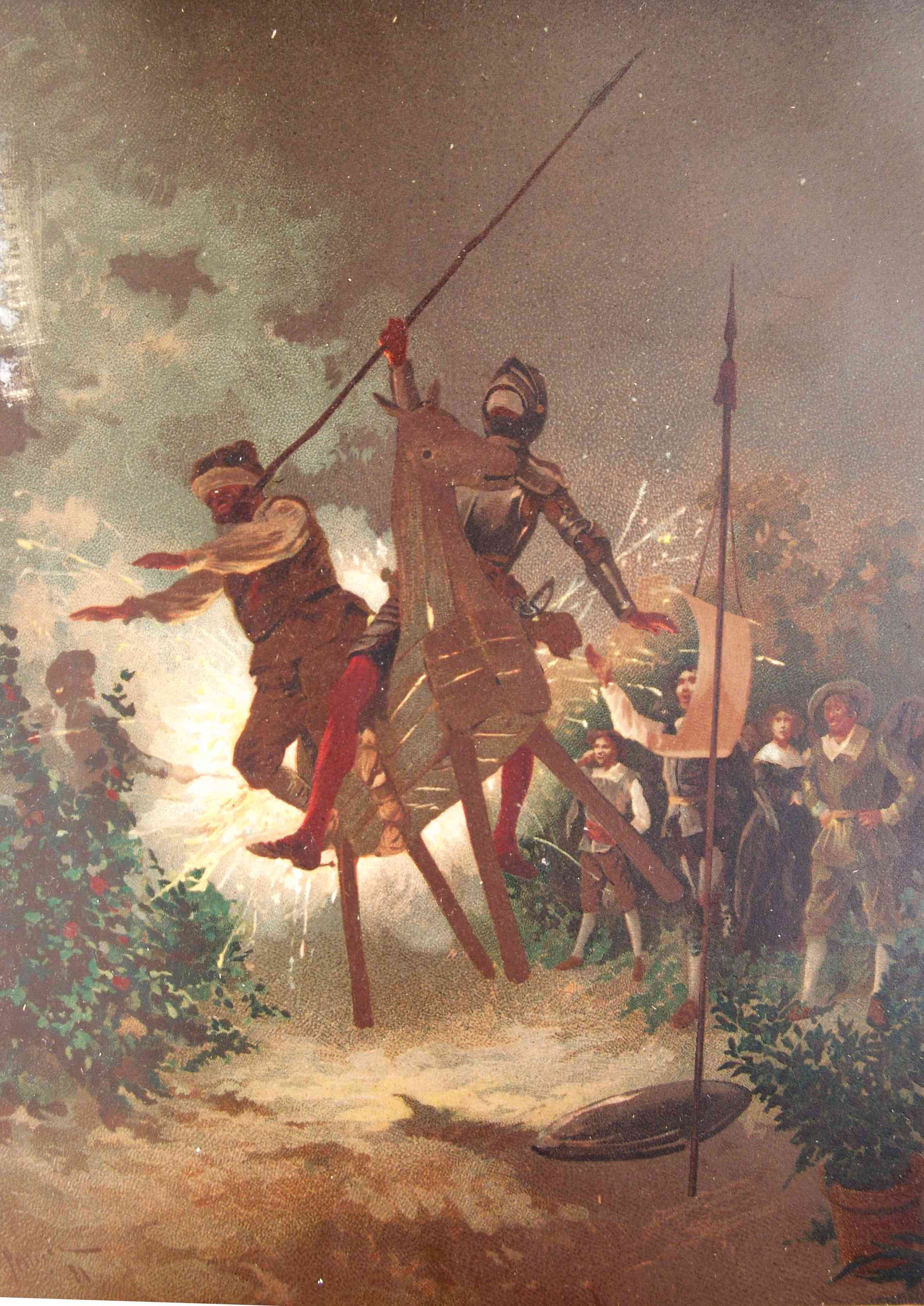
- Don Quixote and Sancho "fly" with the fireworks inside Clavileño (Ricardo Balaca, 1870s).
- Created by: Miguel de Cervantes

In-universe information
- Species: Horse
- Gender: Male

Clavileño the Swift is a fictional wooden horse, notable in both European and Near Eastern folklore, also appearing in chapters 40 and 41 of the second part of the adventures of Don Quixote. It is governed by a pin in its forehead.

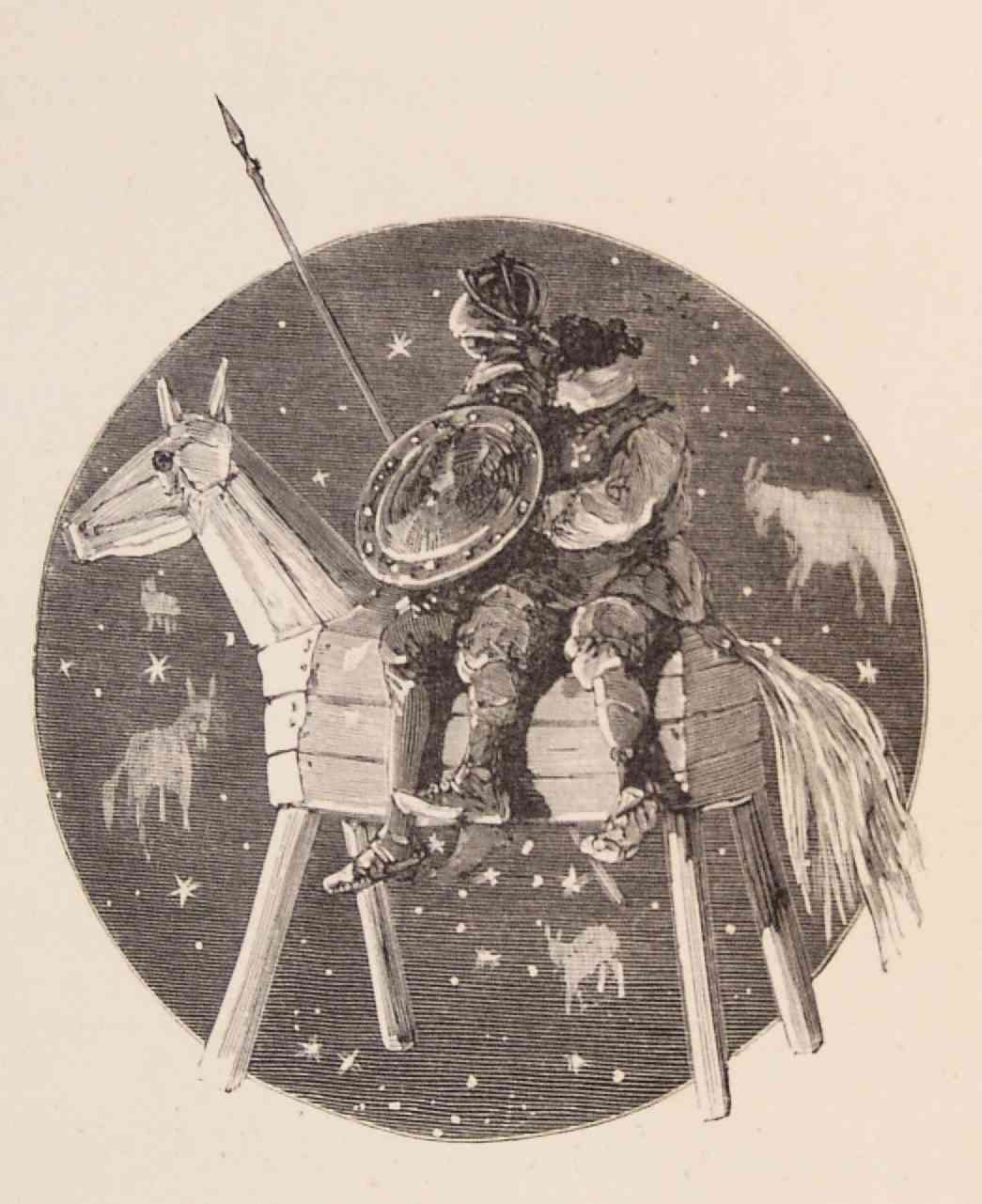
Don Quixote and Sancho imagine they are flying on Clavileño. Ricardo Balaca, 19th century.

Don Quixote and Sancho Panza are tricked into using Clavileño, believing they have flown blindfolded and have controlled the horse with a peg in its head. The Dueña Dolorida (Countess Trifaldi) asserts that she and her ladies will be free of their charmed beards if knight and squire fly on the magical horse, sent by the sorcerer Malambruno. In reality the rocking horse is inanimate and goes nowhere, meanwhile explosives are planted near it to simulate a crash landing. Sancho Panza later goes on to say that he lifted his blindfold while "in flight" and saw the sky.

In Spanish, "peg" is clavija and "wood", leño, hence the name.

Clavileño is shown by some units of the Spanish Air and Space Force in its badges.

== See also ==
- Rocinante, Don Quixote's real ride, made of flesh and blood (or rather bones and blood).
- The Ebony Horse – Folk tale of the Arabian Nights
