= Chapati Movement =

1857 distribution of bread in India

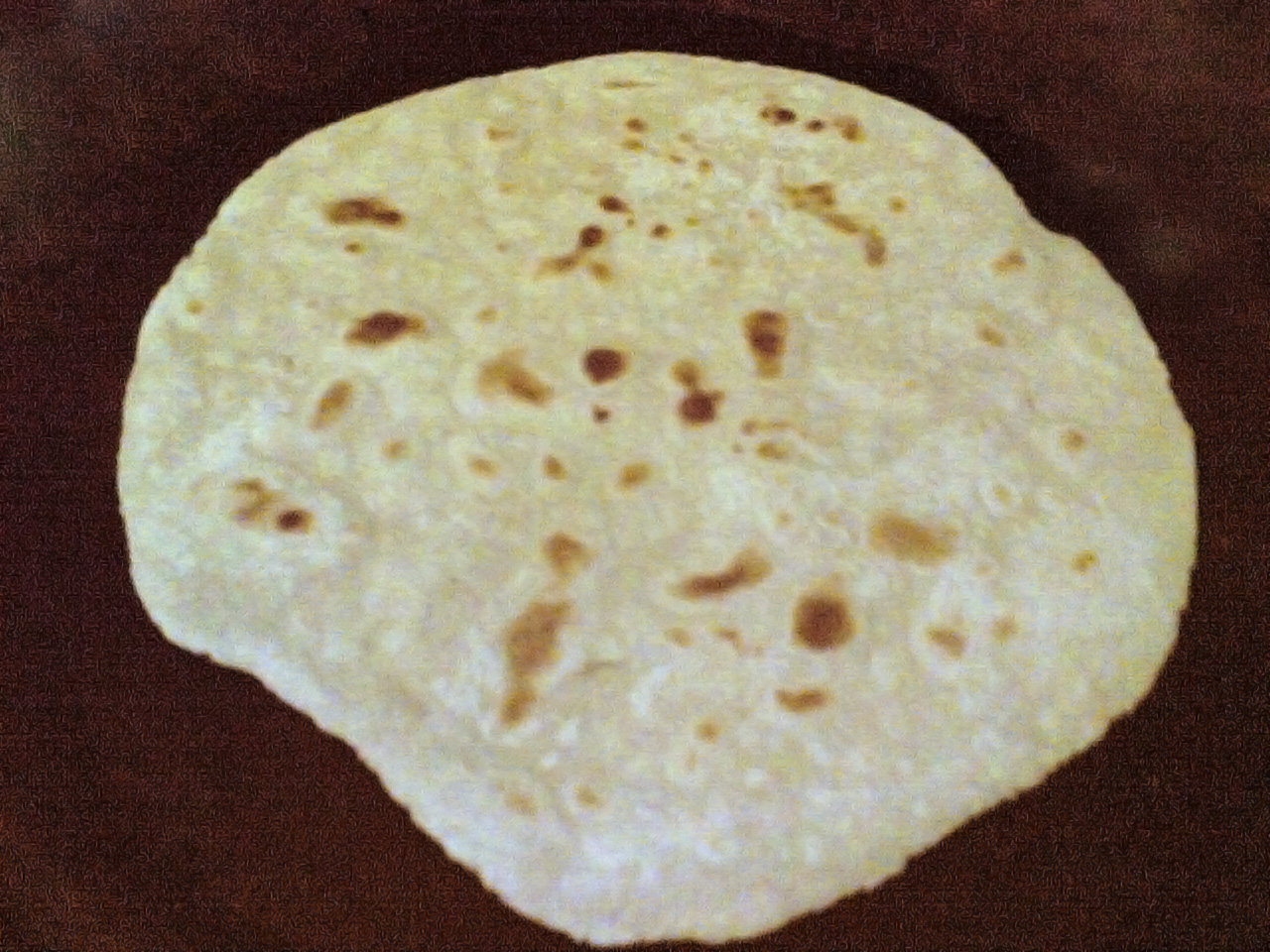
A chapati

The Chapati Movement was a movement in India that involved the mysterious circulation of chapatis, a type of unleavened flatbread, across several North Indian villages in early 1857. The origin of the movement is unknown; though British agents suggested the chapatis may have contained secret notes, but inspections revealed no such messages while Indians believed the movement was a British scheme.

Historian John William Kaye noted that district magistrate and collector of the district of Mathura, Mark Thornhill, had recorded in his memoirs what he thought was an unusual movement of chapatis in early 1857. The movement first came into attention in February 1857. Reports began pouring from villages of North India that thousands of chapatis were passing from one hand to another. The usual distribution procedure involved a person who would come from the jungle, give the village watchman several chapatis and tell him to make more chapatis, and distribute those to watchmen in the nearby villages. The watchman would then travel with chapatis in his turban, often with little to no knowledge of the chapatis' original source.

Indians generally believed this was the work of the British, suspecting that the chapatis were cooked in pork/beef fat or the chapatis were made by the Dalit class in order to subvert Hindu values. The Friend of India, an English newspaper published in Srirampur, reported in its 5 March 1857 edition that British officers were left confused and equally scared when chapatis arrived in every police station in the area. The chapatis had travelled far; from Farrukhabad to Gurgaon, from Avadh via Rohilkhand to Delhi. The speed of distribution was particularly disconcerting to the British because it was much swifter than British mail, and several inquiries were made as to the source and meaning of the movement. They yielded the information that the breads were being distributed far more widely than anyone in Agra had yet realized, and that the Indians who received them generally took them as some sort of a sign. There were reports that lotus flowers and goat flesh were also occasionally distributed with the chapatis.

== See also ==
- Chain letter
