= Don Q (disambiguation) =

Don Q is a Puerto Rican brand of rum.

Don Q may also refer to:

- Don Q (rapper), an American rapper
- Don Q, Son of Zorro, a 1925 silent film
- Don Q, a 2023 film starring Armand Assante.

== See also ==
- Don Quixote (disambiguation)
