= Don Quixote (Kennedy Center sculpture) =

Sculpture by Aurelio Teno

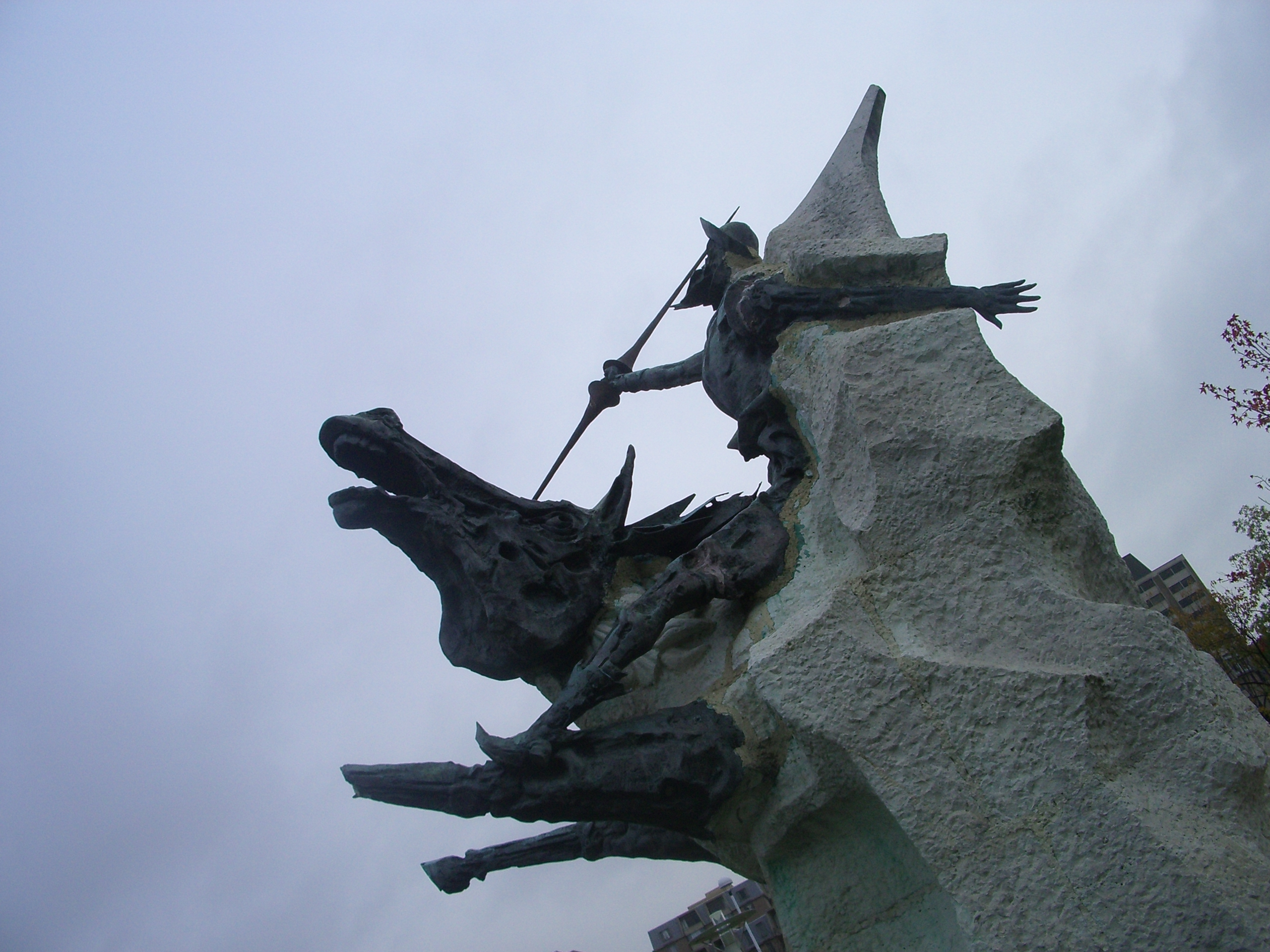
- Sculpture in 2006
- Artist: Aurelio Teno
- Year: 1976
- Type: Bronze
- Dimensions: 4.6 m × 1.8 m × 3.7 m (15 ft × 6 ft × 12 ft)
- Location: Kennedy Center, Washington, D.C., United States; 38.89693°N 77.05459°W
- Owner: National Park Service

Don Quixote is a 1976 sculpture by Aurelio Teno located at the northeast corner of the Kennedy Center in Washington, D.C. The sculpture of Don Quixote and his horse Rocinante was a gift from Spain for the United States Bicentennial.

In 1993, the Smithsonian Institution's Save Outdoor Sculpture! program surveyed and assessed the work and found that it needed treatment.

== Description ==
Don Quixote depicts a bronze and stone figure of Don Quixote wearing a full suit of armor riding his horse Rocinante which emerges from a jagged piece of stone. The jagged stone is Colmenar stone from Pamplona. Only the front portion of Don Quixote and his horse are visible. The horse appears to be charging forward out of the stone with his head raised, mouth open, and hooves kicking. The left foot of the horse is not formed, intentionally, by Teno. In Don Quixote's hand is a 12 feet (3.7 m) lance of steel. Both figures are loosely modeled and the figures and stone rest on a 66 short tons (60,000 kg) oval base measuring 4 by 5 by 12 feet (1.2 m × 1.5 m × 3.7 m) which was cut into three pieces for transport by ship to the United States.

An inscription on the sculpture reads SCULPTOR / A. TENO / MADRID / ESPAÑA – 1976.

== Acquisition ==
King Juan Carlos I and Queen Sofía presented the sculpture June 3, 1976, on behalf of Spain to the United States in honor of its bicentennial.

== About the artist ==
Spanish artist Aurelio Teno started his professional sculpture career at age eight. He described Don Quixote as his life's work, having devoted his career to creating art about the subject.

== See also ==
- List of public art in Washington, D.C., Ward 2
- Statues of the Liberators
