= Rocinante =

Don Quixote's horse

Rocinante (Rozinante)
- Don Quixote character
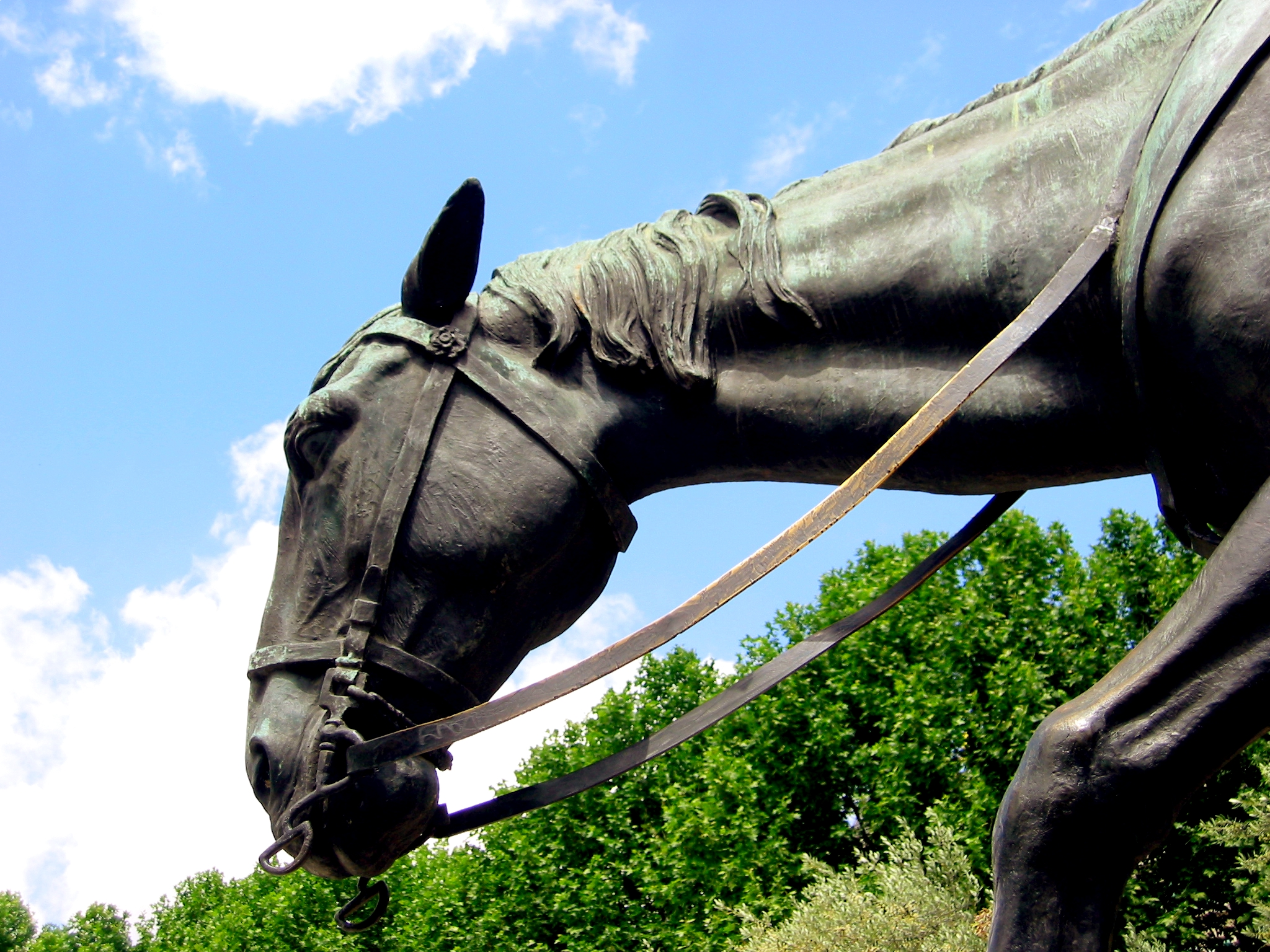
- Rocinante. Detail of the Cervantes monument in Madrid (L. Coullaut, 1930)
- Created by: Miguel de Cervantes

In-universe information
- Species: Horse
- Gender: Male

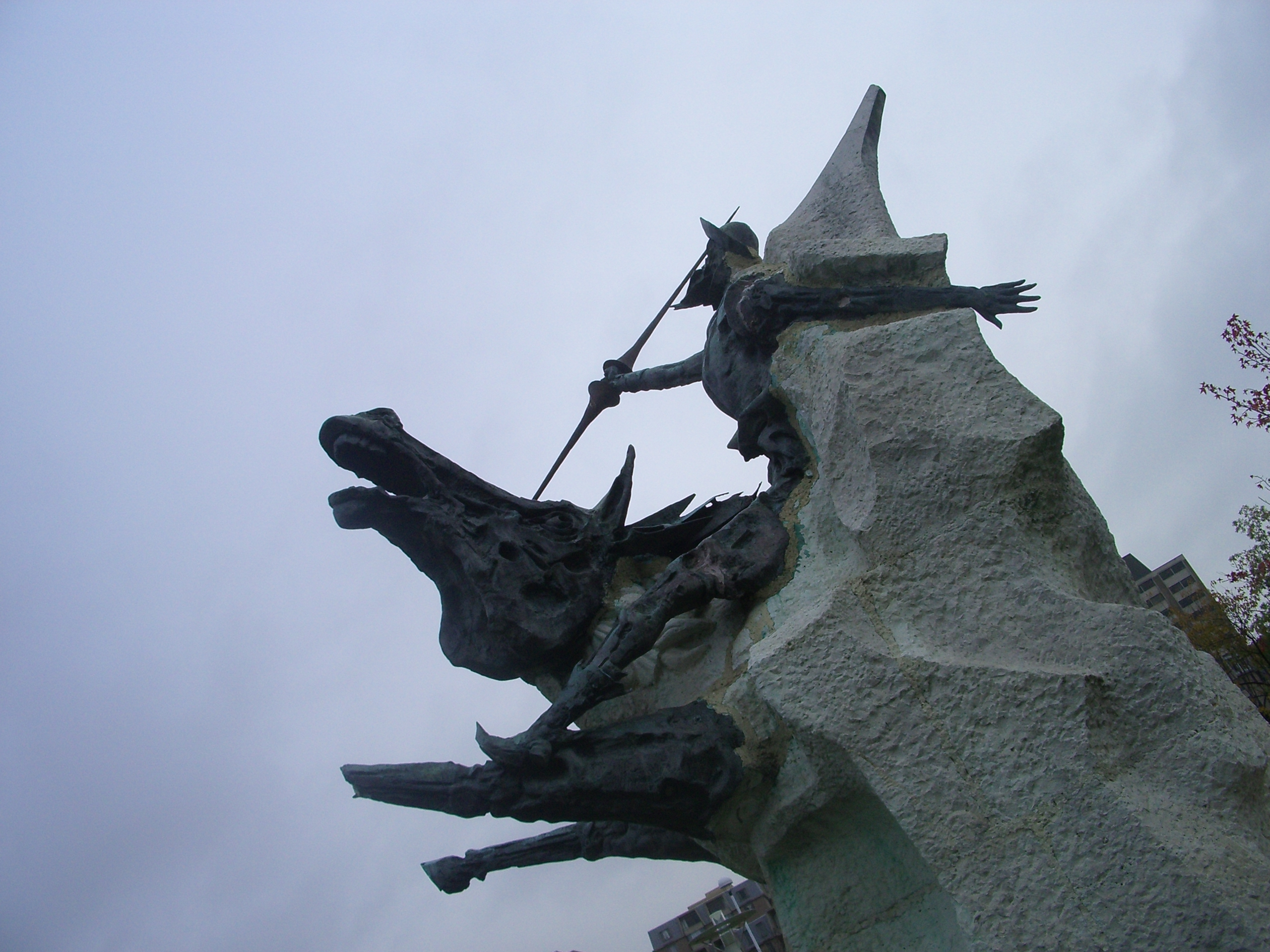
Don Quixote, a 1976 statue by Aurelio Teno exhibited in Washington, D.C., portrays Rocinante and Don Quixote as emerging from a rock ready for battle

Rocinante (Rozinante) (Spanish pronunciation: [roθiˈnante]) is Don Quixote's horse in the 1605/1615 novel Don Quixote by Miguel de Cervantes. In many ways, Rozinante is not only Don Quixote's horse, but also his double; like Don Quixote, he is awkward, past his prime, and engaged in a task beyond his capacities.

== Etymology ==
Rocín in Spanish means a work horse or low-quality horse, but can also mean an illiterate or rough man. There are similar words in English (rouncey), French (roussin or roncin; rosse), Portuguese (rocim), and Italian (ronzino). The etymology is uncertain.

The name is a complex pun. In Spanish, ante has several meanings and can function as a standalone word as well as a suffix. One meaning is 'before' or 'previously'. Another is 'in front of'. As a suffix, -ante in Spanish is adverbial; rocinante refers to functioning as, or being, a rocín. Rocinante, then, follows Cervantes's pattern of using ambiguous, multivalent words, which is common throughout the novel.

Rocinante's name, then, signifies his change in status from the "old nag" of before to the "foremost" steed. As Cervantes describes Don Quixote's choice of name: nombre, a su parecer, alto, sonoro y significativo de lo que había sido cuando fue rocín, antes de lo que ahora era, que era antes y primero de todos los rocines del mundo—"a name, to his thinking, lofty, sonorous, and significant of his condition as a hack before he became what he now was, the first and foremost of all the hacks in the world".

In chapter 1, Cervantes describes Don Quixote's careful naming of his steed:

Four days were spent in thinking what name to give him, because (as he said to himself) it was not right that a horse belonging to a knight so famous, and one with such merits of his own, should be without some distinctive name, and he strove to adapt it so as to indicate what he had been before belonging to a knight-errant, and what he then was."

== In popular culture ==
- Tintin briefly rides a horse he calls Rosinante in Tintin in the Land of the Soviets, the first volume in The Adventures of Tintin, published in 1929–30.
- Rocinante is the name of the camper truck used by author John Steinbeck in his 1960 cross-country road trip, which is depicted in his 1962 travelogue Travels with Charley.
- The progressive rock band Rush sing about the ship Rocinante in both "Cygnus X-1 Book I: The Voyage" and "Cygnus X-1 Book II: Hemispheres" on the albums A Farewell to Kings and Hemispheres respectively.
- Rocinante is the name of Monsignor Quixote's car in Graham Greene's 1982 novel Monsignor Quixote.
- Rozinante is the name Dervla Murphy gives her bicycle in her famous 1965 cycle-touring journal Full Tilt: Ireland to India with a Bicycle.
- In the novel series The Expanse and its TV series adaptation, the Rocinante is the new name given to a Martian gunship that becomes the primary setting for much of the series.
- In the television series Once Upon a Time, which is based upon retellings of literary classics, Rocinante is the name of the horse belonging to a young Regina/Evil Queen.
- Finnish actor Jukka Leisti created a children's TV programme around his knight character Tuttiritari (The Pacifier Knight). Tuttiritari rides "a horse" called Rusinante. The name of the horse is a word play—a blend word or a portmanteau—a combination of Rosinante (Rocinante) and the Finnish word for raisin, rusina.
- In the manga One Piece there is a character named Donquixote Rocinante, he is the little brother of Donquixote Doflamingo.
- In the television series Psych, Season 3 Episode 10 "Six Feet Under The Sea", a smuggler's plane is named "Rocinante".
- In the video game Limbus Company, a character named Don Quixote has "ROCINANTE" written on the sides of her running shoes. The shoes are actually a manifestation of Rocinante itself, and appears to have some form of sentience, acting as a cover of her true identity.
- In the 1995 Bungie game Marathon 2: Durandal, the AI Durandal names his new flagship the Rozinante.
- In the anime Legend of the Galactic Heroes, a smuggler's merchant spaceship is named Rocinante.
- In the 2026 game Fire Emblem: Fortune's Weave, the recruitable character Io rides a horse named "Rocinan".

== See also ==
- El rucio, Sancho Panza's donkey.
- Clavileño, a wooden horse ridden by Don Quixote and Sancho in one of their adventures.
- Don Quixote, 1955 drawing by Pablo Picasso
- List of fictional horses
- Hipparion rocinantis, an extinct equine found in La Mancha and named after Rocinante.
