= Mark Thornhill =

British civil servant (1822–1900)

Mark Bensley Thornhill (25 April 1822 – 14 March 1900) was the British district magistrate and collector of the district of Mathura, Uttar Pradesh, India, at the onset of the Indian Rebellion of 1857.

In early 1857, he was the first to report what he thought was an unusual movement of chapatis.

He wrote Indian fairy tales (1879) and his memoirs The Personal Adventures and Experiences of a Magistrate During the Rise, Progress, and Suppression of the Indian Mutiny (1884).

== Early life and education ==
Mark Bensley Thornhill was born on 25 April 1822 in Stanmore, Middlesex, to John and Henriette. In 1840 he passed the general examinations at the East India College, Haileybury. There, he won medals in classics, political economy, and law.

== Career ==
In December 1840, he arrived in India, where he was appointed to the Indian Civil Service. In 1842, he was posted as assistant to the commissioner of Allahabad. In 1844, he became assistant magistrate to the collector of Delhi.

He was posted as district magistrate and collector of the district of Mathura in 1854, and was in that position at the onset of the Indian Rebellion in 1857. Historian John William Kaye noted that Thornhill had recorded in his memoirs what he thought was an unusual movement of chapatis in early 1857. The first to report the occurrence, Thornhill also documented that a similar movement of chapatis had occurred just prior to the Vellore Mutiny.

In 1879, he published Indian fairy tales. In 1884, he published his memoirs titled The Personal Adventures and Experiences of a Magistrate During the Rise, Progress, and Suppression of the Indian Mutiny.

== Personal and family ==
His brother was the secretary to the lieutenant-governor at Agra.

== Death ==
He died on 14 March 1900 in the Isle of Wight.

== Selected publications ==
- The Personal Adventures and Experiences of a Magistrate During the Rise, Progress, and Suppression of the Indian Mutiny. London: J. Murray. 1884.
- Indian fairy tales. London: Hatchards. 1888.
