= Don Quixote Pond =

Pond in Victoria Land, Antarctica

Don Quixote Pond (77°32′S 161°7′E) is a pond located 1.1 nautical miles (2 km) northeast of Dais Col in North Fork, Wright Valley, Victoria Land. A whimsical name, after Don Quixote, applied in juxtaposition to Don Juan Pond. The name appears in various reports on the locality published in the 1970s, including those by Keros Cartwright and Henry Harris of the Illinois State Geological Survey, who studied the hydrogeology of this area in three field seasons, 1973–76.
