= Don Quixote (Picasso) =

1955 sketch by Pablo Picasso

- Artist: Pablo Picasso
- Year: 1955

Don Quixote is a 1955 sketch by Pablo Picasso of the Spanish literary hero and his sidekick, Sancho Panza. It was featured on the August 18–24 issue of the French weekly journal Les Lettres Françaises in celebration of the 350th anniversary of the first part, published in 1605, of the Miguel de Cervantes novel Don Quixote. Made on August 10, 1955, the drawing Don Quixote was in a very different style than Picasso's earlier Blue, Rose, and Cubist periods.

== Details ==
The drawing is of Don Quixote de la Mancha, his horse Rocinante, his squire Sancho Panza and his donkey Dapple, the Sun, and several windmills. The bold lines, almost scribbles, that compose the figures are stark against a plain, white background. The figures are deformed and dramatic. A small, round Sancho Panza looks up at a tall, gaunt Don Quixote, who, in turn, gazes forward. Don Quixote and Rocinante stand nobly, but have a somewhat tired air. The figure, painted with heavy strokes, seems to have been changed multiple times as Picasso painted Don Quixote's torso, arms and shoulder. "The knight's head, capped by what would be Mambrino's helmet, is connected to his shoulders by a neck made with a single, thin line, and it sports a pointed nose and a long, equally thin goatee. He carries a lance in his right hand and the reins and a circular shield apparently in his left. Rocinante is the bag of bones described by Cervantes. Panza appears to the left, a black mass vaguely defining his round body, and sitting on Dapple who has a long, wiry neck and thin, long ears. Little attention seems to have been paid to Panza sketched in the same vein, perhaps because Don Quixote is the center of attention. Though the two figures seem to be standing still, the drawing is full of movement; the lines are exuberant and the overall effect is catchy and one of bright humor."

== Oil painting March 3, 1947 ==
There is a claim that the drawing was made from sketches of Picasso's earlier painting created in 1947. This painting is oil on canvas and has been verified through pigment analysis, carbon dating, and Kodak slides evaluations confirming that the oil painting pre-dates the Indian ink drawing from 1955.

== The original ==
In July 2010, Georgian art critics, including Dali Lebanidze, scientist of the G. Chubinashvili National Center of Art History Research and Fixation, claimed to have found the long-lost original drawing the design that appeared in the French magazine in a family's home in Tbilisi. The family received the drawing from a relative abroad and believed that it was a print of the iconic image.

While the graphic today is generally depicted in a stark black and white, the image that appeared in the weekly journal was in a gray tone. The Don Quixote in the Georgian family's home was in a blue-green paint, which would have created the gray tones of the journal print. Attention caught by the unusual color and the apparent old age of the frame, Lebanidze decided to examine it more closely.

He soon came to the conclusion that the supposed print was in fact the original drawn by Picasso, saying, "The placement of ink on the paper, the incredible energy of the artist’s manner, the complete freedom of lines that reflects inner emotion of the artist – all indicated to the fact that it was the original. It is impossible to achieve such freedom, to repeat or copy such spontaneous character of the picture."

However, aside from the gushing possibility the original has been found at long last, nearly two years after the above-referenced "discovery", no independent scientific, forensic or critical judgment has been published nor has a high-resolution image been released by Lebanidze or any official of the National Center of Art History Research and Fixation. Furthermore, a search of the website (gch-centre.ge) returns not a single reference to the iconic Picasso ink-wash, lending credibility to the assumption that this "discovery" is apocryphal and no more valid than the unproven claim that the original Quixote drawing has been locked inside a St. Denis Church basement safe in France since its creation in 1955.

In May 2022, a contradicting claim was made by Keith Coppola, a New Jersey art collector, who claims to have found the original, dated 11 February 1955, in an estate sale. As of May 2022, Coppola's attempts to have his version authenticated by the Picasso estate have been unsuccessful.

== Black-and-white color ==
If the Don Quixote found in Tbilisi is in fact the original, several interesting questions about the intended coloring and shading are raised. In black and white, the image is stark, simple, and evenly bold. The lighter, bluish ink tone adds a complexity to the picture with different shades and differences in bold and lighter lines. In this version, Don Quixote, Rocinante, the windmill standing between Don Quixote and Sancho Panza, and the ground lines are darker and bolder, emphasizing those features. Everything else, including Sancho Panza, the other windmills, and the Sun, are lighter and more seem to fade into the background.

== Symbolism ==
This complexity is not seen in the grey journal print, nor in the currently popular black-and-white versions. But if this shading is deliberate, then new interpretations of Don Quixote can be inferred. According to Lebanidze, the dark elements of the drawing represent what has been transformed by Don Quixote's mind from the everyday to the mythical: himself and his horse into a heroic knight, a windmill into a giant, and the ground into the world of his imagination. The other subjects have been left in the sphere of reality, a world more distant and less visible to Don Quixote.

== Today ==
Today, the black-and-white version has become the more popular image of Don Quixote. It is widely recognized as one of the most prominent depictions of the legendary figure.
