= Arabic literature =

Arabic literature (Arabic: الأدب العربي / ALA-LC: al-Adab al-‘Arabī) is the writing, both as prose and poetry, produced by writers in the Arabic language. The Arabic word used for literature is Adab, which comes from a meaning of etiquette, and which implies politeness, culture and enrichment.

Arabic literature, primarily transmitted orally, began to be documented in written form in the 7th century, with only fragments of written Arabic appearing before then.

The Qur'an would have the greatest lasting effect on Arab culture and its literature. Arabic literature flourished during the Islamic Golden Age, but has remained vibrant to the present day, with poets and prose-writers across the Arab world, as well as in the Arab diaspora, achieving increasing success.

Based on the important number of surviving Islamic manuscripts, with a large part of them being in Arabic, Dutch Arabist Jan Just Witkam has argued that "Arabic traditional literature is probably the largest body of literature in the world."

== History ==
=== Pre-Islamic poetry ===
Pre-Islamic Arabic poetry is referred to in traditional Arabic literature as al-shiʿr al-Jāhilī, "poetry from the Jahiliyyah". In pre-Islamic Arabia, markets such as Souq Okaz, in addition to Souq Majanna and Souq Dhi al-Majāz, were destinations for caravans from throughout the peninsula. At these markets poetry was recited, and the dialect of the Quraysh, the tribe in control of Souq Okaz of Mecca, became predominant.

Days of the Arabs, tales in both meter and prose, contains the oldest extant Arabic narratives, focusing on battles and raids. Poets were spokesmen of the tribe and propagandists who rallied warriors, attacking rivals through hijāʾ and satire, and preserved historical records of battles, genealogies, and diplomacy. The poetry of Antarah ibn Shaddad of Banu Abs and Amr ibn Kulthum of Taghlib preserved tribal ideals of honour, lineage, warfare, and collective memory.

==== Poets ====
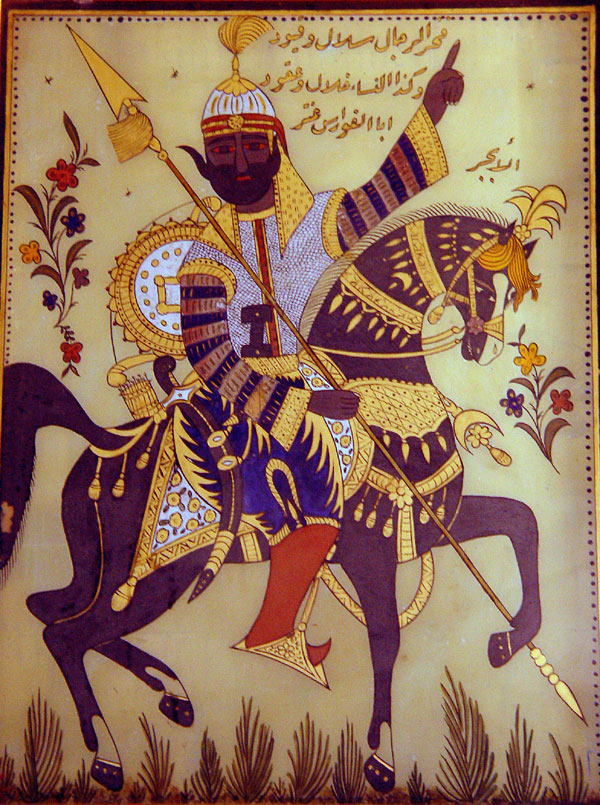
Portrayal of the Jahili period poet-knight Antarah ibn Shaddad.

Notable poets of the pre-Islamic period were Abu Layla al-Muhalhel and Al-Shanfara. There were also the poets of the Mu'allaqat, or "the suspended ones", a group of poems said to have been on display in Mecca. These poets are Imru' al-Qais, Tarafah ibn al-‘Abd, 'Abid ibn al-Abras, Harith ibn Hilliza, Amr ibn Kulthum, Zuhayr ibn Abi Sulma, Al-Nabigha al-Dhubiyānī, Antara Ibn Shaddad, al-A'sha al-Akbar, and Labīd ibn Rabī'ah.

Al-Khansa stood out in her poetry of rithā' or elegy. al-Hutay'ah was prominent for his madīh, or "panegyric", as well as his hijā', or "invective".

==== Prose ====
As literature was transmitted orally and not written, prose represents little of what has been passed down. The main forms were parables (المَثَل al-mathal), speeches (الخطابة al-khitāba), and stories (القِصَص al-qisas).

Quss Ibn Sa'ida al-Iyadi was a notable Arab ruler, writer, and orator. Aktham ibn Sayfi was also one of the most famous rulers of the Arabs, as well as one of their most renowned speech-givers.

=== The Qur'an ===
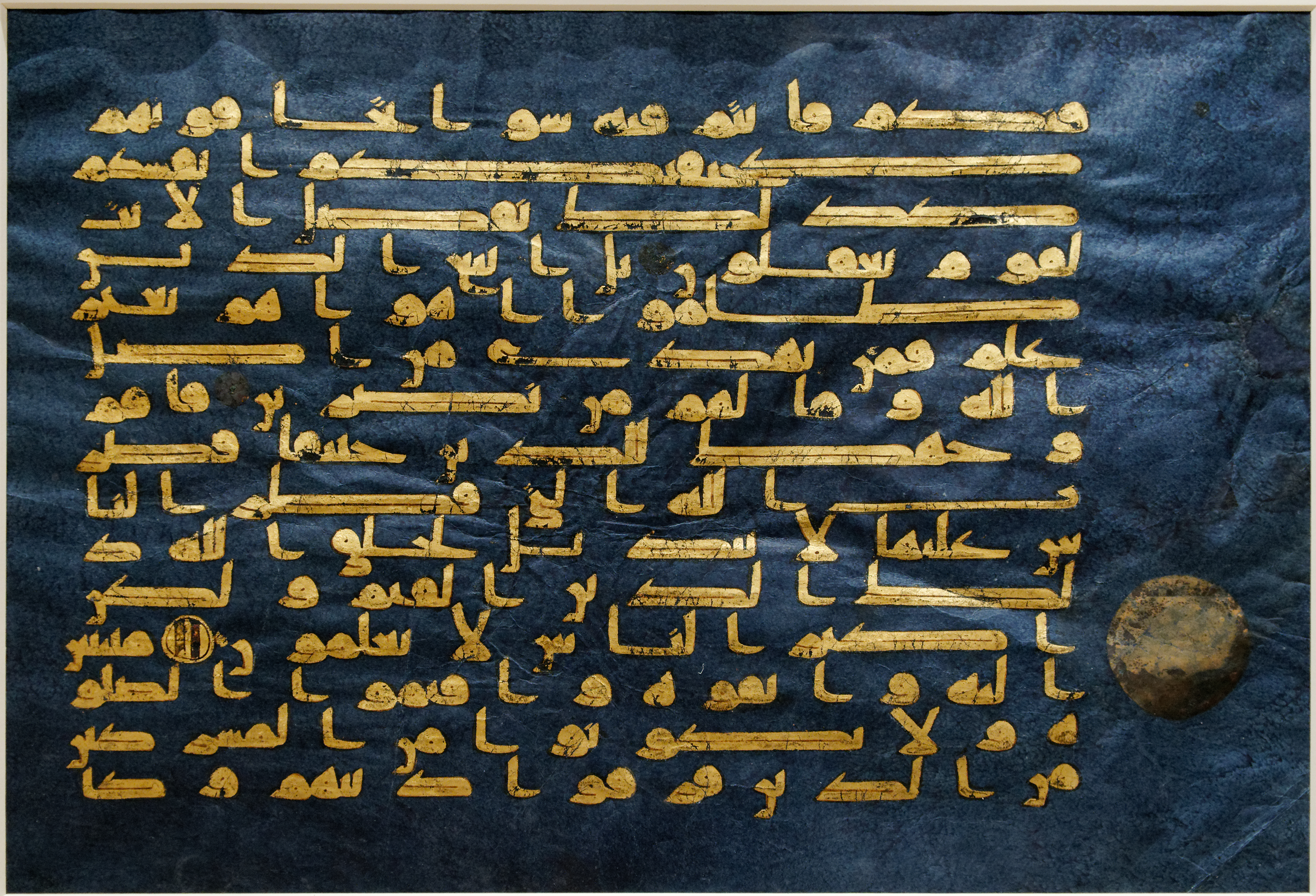
The Qur'an is one of the most influential examples of Arabic literature

The Qur'an, the main holy book of Islam, is believed by Muslims to be divine revelation from God to Muhammad, and later, canonized by Uthman. The Quran had a significant influence on the Arabic language, and marked the beginning of Islamic literature. Muslims believe it was transcribed in the Arabic dialect of the Quraysh, the tribe of Muhammad. As Islam spread, the Quran was used to help unify and standardize Arabic.

The Quran is the earliest surviving Arabic literature, with 114 surahs (chapters) containing 6,236 ayat (verses). It is presented in the divine voice, and covers genres including injunction, narrative, parable, law, and more. Surahs are classified as Meccan or Medinan depending on if they were produced in Mecca or Medina, before or after the Hijra. The genre of the Quran is a matter of debate, considered by some to be homily. It has also been compared to, and sometimes considered, a form of pre-Islamic rhymed prose called Saj. According to the Islamic doctrine of i'jaz (inimitability), inspired by verses in the Quran itself (for example, Quran 11:13) the style of the Quran is not replicable, which has led to the challenge of producing imitations of the Quran. Some Muslims believe that trying to imitate the Quran is forbidden according to Quran 26:224-227.

=== Rashidi ===
Under the Rashidun, or the "rightly guided caliphs," literary centers developed in the Hijaz, in cities such as Mecca and Medina; in the Levant, in Damascus; and in Iraq, in Kufa and Basra. Literary production—and poetry in particular—in this period served the spread of Islam. There was also poetry to praise brave warriors, to inspire soldiers in jihad, and rithā' to mourn those who fell in battle. Notable poets of this rite include Ka'b ibn Zuhayr, Hasan ibn Thabit, Abu Dhu'ayb al-Hudhali, and Nābigha al-Ja‘dī.

There was also poetry for entertainment often in the form of ghazal. Notables of this movement were Jamil ibn Ma'mar, Layla al-Akhyaliyya, and Umar Ibn Abi Rabi'ah.

=== Umayyad ===
The First Fitna, which created the Shia–Sunni split over the rightful caliph, had a great impact on Arabic literature. Whereas Arabic literature—along with Arab society—was greatly centralized in the time of Muhammad and the Rashidun, it became fractured at the beginning of the period of the Umayyad Caliphate, as power struggles led to tribalism. Arabic literature at this time reverted to its state in al-Jahiliyyah, with markets such as Kinasa near Kufa and Mirbad near Basra, where poetry in praise and admonishment of political parties and tribes was recited. Poets and scholars found support and patronage under the Umayyads, but the literature of this period was limited in that it served the interests of parties and individuals, and as such was not a free art form.

Notable writers of this political poetry include Al-Akhtal al-Taghlibi, Jarir ibn Atiyah, Al-Farazdaq, Al-Kumayt ibn Zayd al-Asadi, Tirimmah ibn Hakim, and Ubayd Allah ibn Qays al-Ruqayyat.

There were also poetic forms of rajaz—mastered by al-Ajjaj and Ru'ba ibn al-Ajjaj—and ar-Rā'uwīyyāt, or "pastoral poetry"—mastered by al-Ra'i al-Numayri and Dhu ar-Rumma.

=== Abbasid ===
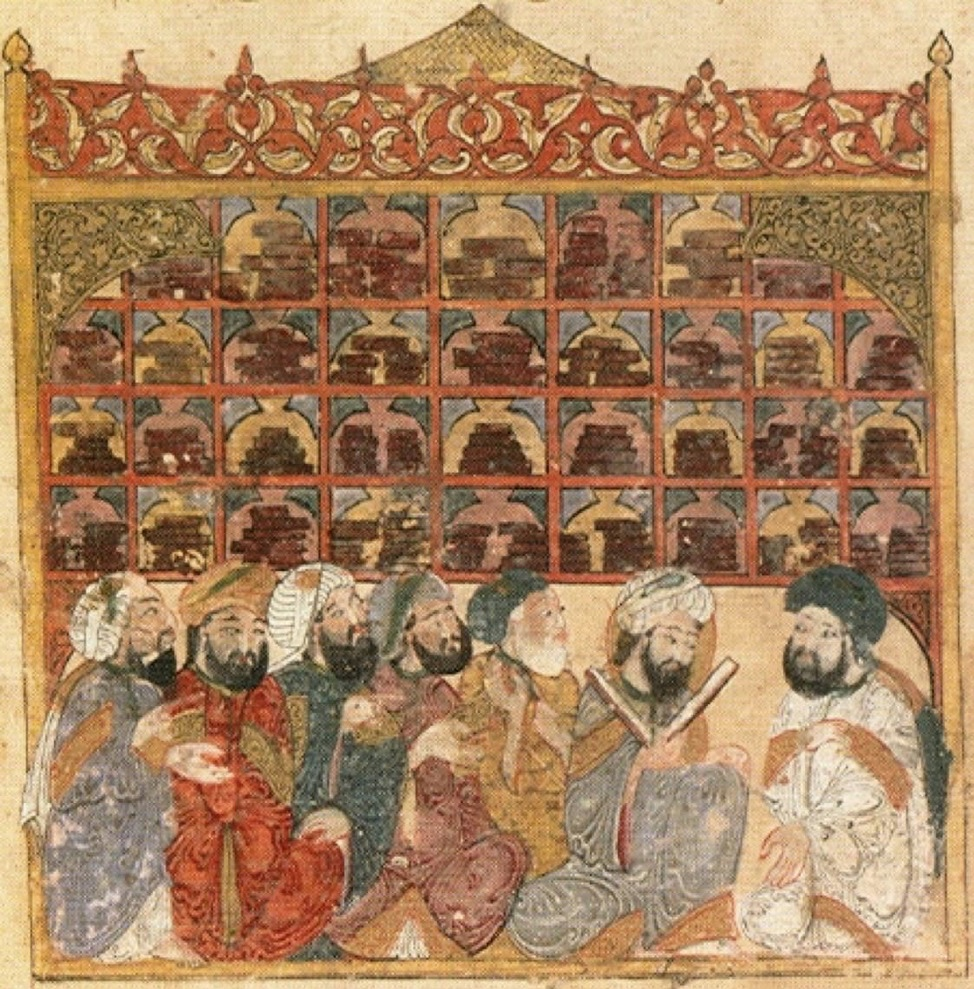
An illustration of the House of Wisdom by Yahya ibn Mahmud al-Wasiti in a manuscript of the Maqama of Al-Hariri.

The Abbasid period is generally recognized as the beginning of the Islamic Golden Age, and was a time of significant literary production. The House of Wisdom in Baghdad hosted numerous scholars and writers such as Al-Jahiz and Omar Khayyam. A number of stories in the One Thousand and One Nights feature the Abbasid caliph Harun al-Rashid. Al-Hariri of Basra was a notable literary figure of this period.

Some of the important poets in Abbasid literature were: Bashshar ibn Burd, Abu Nuwas, Abu-l-'Atahiya, Muslim ibn al-Walid, Abbas Ibn al-Ahnaf, and al-Husayn ibn al-Dahhak.

=== Andalusi ===
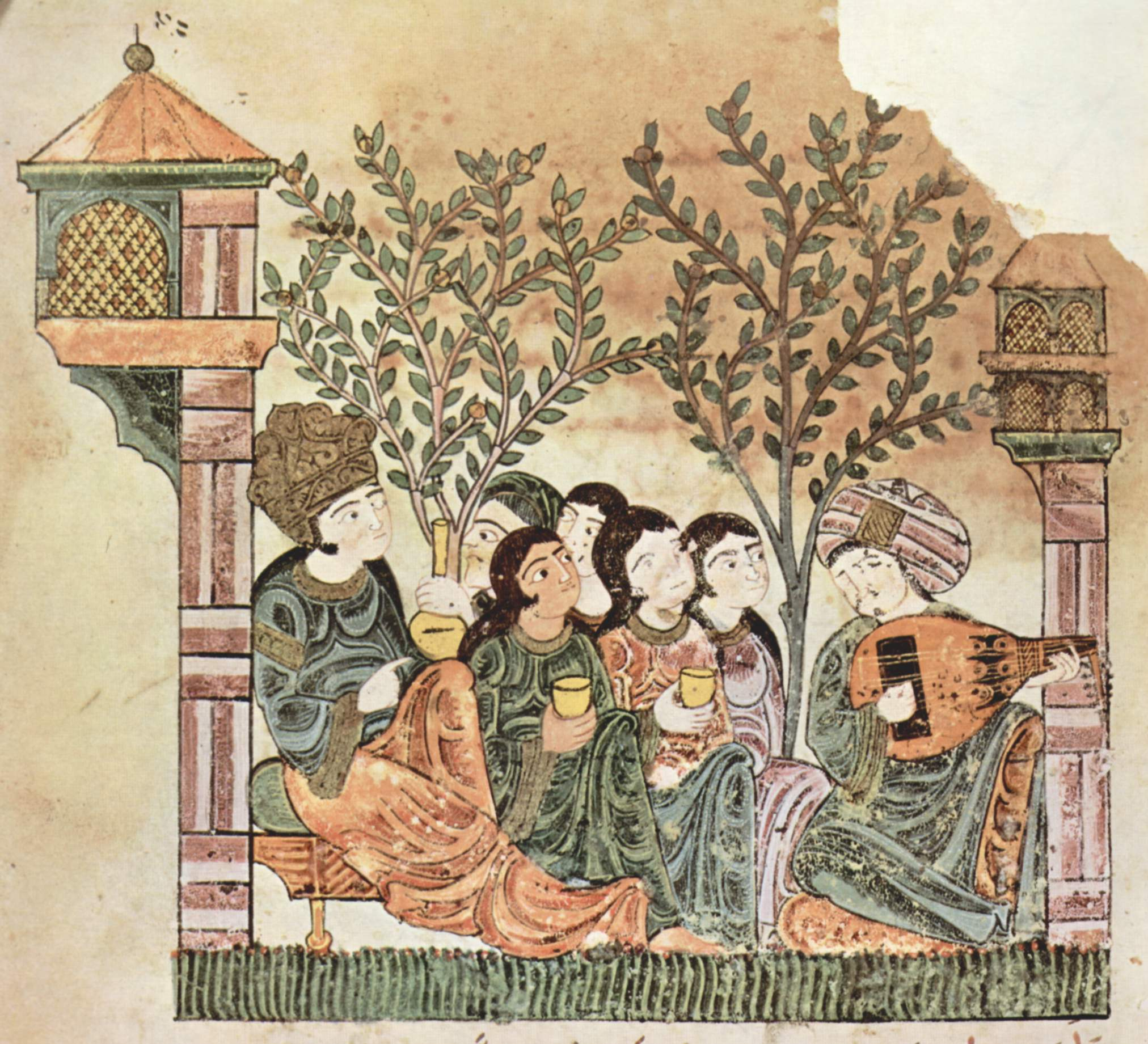
An image from the manuscript of Hadith Bayad wa Riyad (13th century).

Andalusi literature was produced in Al-Andalus, or Islamic Iberia, from its Muslim conquest in 711 to either the Catholic conquest of Granada in 1492 or the Expulsion of the Moors ending in 1614. Ibn Abd Rabbih's Al-ʿIqd al-Farīd (The Unique Necklace) and Ibn Tufail's Hayy ibn Yaqdhan were influential works of literature from this tradition. Notable literary figures of this period include Ibn Hazm, Ziryab, Ibn Zaydun, Wallada bint al-Mustakfi, Al-Mu'tamid ibn Abbad, Ibn Bajja, Al-Bakri, Ibn Rushd, Hafsa bint al-Hajj al-Rukuniyya, Ibn Tufail, Ibn Arabi, Ibn Quzman, Abu al-Baqa ar-Rundi, and Ibn al-Khatib. The muwashshah and zajal were important literary forms in al-Andalus.

The rise of Arabic literature in al-Andalus occurred in dialogue with the golden age of Jewish culture in Iberia. Most Jewish writers in al-Andalus—while incorporating elements such as rhyme, meter, and themes of classical Arabic poetry—created poetry in Hebrew, but Samuel ibn Naghrillah, Joseph ibn Naghrela, and Ibn Sahl al-Isra'ili wrote poetry in Arabic. Maimonides wrote his landmark Dalãlat al-Hā'irīn (The Guide for the Perplexed) in Arabic using the Hebrew alphabet.

=== Maghrebi ===
Fatima al-Fihri founded al-Qarawiyiin University in Fes in 859, recognised as the first university in the world. Particularly from the beginning of the 12th century, with sponsorship from the Almoravid dynasty, the university played an important role in the development of literature in the region, welcoming scholars and writers from throughout the Maghreb, al-Andalus, and the Mediterranean Basin. Among the scholars who studied and taught there were Ibn Khaldoun, al-Bitruji, Ibn Hirzihim (Sidi Harazim), Ibn al-Khatib, and Al-Wazzan (Leo Africanus) as well as the Jewish theologian Maimonides. Sufi literature played an important role in literary and intellectual life in the region from this early period, such as Muhammad al-Jazuli's book of prayers Dala'il al-Khayrat.

The Zaydani Library, the library of the Saadi Sultan Zidan Abu Maali, was stolen by Spanish privateers in the 16th century and kept at the El Escorial Monastery.

=== Mamluk ===
During the Mamluk Sultanate, Ibn Abd al-Zahir and Ibn Kathir were notable writers of history.

=== Ottoman ===
Significant poets of Arabic literature in the time of the Ottoman Empire included ash-Shab adh-Dharif, Al-Busiri author of "Al-Burda", Ibn al-Wardi (died 1349), Safi al-Din al-Hilli, and Ibn Nubata. Abd al-Ghani al-Nabulsi wrote on various topics including theology and travel.

=== Nahda ===
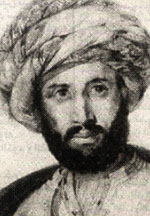
Rifa'a at-Tahtawi oversaw an unprecedented translation program in Khedivate Egypt

During the 19th century, a revival took place in Arabic literature, along with much of Arabic culture, and is referred to in Arabic as "al-Nahda", which means "the renaissance". There was a strand of neoclassicism in the Nahda, particularly among writers such as Tahtawi, Shidyaq, Yaziji, and Muwaylihi, who believed in the iḥyāʾ "reanimation" of Arabic literary heritage and tradition.

The translation of foreign literature was a major element of the Nahda period. An important translator of the 19th century was Rifa'a al-Tahtawi, who founded the School of Languages (also knowns as School of Translators) in 1835 in Cairo. In the 20th century, Jabra Ibrahim Jabra, a Palestinian-Iraqi intellectual living mostly in Bagdad, translated works by William Shakespeare, Oscar Wilde, Samuel Beckett or William Faulkner, among many others.

This resurgence of new writing in Arabic was confined mainly to cities in Syria, Egypt and Lebanon until the 20th century, when it spread to other countries in the region. This cultural renaissance was not only felt within the Arab world, but also beyond, with a growing interest in translating of Arabic works into European languages. Although the use of the Arabic language was revived, particularly in poetry, many of the tropes of the previous literature, which served to make it so ornate and complicated, were dropped.

Just as in the 8th century, when a movement to translate ancient Greek and other literature had helped vitalise Arabic literature, another translation movement during this period would offer new ideas and material for Arabic literature. An early popular success was The Count of Monte Cristo, which spurred a host of historical novels on similar Arabic subjects. Jurji Zaydan and Niqula Haddad were important writers of this genre.

==== Poetry ====
During the Nahda, poets like Francis Marrash, Ahmad Shawqi and Hafiz Ibrahim began to explore the possibility of developing the classical poetic forms. Some of these neoclassical poets were acquainted with Western literature but mostly continued to write in classical forms, while others, denouncing blind imitation of classical poetry and its recurring themes, sought inspiration from French or English romanticism.

The next generation of poets, the so-called Romantic poets, began to absorb the impact of developments in Western poetry to a far greater extent, and felt constrained by Neoclassical traditions which the previous generation had tried to uphold. The Mahjari poets were emigrants who mostly wrote in the Americas, but were similarly beginning to experiment further with the possibilities of Arabic poetry. This experimentation continued in the Middle East throughout the first half of the 20th century.

Prominent poets of the Nahda, or "Renaissance," were Nasif al-Yaziji; Mahmoud Sami el-Baroudi, Ḥifnī Nāṣif, Ismāʻīl Ṣabrī, and Hafez Ibrahim; Ahmed Shawqi; Jamil Sidqi al-Zahawi, Maruf al Rusafi, Fawzi al-Ma'luf, and Khalil Mutran.

==== Prose ====
Rifa'a at-Tahtawi, who lived in Paris from 1826 to 1831, wrote A Paris Profile about his experiences and observations and published it in 1834. Butrus al-Bustani founded the journal Al-Jinan in 1870 and started writing the first encyclopedia in Arabic: Da'irat ul-Ma'arif in 1875. Ahmad Faris al-Shidyaq published a number of influential books and was the editor-in-chief of ar-Ra'id at-Tunisi in Tunis and founder of Al-Jawa'ib in Istanbul.

Adib Ishaq spent his career in journalism and theater, working for the expansion of the press and the rights of the people. Jamāl ad-Dīn al-Afghānī and Muhammad Abduh founded the revolutionary anti-colonial pan-Islamic journal Al-Urwah al-Wuthqa, Abd al-Rahman al-Kawakibi, Qasim Amin, and Mustafa Kamil were reformers who influenced public opinion with their writing. Saad Zaghloul was a revolutionary leader and a renowned orator appreciated for his eloquence and reason.

Ibrahim al-Yaziji founded the newspaper an-Najah (النجاح "Achievement") in 1872, the magazine At-Tabib, the magazine Al-Bayan, and the magazine Ad-Diya and translated the Bible into Arabic.Walī ad-Dīn Yakan launched a newspaper called al-Istiqama (الاستقامة, " Righteousness") to challenge Ottoman authorities and push for social reforms, but they shut it down in the same year. Mustafa Lutfi al-Manfaluti, who studied under Muhammad Abduh at Al-Azhar University, was a prolific essayist and published many articles encouraging the people to reawaken and liberate themselves. Suleyman al-Boustani translated the Iliad into Arabic and commented on it. Khalil Gibran and Ameen Rihani were two major figures of the Mahjar movement within the Nahda. Jurji Zaydan founded Al-Hilal magazine in 1892, Yacoub Sarrouf founded Al-Muqtataf in 1876, Louis Cheikho founded the journal Al-Machriq in 1898. Other notable figures of the Nahda were Mostafa Saadeq Al-Rafe'ie and May Ziadeh.

Muhammad al-Kattani, founder of one of the first arabophone newspapers in Morocco, called At-Tā'ūn, and author of several poetry collections, was a leader of the Nahda in the Maghreb.

=== Modern literature ===
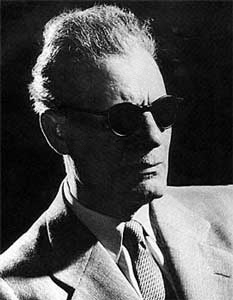
Taha Hussein, referred to as the "Dean of Arabic Literature" (Arabic: عميد الأدب العربي).

Beginning in the late 19th century, the Arabic novel became one of the most important forms of expression in Arabic literature. The rise of an efendiyya, an elite, secularist urban class with a Western education, gave way to new forms of literary expression: modern Arabic fiction. This new bourgeois class of literati used theater from the 1850s, starting in Lebanon, and the private press from the 1860s and 1870s to spread its ideas, challenge traditionalists, and establish its position in a rapidly transforming society.

The modern Arabic novel, particularly as a means of social critique and reform, has its roots in a deliberate departure from the traditionalist language and aesthetics of classical adab for "less embellished but more entertaining narratives." This direction began with translations from French and English, followed by social romances by Salīm al-Bustānī and other writers—particularly Christians. Khalil al-Khuri's narrative Way, Idhan Lastu bi-Ifranjī! (1859–1860) was an early example.

The emotionalism of early 20th century writers such as Mustafa Lutfi al-Manfaluti and Kahlil Gibran, who wrote with heavy moralism and sentimentality, equated the novel as a literary form with imported Western ideas and "shallow sentimentalism." Writers such as Muhammad Taimur of Al-Madrasa al-Ḥadītha "the Modern School," calling for an adab qawmī "national literature," largely avoided the novel and experimented with short stories instead. Mohammed Hussein Heikal's 1913 novel Zaynab was a compromise, as it included heavy sentimentality but portrayed local personality and characters.

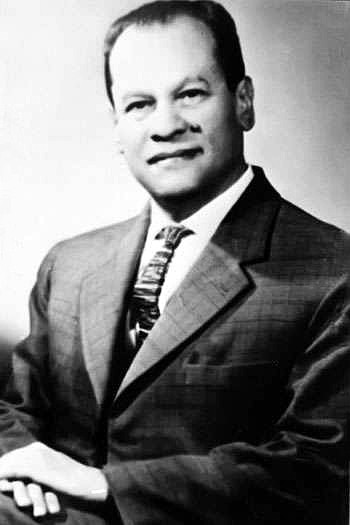
Naguib Mahfouz, Nobel prize laureate

Throughout the 20th century, Arabic writers in poetry, prose and theatre plays have reflected the changing political and social climate of the Arab world. Anti-colonial themes were prominent early in the 20th century, with writers continuing to explore the region's relationship with the West. Internal political upheaval has also been a challenge, with writers suffering censorship or persecution.

The interwar period featured writers such as Taha Hussein, author of Al-Ayyām, Ibrahim al-Mazini, Abbas Mahmoud al-Aqqad, and Tawfiq al-Hakim. The acceptance of suffering in al-Hakim's 1934 Awdat ar-rūḥ, is exemplary of the disappointment that prevailed over the idealism of the new middle class. As a result of increasing industrialization and urbanization, binary struggles such as the "materialism of the West" against the "spiritualism of the East," "progressive individuals and a backward, ignorant society," and "a city-versus-countryside divide" were common themes in the literature of this period and since.

There are many contemporary Arabic writers, such as Mahmoud Saeed (Iraq) who wrote Bin Barka Ally, and I Am The One Who Saw (Saddam City). Other contemporary writers include Sonallah Ibrahim and Abdul Rahman Munif, who were imprisoned by the government for their critical opinions. At the same time, others who had written works supporting or praising governments, were promoted to positions of authority within cultural bodies. Nonfiction writers and academics have also produced political polemics and criticisms aiming to re-shape Arabic politics. Some of the best known are Taha Hussein's The Future of Culture in Egypt, which was an important work of Egyptian nationalism, and the works of Nawal el-Saadawi, who campaigned for women's rights. Tayeb Salih from Sudan and Ghassan Kanafani from Palestine are two other writers who explored identity in relationship to foreign and domestic powers, the former writing about colonial/post-colonial relationships, and the latter on the repercussions of the Palestinian struggle.

==== Poetry ====
Mention no longer the driver on his night journey and the wide striding camels, and give up talk of morning dew and ruins.
I no longer have any taste for love songs on dwellings which already went down in seas of [too many] odes.
So, too, the ghada, whose fire, fanned by the sighs of those enamored of it, cries out to the poets: "Alas for my burning!"
If a steamer leaves with my friends on sea or land, why should I direct my complaints to the camels?

— Excerpt from Francis Marrash's Mashhad al-ahwal (1870), translated by Shmuel Moreh.

After World War II, there was a largely unsuccessful movement by several poets to write poems in free verse (shi'r hurr). Iraqi poets Badr Shakir al-Sayyab and Nazik Al-Malaika (1923–2007) are considered to be the originators of free verse in Arabic poetry. Most of these experiments were abandoned in favour of prose poetry, of which the first examples in modern Arabic literature are to be found in the writings of Francis Marrash, and of which two of the most influential proponents were Nazik al-Malaika and Iman Mersal. The development of modernist poetry also influenced poetry in Arabic. More recently, poets such as Adunis have pushed the boundaries of stylistic experimentation even further.

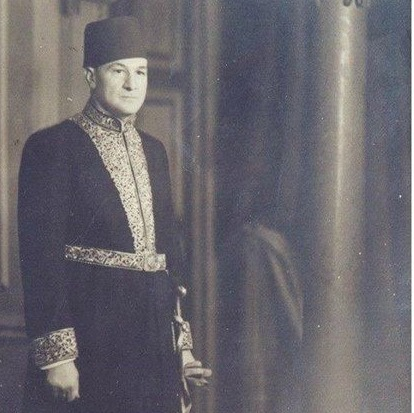
Aziz Pasha Abaza, poet from the aristocratic literary Egyptian family the House of Abaza of Circassian Abazin origin

An example of modern poetry in classical Arabic style with themes of Pan-Arabism is the work of Aziz Pasha Abaza. He came from Abaza family which produced notable Arabic literary figures including Ismail Pasha Abaza, Fekry Pasha Abaza, novelist Tharwat Abaza, Ismail Pasha Abaza and Desouky Pasha Abaza, among others.

Poetry retains a very important status in the Arab world. Mahmoud Darwish was regarded as the Palestinian national poet, and his funeral was attended by thousands of mourners. Syrian poet Nizar Qabbani addressed less political themes, but was regarded as a cultural icon, and his poems provide the lyrics for many popular songs.

==== Novels ====
Two distinct trends can be found in the nahda period of revival. The first was a neo-classical movement which sought to rediscover the literary traditions of the past, and was influenced by traditional literary genres—such as the maqama—and works like One Thousand and One Nights. In contrast, a modernist movement began by translating Western modernist works—primarily novels—into Arabic.

In the 19th century, individual authors in Syria, Lebanon and Egypt created original works by imitating classical narrative genres: Ahmad Faris Shidyaq with Leg upon Leg (1855), Khalil Khoury with Yes... so I am not a Frank (1859), Francis Marrash with The Forest of Truth (1865), Salim al-Bustani with At a Loss in the Levantine Gardens (1870), and Muhammad al-Muwaylihi with Isa ibn Hisham's Tale (1907). This trend was furthered by Jurji Zaydan (author of many historical novels), Khalil Gibran, Mikha'il Na'ima and Muhammad Husayn Haykal (author of Zaynab). Meanwhile, female writer Zaynab Fawwaz's first novel Ḥusn al-'Awāqib aw Ghādah al-Zāhirah (The Happy Ending, 1899) was also influential. According to the authors of the Encyclopedia of the Novel:

Almost each of the above [works] have been claimed as the first Arabic novel, which goes to suggest that the Arabic novel emerged from several rehearsals and multiple beginnings rather than from one single origin. Given that the very Arabic word "riwaya", which is now used exclusively in reference to the "novel", has traditionally conjured up a tangle of narrative genres [...], it might not be unfair to contend that the Arabic novel owes its early formation not only to the appropriation of the novel genre from Europe [...] but also, and more importantly, to the revival and transformation of traditional narrative genres in the wake of Napoleon's 1798 expedition into Egypt and the Arab world's firsthand encounter with industrialized imperial Europe.

A common theme in the modern Arabic novel is the study of family life with obvious resonances of the wider family of the Arabic world. Many of the novels have been unable to avoid the politics and conflicts of the region with war often acting as background to intimate family dramas. The works of Naguib Mahfuz depict life in Cairo, and his Cairo Trilogy, describing the struggles of a modern Cairene family across three generations, won him a Nobel prize for literature in 1988. He was the first Arabic writer to win the prize.

==== Plays ====
The musical plays of Lebanese Maroun Naccache from the mid-1800s are considered the birth of not only theatre in Lebanon, but also modern Arab theatre. Modern Arabic drama began to be written in the 19th century chiefly in Egypt and mainly influenced and in imitation of French works. It was not until the 20th century that it began to develop a distinctly Arab flavour and be seen elsewhere. The most important Arab playwright was Tawfiq al-Hakim whose first play was a re-telling of the Qur'anic story of the Seven Sleepers and the second an epilogue for the Thousand and One Nights. Other important dramatists of the region include Yusuf al-Ani from Iraq and Saadallah Wannous from Syria.

== Classical Arabic literature ==
=== Poetry ===
A large proportion of Arabic literature before the 20th century is in the form of poetry, and even prose from this period is either filled with snippets of poetry or is in the form of saj' or rhymed prose. The themes of the poetry range from high-flown hymns of praise to bitter personal attacks and from religious and mystical ideas to poems on women and wine. An important feature of the poetry which would be applied to all of the literature was the idea that it must be pleasing to the ear. The poetry and much of the prose was written with the design that it would be spoken aloud and great care was taken to make all writing as mellifluous as possible.

=== Religious scholarship ===
The research into the life and times of Muhammad, and determining the genuine parts of the sunnah, was an important early reason for scholarship in or about the Arabic language. It was also the reason for the collecting of pre-Islamic poetry; as some of these poets were close to the prophet—Labid meeting Muhammad and converting to Islam—and their writings illuminated the times when these events occurred. Muhammad also inspired the first Arabic biographies, known as Al-Sirah Al-Nabawiyyah; the earliest was by Wahb ibn Munabbih, but Muhammad ibn Ishaq wrote the best known. Whilst covering the life of the prophet they also told of the battles and events of early Islam and have numerous digressions on older biblical traditions.

Some of the earliest works studying the Arabic language were started in the name of Islam. Tradition has it that the caliph Ali, after reading a copy of the Qur'an with errors in it, asked Abu al-Aswad al-Du'ali to write a work codifying Arabic grammar. Khalil ibn Ahmad would later write Kitab al-Ayn, the first dictionary of Arabic, along with works on prosody and music, and his pupil Sibawayh would produce the most respected work of Arabic grammar known simply as al-Kitab or The Book.

Other caliphs followed after 'Abd al-Malik made Arabic the official language for the administration of the new empire, such as al-Ma'mun who set up the Bayt al-Hikma in Baghdad for research and translations. Basrah and Kufah were two other important seats of learning in the early Arab world, between which there was a strong rivalry.

The institutions set up mainly to investigate more fully the Islamic religion were invaluable in studying many other subjects. Caliph Hisham ibn Abd al-Malik was instrumental in enriching the literature by instructing scholars to translate works into Arabic. The first was probably Aristotle's correspondence with Alexander the Great translated by Salm Abu al-'Ala'. From the east, and in a very different literary genre, the scholar Abdullah Ibn al-Muqaffa translated the animal fables of the Panchatantra. These translations would keep alive scholarship and learning, particularly that of ancient Greece, during the Dark Ages in Europe and the works would often be first re-introduced to Europe from the Arabic versions.

=== Culinary ===
More medieval cookbooks have survived into the present day written in Arabic than in any other language. Classical Arabic culinary literature is comprised not only of cookbooks, there are also many works of scholarship, and descriptions of contemporary foods can be found in fictional and legendary tales like The Thousand and One Nights. Some of these texts predate Ibn Sayyar al-Warraq's Kitab al-Tabikh, the earliest known book of medieval Arabic cuisine. The Persian language Ḵusraw ī Kawādān ud rēdak-ēw, translated into Arabic after the conquest of the Sasanian Empire by Arab armies in the 7th century, was a guide to the sophisticated culinary and court culture of the time, written as a fictionalized narrative about an orphan descended from priestly roots who learns the ways of Khosrow I's court.

Early authors appear to have been familiar with the earlier works of Hippocrates, Rufus of Ephesus and Galen of Pergamum. Galen's On the Properties of Foodstuffs was translated into Arabic as Kitab al-aghdiya and was cited by all contemporary medical writers in the Caliphate during the reign of Abu Bakr al-Razi. Al-Razi was himself the author of an early text on food Manafi al-Aghdhiya wa Daf Madarriha (Book of the Benefits of Food, and Remedies against Its Harmful Effects). Interest in Galen's work was not limited only to Muslim scholars; Jewish scholar Abu Ya'qub Ishaḳ ibn Sulayman al-Isra'ili wrote Book on Foods (also in Arabic) in the same period. Rufus' original Greek language work has not survived into the present day, and it is only known to us from its Arabic translation.

=== Non-fiction literature ===
==== Compilations and manuals ====
In the late 9th century Ibn al-Nadim, a Baghdadi bookseller, compiled a crucial work in the study of Arabic literature. The Kitab al-Fihrist is a catalogue of all books available for sale in Baghdad, and it gives an overview of the state of the literature at that time. Considering the growing importance of literature, in the following centeries such compilations of authors and their works would become a tradition, an important work in the 17th century being Tadhkar al-Jami lil-Athar by Husayn ibn Muhammad al- Abbasi al-Nabhani al-Halabi which contains the names of some 24,000 writers.

One of the most common forms of literature during the Abbasid period was the compilation. These were collections of facts, ideas, instructive stories and poems on a single topic, and covers subjects as diverse as house and garden, women, gate-crashers, blind people, envy, animals and misers. These last three compilations were written by al-Jahiz, the acknowledged master of the form. These collections were important for any nadim, a companion to a ruler or noble whose role was often involved regaling the ruler with stories and information to entertain or advise.

A type of work closely allied to the collection was the manual in which writers like ibn Qutaybah offered instruction in subjects like etiquette, how to rule, how to be a bureaucrat and even how to write. Ibn Qutaybah also wrote one of the earliest histories of the Arabs, drawing together biblical stories, Arabic folk tales and more historical events.

The subject of sex was frequently investigated in Arabic literature. The ghazal or love poem had a long history, being at times tender and chaste and at other times rather explicit. In the Sufi tradition, the love poem would take on wider, mystical and religious importance. Sex manuals were also written such as The Perfumed Garden, Ṭawq al-Ḥamāmah or The Dove's Neckring by ibn Hazm and Nuzhat al-albab fi-ma la yujad fi kitab or Delight of Hearts Concerning What will Never Be Found in a Book by Ahmad al-Tifashi. Countering such works are one like Rawdat al-muhibbin wa-nuzhat al-mushtaqin or Meadow of Lovers and Diversion of the Infatuated by ibn Qayyim al-Jawziyyah who advises on how to separate love and lust and avoid sin.

==== Biography, history, and geography ====
Aside from the early biographies of Muhammad, the first major biographer to weigh character rather than just producing a hymn of praise was al-Baladhuri with his Kitab ansab al-ashraf or Book of the Genealogies of the Noble, a collection of biographies. Another important biographical dictionary was begun by ibn Khallikan and expanded by al-Safadi and one of the first significant autobiographies was Kitab al-I'tibar which told of Usamah ibn Munqidh and his experiences in fighting in the Crusades. This time period saw the emergence of the genre of tabaqat (biographical dictionaries or biographical compendia).

Ibn Khurdadhbih, an official in the postal service wrote one of the first travel books and the form remained a popular one in Arabic literature with books by ibn Hawqal, ibn Fadlan, al-Istakhri, al-Muqaddasi, al-Idrisi and most famously the travels of ibn Battutah. These give a view of the many cultures of the wider Islamic world and also offer Muslim perspectives on the non-Muslim peoples on the edges of the empire. They also indicated just how great a trading power the Muslim peoples had become. These were often sprawling accounts that included details of both geography and history.

Some writers concentrated solely on history like al-Ya'qubi and al-Tabari, whilst others focused on a small portion of history such as ibn al-Azraq, with a history of Mecca, and ibn Abi Tahir Tayfur, writing a history of Baghdad. The historian regarded as the greatest of all Arabic historians though is ibn Khaldun whose history Muqaddimah focuses on society and is a founding text in sociology and economics.

==== Diaries ====
In the medieval Near East, Arabic diaries were first being written from before the 10th century, though the medieval diary which most resembles the modern diary was that of Abu Ali ibn al-Banna in the 11th century. His diary was the earliest to be arranged in order of date (ta'rikh in Arabic), very much like modern diaries.

==== Literary theory and criticism ====
Literary criticism in Arabic literature often focused on religious texts, and the several long religious traditions of hermeneutics and textual exegesis have had a profound influence on the study of secular texts. This was particularly the case for the literary traditions of Islamic literature.

Literary criticism was also employed in other forms of medieval Arabic poetry and literature from the 9th century, notably by Al-Jahiz in his al-Bayan wa-'l-tabyin and al-Hayawan, and by Abdullah ibn al-Mu'tazz in his Kitab al-Badi.

=== Fiction literature ===
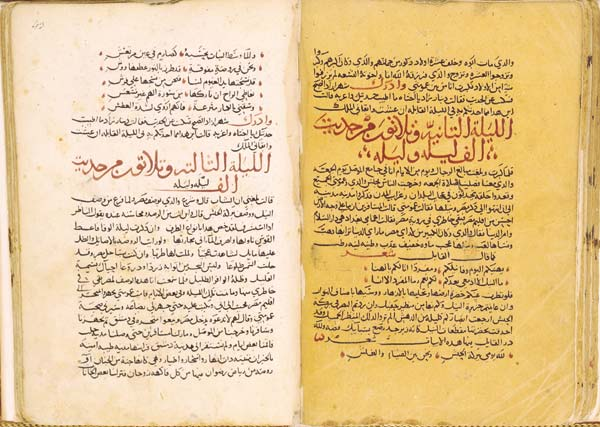
A 14th century Arabic manuscript of One Thousand and One Nights

In the Arab world, there is a fundamental distinction between al-fus'ha (formal language) and al-ammiyyah (colloquial language). Not many writers would write works in this al-ammiyyah or common language, as literature had to be improving, educational and with purpose rather than just entertainment. This did not stop the common role of the hakawati or story-teller who would retell the entertaining parts of more educational works or one of the many Arabic fables or folk-tales, which were often not written down. On the other hand, some of the earliest novels, including the first philosophical novels, were written by Arabic authors.

==== Epic literature ====
The most famous example of Arabic fiction is the One Thousand and One Nights (Arabian Nights). It is easily the best-known work of all Arabic literature, and still affects many of the ideas non-Arabs have about Arabic culture. A good example of the lack of popular Arabic prose fiction is that the stories of Aladdin and Ali Baba, usually regarded as part of the Tales from One Thousand and One Nights, were not actually part of the Tales. They were first included in French translation of the Tales by Antoine Galland who heard them being told by Maronite Hanna Dyab and only existed in incomplete Arabic manuscripts before that. The other great character from Arabic literature, Sinbad, is from the Tales.

The One Thousand and One Nights is usually placed in the genre of Arabic epic literature along with several other works. They are usually collections of short stories or episodes strung together into a long tale. The extant versions were mostly written down relatively late, after the 14th century, although many were undoubtedly collected earlier and many of the original stories are probably pre-Islamic. Types of stories in these collections include animal fables, proverbs, stories of jihad or propagation of the faith, humorous tales, moral tales, tales about the wily con-man Ali Zaybaq, and tales about the prankster Juha.

Ibn ʿAbd Rabbih's anthology Al-ʿIqd al-Farīd (The Unique Necklace), written in medieval Al-Andalus, has been considered one of the seminal texts of Arabic fiction.

==== Maqama ====
Maqama not only straddles the divide between prose and poetry, being instead a form of rhymed prose, it is also part-way between fiction and non-fiction. Over a series of short narratives, which are fictionalised versions of real-life situations, different ideas are contemplated. A good example of this is a maqama on musk, which purports to compare the feature of different perfumes but is in fact a work of political satire comparing several competing rulers. Maqama also makes use of the doctrine of badi or deliberately adding complexity to display the writer's dexterity with language. Al-Hamadhani is regarded as the originator of maqama; his work was taken up by Abu Muhammad al-Qasim al-Hariri, one of al-Hariri's maqama being a study of al-Hamadhani's own work. Maqama was an exceptionally popular form of Arabic literature, one of the few forms which continued to be written during the decline of Arabic in the 17th and 18th centuries.

==== Love literature ====
A famous example of romantic Arabic poetry is Layla and Majnun, dating back to the Umayyad era in the 7th century. It is a tragic story of undying love. Layla and Majnun is considered part of the platonic Love (Arabic: حب عذري) genre, so-called because the couple never marry or consummate their relationship, that is prominent in Arabic literature, though the literary motif is found throughout the world. Other famous Virgin Love stories include Qays and Lubna, Kuthair and Azza, Marwa and al-Majnun al-Faransi and Antara and Abla.

The 10th-century Encyclopedia of the Brethren of Purity features a fictional anecdote of a "prince who strays from his palace during his wedding feast and, drunk, spends the night in a cemetery, confusing a corpse with his bride. The story is used as a gnostic parable of the soul's pre-existence and return from its terrestrial sojourn".

Another medieval Arabic love story was Hadith Bayad wa Riyad (The Story of Bayad and Riyad), a 13th-century Arabic love story. The main characters of the tale are Bayad, a merchant's son and a foreigner from Damascus, and Riyad, a well-educated girl in the court of an unnamed Hajib (vizier or minister) of 'Iraq which is referred to as the lady. The Hadith Bayad wa Riyad manuscript is believed to be the only illustrated manuscript known to have survived from more than eight centuries of Muslim and Arab presence in Spain.

Many of the tales in the One Thousand and One Nights are also love stories or involve romantic love as a central theme. This includes the frame story of Scheherazade herself, and many of the stories she narrates, including "Aladdin", "The Ebony Horse", "The Three Apples", "Tale of Tàj al-Mulúk and the Princess Dunyà: The Lover and the Loved", "Adi bin Zayd and the Princess Hind", "Di'ibil al-Khuza'i With the Lady and Muslim bin al-Walid", "The Three Unfortunate Lovers", and others.

Several elements of courtly love were developed in Arabic literature, namely the notions of "love for love's sake" and "exaltation of the beloved lady" which have been traced back to Arabic literature of the 9th and 10th centuries. The notion of the "ennobling power" of love was developed in the early 11th century by the Persian psychologist and philosopher, Ibn Sina (known as "Avicenna" in Europe), in his Arabic treatise Risala fi'l-Ishq (A Treatise on Love). The final element of courtly love, the concept of "love as desire never to be fulfilled", was also at times implicit in Arabic poetry.

==== Murder mystery ====
The earliest known example of a whodunit murder mystery was "The Three Apples", one of the tales narrated by Scheherazade in the One Thousand and One Nights (Arabian Nights). In this tale, a fisherman discovers a heavy locked chest along the Tigris river and he sells it to the Abbasid Caliph, Harun al-Rashid, who then has the chest broken open only to find inside it the dead body of a young woman who was cut into pieces. Harun orders his vizier, Ja'far ibn Yahya, to solve the crime and find the murderer within three days, or be executed if he fails his assignment. Suspense is generated through multiple plot twists that occur as the story progresses. This may thus be considered an archetype for detective fiction.

==== Satire and comedy ====
In Arabic poetry, the genre of satirical poetry was known as hija. Satire was introduced into prose literature by the author al-Jahiz in the 9th century. While dealing with serious topics in what are now known as anthropology, sociology and psychology, he introduced a satirical approach, "based on the premise that, however serious the subject under review, it could be made more interesting and thus achieve greater effect, if only one leavened the lump of solemnity by the insertion of a few amusing anecdotes or by the throwing out of some witty or paradoxical observations." He was well aware that, in treating of new themes in his prose works, he would have to employ a vocabulary of a nature more familiar in hija, satirical poetry. For example, in one of his zoological works, he satirized the preference for longer human penis size, writing: "If the length of the penis were a sign of honor, then the mule would belong to the (honorable tribe of) Quraysh". Another satirical story based on this preference was an Arabian Nights tale called "Ali with the Large Member".

In the 10th century, the writer Tha'alibi recorded satirical poetry written by the poets As-Salami and Abu Dulaf, with As-Salami praising Abu Dulaf's wide breadth of knowledge and then mocking his ability in all these subjects, and with Abu Dulaf responding back and satirizing As-Salami in return. An example of Arabic political satire included another 10th-century poet Jarir satirizing Farazdaq as "a transgressor of the Sharia" and later Arabic poets in turn using the term "Farazdaq-like" as a form of political satire.

The terms "comedy" and "satire" became synonymous after Aristotle's Poetics was translated into Arabic in the medieval Islamic world, where it was elaborated upon by Arabic writers and Islamic philosophers, such as Abu Bischr, his pupil al-Farabi, Avicenna, and Averroes. Due to cultural differences, they disassociated comedy from Greek dramatic representation and instead identified it with Arabic poetic themes and forms, such as hija (satirical poetry). They viewed comedy as simply the "art of reprehension", and made no reference to light and cheerful events, or troublous beginnings and happy endings, associated with classical Greek comedy. After the Latin translations of the 12th century, the term "comedy" thus gained a new semantic meaning in Medieval literature.

==== Theatre ====
===== Pre-modern theatrical forms =====
Before the 19th century, Arab traditional storytellers and actors created theatrical experiences through their oral performances in colloquial language, mime and role-playing, with the audience participating with their individual imagination of times, places and stories. Examples of such theatrical experiences have been communal dances, ritual reenactments, shadow plays, puppetry, recitations of poetry and improvised performances by travelling troupes. They have traditionally been performed both in villages and towns during religious celebrations such as mawlid in open spaces and in Arabic coffeehouses. The Arab educated classes did not accept these traditional forms of Arabic plays as true literature (adab) and saw them as "frivolous, impudent and debauched entertainment."

In Ashura rituals, known as ta'ziya, laymen re-enact episodes from Muslim history. In particular, Shia Islamic theatrical reenactments revolve around the shahid martyrdom of Ali's sons Hasan ibn Ali and Husayn ibn Ali. Secular plays were known as akhraja and recorded in medieval adab literature, though they were less common than puppetry and ta'ziya dramatic expressions.

There are also several plays composed by Shams al-din Muhammad ibn Daniyal in the 13th century, when he mentioned that older plays are getting stale and offered his new works as fresh material.

===== Modern Arabic theatre =====
Modern Arabic theatrical art was largely inspired by Western theatre that requires a stilent audience seated in a darkened venue and watching a dramatic story, expressed by a predefined plot taking place at a given time and place. The Western form of theatre relies on the imitation of reality and attentive contemplation of the spectators, while the traditional Arabic dramatic forms prompt an unrealistic story, satire and physical involvement of performers and their audience. Basic elements of these dramatic skits shared by the community of spectators and expressed in colloquial Arabic have been defined as "collective history, humour, imagination, ritual, oral tradition, and mythology".

Starting in the 1850s and 1860s, early modern Arabic theatre productions were introduced during the Ottoman era by Marun Al Naqqash in Beirut and Abu Khalil al-Qabbani in Damascus. Al Naqqash translated The Miser into Arabic and published it under the title Al-bakhīl in 1847 as the first known Arabic theatrical text. Al-Qabbani's style of adapting French theatre combined singing, acting and popular improvisation. He is said to have staged about 40 performances, using inspiration from the oral and written literary heritage, such as the One Thousand and One Nights, as well as traditional melodies from Syrian muwashshahat. In January 1895, al-Qabbani worked with Abdu al-Hamuli on theatrical productions presented by the Qabbani troupe at the Cairo Opera House. The event has been regarded as the first occasion on which an Arab singer performed at an opera house.

In Cairo, Yaqub Sanu played an important role in the development of Egyptian theatre in the 1870s, both as a writer of original plays in Standard Arabic and with his adaptations of French plays. The Khedive of Egypt, Ismail Pasha, financially supported Sanu's theatre company and proclaimed him the "Molière of Egypt." Sanu's plays sometimes also were presented in colloquial Egyptian Arabic and often promoted nationalist themes.

==== Philosophical novels ====
The Arab Islamic philosophers, Ibn Tufail (Abubacer) and Ibn al-Nafis, were pioneers of the philosophical novel as they wrote the earliest novels dealing with philosophical fiction. Ibn Tufail wrote the first Arabic novel Hayy ibn Yaqdhan (Philosophus Autodidactus) as a response to Al-Ghazali's The Incoherence of the Philosophers. This was followed by Ibn al-Nafis who wrote a fictional narrative Theologus Autodidactus as a response to Ibn Tufail's Philosophus Autodidactus. Both of these narratives had protagonists (Hayy in Philosophus Autodidactus and Kamil in Theologus Autodidactus) who were autodidactic individuals spontaneously generated in a cave and living in seclusion on a desert island, both being the earliest examples of a desert island story. However, while Hayy lives alone on the desert island for most of the story in Philosophus Autodidactus (until he meets a castaway named Absal), the story of Kamil extends beyond the desert island setting in Theologus Autodidactus (when castaways take him back to civilization with them), developing into the earliest known coming of age plot and eventually becoming the first example of a science fiction novel.

Ibn al-Nafis described his book Theologus Autodidactus as a defense of "the system of Islam and the Muslims' doctrines on the missions of Prophets, the religious laws, the resurrection of the body, and the transitoriness of the world." He presents rational arguments for bodily resurrection and the immortality of the human soul, using both demonstrative reasoning and material from the hadith corpus to prove his case. Later Islamic scholars viewed this work as a response to the metaphysical claim of Avicenna and Ibn Tufail that bodily resurrection cannot be proven through reason, a view that was earlier criticized by al-Ghazali. Ibn al-Nafis' work was later translated into Latin and English as Theologus Autodidactus in the early 20th century.

A Latin translation of Ibn Tufail's work, entitled Philosophus Autodidactus, first appeared in 1671, prepared by Edward Pococke the Younger. The first English translation by Simon Ockley was published in 1708, and German and Dutch translations were also published at the time. These translations later inspired Daniel Defoe to write Robinson Crusoe, which also featured a desert island narrative and was regarded as the first novel in English. Philosophus Autodidactus also inspired Robert Boyle, an acquaintance of Pococke, to write his own philosophical novel set on an island, The Aspiring Naturalist, in the late 17th century. The story also anticipated Rousseau's Émile in some ways, and is also similar to the later story of Mowgli in Rudyard Kipling's The Jungle Book as well the character of Tarzan, in that a baby is abandoned in a deserted tropical island where he is taken care of and fed by a mother wolf. Other European writers influenced by Philosophus Autodidactus include John Locke, Gottfried Leibniz, Melchisédech Thévenot, John Wallis, Christiaan Huygens, George Keith, Robert Barclay, the Quakers, and Samuel Hartlib.

==== Science fiction ====
Al-Risalah al-Kamiliyyah fil Sira al-Nabawiyyah (The Treatise of Kamil on the Prophet's Biography), known in English as Theologus Autodidactus (which is a phonetic transliteration of the Greek name Θεολόγος Αὐτοδίδακτος, meaning self-taught theologian), written by the Arab polymath Ibn al-Nafis (1213–1288), is the earliest known science fiction novel. While also being an early desert island story and coming of age story, the novel deals with various science fiction elements such as spontaneous generation, futurology, apocalyptic themes, the end of the world and doomsday, resurrection and the afterlife. Rather than giving supernatural or mythological explanations for these events, Ibn al-Nafis attempted to explain these plot elements using his own extensive scientific knowledge in anatomy, biology, physiology, astronomy, cosmology and geology. His main purpose behind this science fiction work was to explain Islamic religious teachings in terms of science and philosophy. For example, it was through this novel that Ibn al-Nafis introduces his scientific theory of metabolism, and he makes references to his own scientific discovery of the pulmonary circulation in order to explain bodily resurrection. The novel was later translated into English as Theologus Autodidactus in the early 20th century.

A number of stories within the One Thousand and One Nights (Arabian Nights) also feature science fiction elements. One example is "The Adventures of Bulukiya", where the protagonist Bulukiya's quest for the herb of immortality leads him to explore the seas, journey to the Garden of Eden and to Jahannam, and travel across the cosmos to different worlds much larger than his own world, anticipating elements of galactic science fiction; along the way, he encounters societies of jinns, mermaids, talking serpents, talking trees, and other forms of life. In another Arabian Nights tale, the protagonist Abdullah the Fisherman gains the ability to breathe underwater and discovers an underwater submarine society that is portrayed as an inverted reflection of society on land, in that the underwater society follows a form of primitive communism where concepts like money and clothing do not exist. Other Arabian Nights tales deal with lost ancient technologies, advanced ancient civilizations that went astray, and catastrophes which overwhelmed them. "The City of Brass" features a group of travellers on an archaeological expedition across the Sahara to find an ancient lost city and attempt to recover a brass vessel that Solomon once used to trap a jinn, and, along the way, encounter a mummified queen, petrified inhabitants, lifelike humanoid robots and automata, seductive marionettes dancing without strings, and a brass horseman robot who directs the party towards the ancient city. "The Ebony Horse" features a robot in the form of a flying mechanical horse controlled using keys that could fly into outer space and towards the Sun, while the "Third Qalandar's Tale" also features a robot in the form of an uncanny boatman. "The City of Brass" and "The Ebony Horse" can be considered early examples of proto-science fiction.

Other examples of early Arabic proto-science fiction include al-Farabi's Opinions of the residents of a splendid city about a utopian society, and elements such as the flying carpet.

==== Arabic literature for young readers and children ====
As in other languages, there is a growing number of literary works written in Arabic for young readers. With this group of readers in mind, the Young Readers series of the New York University Press's Library of Arabic Literature (LAL) offers contemporary and even classical texts in its Weaving Words collection, like the tenth-century anthology of stories and anecdotes Al-Faraj Ba'd al-Shiddah (Deliverance Follows Adversity) by medieval writer Al-Muḥassin ibn ʿAlī al-Tanūkhī (327–84/939–94).

In her 2011 essay "Arabic Children's Literature Today: Determining Factors and Tendencies" author and translator from Arabic to German Petra Dünges gave an overview of fiction written for Arab children since its beginnings in Egypt during the late 19th century, focussing on books published between 1990 and 2010. Judging from several modern illustrated books and mangas such as Gold Ring (الذهب سوار) by Emirati writer Qays Sidqiyy (Sheikh Zayed Book Award 2010), she noted an increase in the variety of children's literature in the changing modern Arab society. Further, she noticed a growing demand for stories and adequate illustrations that take children as readers seriously. Finally, she ascertained that Arabic children's literature is an important contribution the development of Arab society, crucial to keeping Arab culture and the Arabic language alive.

Marcia Lynx Qualey, editor-in-chief of ArabLit online magazine, has translated Arabic novels for young readers, such as Thunderbirds by Palestinian writer Sonia Nimr. Further, she has written on Arabic books for teens and participated in academic forums. She and other literary translators and consultants publish the website ArabKidLitNow!, promoting translated Arabic literature for children and young readers.

== Women in Arabic literature ==
In the words of Clarissa Burt,

Despite the historical and social conditions that contributed to an almost total eclipse of women's poetic expression in the literary record as maintained in Arabic culture from the pre-Islamic era through the nineteenth century, with a few significant exceptions, women poets writing in Arabic have made tremendous strides since the dawn of the twentieth century in presenting their poetic offerings in mainstream cultural forums, and contributing to a plethora of new and modern poetic currents in literary cultural throughout the Arab world.

Whilst not playing a major attested part in Arabic literature for much of its history, women have had a continuing role. Women's literature in Arabic has been relatively little researched, and features relatively little in most Arabic-language education systems, meaning that its prominence and importance is probably generally underrated.

=== The Medieval Period ===
In the estimation of Tahera Qutbuddin,

the citation of women's poetry in the general medieval anthologies is sparse. The earliest anthologists either ignored women poets or made disparaging remarks about them ... In his introduction to the Nuzhat al-Julasa, al-Suyuti refers to a large (at least six-volume) anthology--now lost--of 'ancient' women's poetry ... It would seem from this that women poets may have formed a more dynamic part of the poetic landscape, at least in the earliest classical period, than is generally believed.

(The main modern anthology of medieval Arabic women's writing in English translation is that of Abdullah al-Udhari.)

Pre-Islamic women's literature seems to have been limited to the genre of marathiya ('elegy'). The earliest poetesses were al-Khansa and Layla al-Akhyaliyyah of the 7th century. Their concentration on the ritha' or elegy suggests that this was a form deemed acceptable for women to work with. However, the love lyric was also an important genre of women's poetry. The Umayyad and 'Abbasid periods saw professional singing slave girls (qiyan, sing. quayna) who sang love songs and accompanied these with music; alongside panegyric and competitive verse-capping, qiyan also sang love-poetry (ghazal). In his Risalat al-Qiyan (Epistle of the Singing-Girls), al-Jahiz (d. 255/868×69) reckoned that an accomplished singer might have a repertoire of 4,000 songs. Pre-eminent 'Abbasid singing-girls included: 'Inan (paramour of Harun al-Rashid, r. 786–809); Arib al-Ma'muniyya (concubine of Al-Ma'mun, r. 813–17); and Fadl Ashsha'ira (d. 871; concubine of Al-Mutawakkil, r. 847–61). Meanwhile, Harun al-Rashid's half-sister ‘Ulayya bint al-Mahdī (777-825) was also known for her poetic skills, as was the mystic and poet of Basra Rabi'a al-'Adawiyya (d. 801). Women also had an important role in pre-modern periods as patrons of the arts.

Writings from medieval moorish Spain attest to several important female writers, pre-eminently Wallada bint al-Mustakfi (1001–1091), an Umawi princess of al-Andulus, who wrote Sufi poetry and was the lover of fellow poet ibn Zaydun; the Granadan poet Hafsa Bint al-Hajj al-Rukuniyya (d. 1190/91); and Nazhun al-Garnatiya bint al-Qulai’iya (d. 1100). These and other women writers suggest a hidden world of literature by women.

Despite their lack of prominence among the literary elite, women still played an important part as characters in Arabic literature. Sirat al-amirah Dhat al-Himmah, for example, is an Arabic epic with a female warrior, Fatima Dhat al-Himma, as protagonist, and Scheherazade is famous for cunningly telling stories in the One Thousand and One Nights to save her life.

The Mamluk period saw the flourishing of the Sufi master and poet 'A'isha al-Ba'uniyya (d. 1517), who was probably the Arabic-speaking world's most prolific female author before the twentieth century. Living in what is now Egypt and Syria, she came from the al-Ba'uni family, noted for its judges and scholars, and belonged to the 'Urmawi branch of the Qadiriyya order. 'A'isha composed at least twelve books in prose and verse, which included over three hundred long mystical and religious poems.

=== Al-Nahda ===
The earliest prominent female writer of the modern period during which the Arab cultural renaissance (Al-Nahda) took place is Táhirih (1820–52), from what is now Iran. She wrote fine Arabic and Persian poetry.

Women's literary salons and societies in the Arab world were also pioneered during the nineteenth and early twentieth centuries, initially by Christian Arab women, who tended to have more freedom and access to education than their female Muslim contemporaries in the Ottoman Empire. Maryana Marrash (1848−1919) started what is now believed to have been the first literary salon including women in Aleppo. In 1912, May Ziadeh (1886–1941) also started a literary salon in Cairo and in 1922, Mary 'Ajami (1888−1965) did the same in Damascus. These salons supported the emergence of women's literary and journalistic writing and publishing by growing exchange in the male-dominated world of Arabic literature.

=== Late 20th century to early 21st century ===
A quote by Clarissa Burt on modern Arabic poetry by female Arab authors:

Unlocked from the constraints of the traditional ode, several of these and other women have had long careers of poetry writing, entering into areas of expression of women's experience that had not been presented in print before. In many ways, this poetic work has gone hand in hand with the growth of critical discourse about women's role, status, and experience, and women's desires to be fully participating members of public society. [...] With few exceptions, critical reception in the Arab world of these and other women poets has been lukewarm at best, for the most part, often filled with criticism of their adherence or lack thereof to poetic principles that have been held as prescriptive in many schools of Arabic literary criticism.

Alongside Maryana Marrash, May Ziadeh, and Mary 'Ajami, pioneering figures in women's writing in Arabic during this period are Zaynab Fawwaz (modern Lebanon/Egypt, 1846–1914), who arguably wrote the first novel in Arabic and was the first woman to write a play in that language as well; Aisha Taymur (modern Turkey/Egypt, 1840–1902); Malak Hifni Nasif (under the pseudonym Bahithat al-Badiyya, Egypt 1886–1918); Anbara Salam Khalidy (modern Palestine/Lebanon, 1897–1988) Anbara Salam Khalidy (modern Palestine/Lebanon, 1897–1986) and Salma al-Malaika (Iraq, 1908–1953, under the pseudonym Umm Nizar).

Since the Second World War, Arabic women's poetry has become markedly more prominent. Nazik Al-Malaika (Iraq/Egypt, 1923–2007) was the daughter of Salma al-Kadhimiyya, who in her own right was a poet and a vanguard of the early nationalist movement. Al-Malaika, alongside Badr Shakir al-Sayyab, can be considered the initiator of the Free Verse Movement in Arabic poetry. Al-Malaika's poetry is characterised by thematic variations and the use of imagery. She also wrote The Case of Contemporary Poets which is considered a major contribution to Arab literary criticism.

Other major post-war poetic voices include Fadwa Touqan (Palestine, 1917–2003), Rabāb al-Kāẓimī (Iraq, b. 1920), Jalīla Riḍa (Egypt, 1920–2001), Salma Khadra Jayyusi (Palestine, 1926-), Lami'a 'Abbas 'Amara (Iraq, b. 1927). The poetry of Saniya Salih (Syria, 1935–1985) appeared in many well-known magazines of her time, particularly Shi’r and Mawaqif, but remained in the shadow of work by her husband, the poet Muhammad al-Maghout. Her later poems often address her relationship with her two daughters, and many were written during her illness, as she died of cancer. Other Arab modern poetesses include Zubayda Bashīr (Tunisia, b. 1938); Ghada al-Samman (Syria, b. 1942), known not only for poetry, but also for short stories and novels, Su'ad al-Sabah (Kuwait, b.1942), Hamda Khamis (Bahrain, b. 1946), who is regarded as Bahrain's first female free-verse poet and Rasha Omran (Syria, b. 1964).

More recent Arabic literature has seen a growing number of female writers' works published: Suhayr al-Qalamawi, Ulfat Idlibi, Layla Ba'albakki, Zuhrabi Mattummal, Hoda Barakat, Alifa Rifaat, Salwa Bakr and Samiha Khrais are some of these novelists and prose writers. There has also been a number of significant female authors who wrote non-fiction, often exploring the female condition in Muslim societies, including Zaynab al-Ghazali, Nawal el-Saadawi and Fatema Mernissi.

Women writers in the Arab world have unavoidably courted controversy. Layla Ba'albakki, for instance, was charged with obscenity and "endangering public morality" a few months after she published her collection of short stories titled Tenderness to the Moon (1963). The Lebanese vice squad actually traveled to every bookstore, where the book was sold, to confiscate all remaining copies because of its erotic content.

In Algeria, women's oral literature used in ceremonies called Būqālah, also meaning ceramic pitcher, became a symbol of national identity and anti-colonialism during the War of Independence in the 1950s and early 60s. These poems are usually four to ten lines in Algerian Arabic, and cover topics ranging from everyday life, like love and work, to the political, like the struggle for independence. Since using Algerian Arabic as poetic language was considered an act of cultural resistance in itself at the time, these poems took on a revolutionary implication.

=== Contemporary Arabic literature by women writers ===
Suffice to say although female Arab authors still risk controversy by discussing explicit themes or taboo topic in their works, it is a theme explored more explicitly and with more vigour due to greater outreach thanks to social media and more international awareness of Arab literature. More current Arab female writers include Hanan al-Shaykh, Salwa al-Neimi (writer, poet and journalist), Joumanna Haddad (journalist and poet), Assia Djebar. Ahdaf Soueif and Yasmine El-Rashidi amongst others who confront less-talked about topics such as sex, prostitution, homosexuality and political censorship and prosecution within the Arab diaspora and also internationally in relation to Arab emigration.

Contemporary female Arab writers/poets/journalists alongside producing literature and non-fiction works often take on an activist role in their careers in order to highlight and improve the female condition in Arab society. This concept is embodied in female figures such as Mona Eltahawy, who is an Egyptian columnist and international public speaker. She is best known for her unconventional comments on Arab and Muslim issues and her involvement in global feminism. In 2015, she released her book Headscarves and Hymens in which she argues the need for a sexual revolution in the Middle East. Another writer from Egypt is Basma Abdel Aziz, who has published dystopian novels called The Queue or Here is a Body, as well as nonfiction based on her studies of oppression, torture and authoritarian language of the government in Egypt.

Contemporary Arab women's literature has been strongly influenced by the diaspora of Arabic speakers, who have produced writing not only in Arabic, but also in other languages, prominently English, French, Dutch and German. The Internet is also important in furthering the reach of literature produced in Arabic or Arabic-speaking regions:

It is among the younger generation of poets that the Internet has become a platform for mounting collections and sharing poetry. Some of these poets have their own websites, while others are included on ever growing web anthologies being posted by young Arab computer geeks dedicated to the construction of web archives for Arabic poetry and poetic history. Similarly, critical treatment of these women's poetry, while now well established in on-line resources and web-based sites for major paper publications throughout the Arab world, has yet to produce clearly defined critical means of articulating emerging values for poetry, for measuring the critical worth of some of these new productions, and for encouraging the production of Arab women's poetry which will have weight, depth, and acclaim comparable to the work of some of the major Arab male poets of our day.

== Literary criticism ==
For multiple centuries, there has been a vibrant culture of literary criticism in the Arabic speaking world. The poetry festivals of the pre-Islamic period often pitched two poets against each other in a war of verse, in which one would be decided to be winner by the audience. Literary criticism also relates to theology, and gained official status with Islamic studíes of the Qur'an. Although nothing which might be termed 'literary criticism' in the modern sense, was applied to a work held to be i'jaz or inimitable and divinely inspired, textual analysis, called ijtihad and referring to independent reasoning, was permitted. This study allowed for a better understanding of the message and facilitated interpretation for practical use, all of which helped the development of a critical method important for later work on other literature. A clear distinction regularly drawn between works in literary language and popular works has meant that only part of the literature in Arabic was usually considered worthy of study and criticism.

Some of the first Arabic poetry analysis are Qawa'id al-shi'r or The Foundations of Poetry by Kufan grammarian Tha'lab (d. 904) and Naqd al-shi'r or Poetic Criticism by Qudamah ibn Ja'far. Other works continued the tradition of contrasting two poets in order to determine which one best follows the rule of classical poetic structure. Plagiarism also became a significant topic, exercising the critics' concerns. The works of al-Mutanabbi were particularly studied with this concern. He was considered by many the greatest of all Arab poets, but his own arrogant self-regard for his abilities did not endear him to other writers and they looked for a source for his verse. Just as there were collections of facts written about many different subjects, numerous collections detailing every possible rhetorical figure used in literature emerged, as well as how to write guides.

Modern criticism first compared new works unfavourably with the classical ideals of the past, but these standards were soon rejected as too artificial. The adoption of the forms of European romantic poetry dictated the introduction of corresponding critical standards. Taha Hussayn, himself well versed in European thought, would even dare to examine the Qur'an with modern critical analysis, in which he pointed out ideas and stories borrowed from pre-Islamic poetry.

An outstanding Sudanese scholar and literary critic with a long list of publications on poetry or other genres, and on Arabic language in general, was Abdallah al-Tayyib (1921–2003). Arguably his most notable work is A Guide to Understanding Arabic Poetry, written over thirty-five years and published in four volumes of several thousand pages.

== Outside views of Arabic literature ==
In al-Andalus, Arabic literary culture had a important impact on Jewish literary culture in the tenth to thirteenth centuries; this included the assimilation of features, genres, and stylistic devices of classical Arabic poetry as well as the decision to write poetry in Hebrew and in a register from Biblical Hebrew.

Literature in Arabic has been influential outside the Islamic world. One of the first important translations of Arabic literature was Robert of Ketton's translation of the Qur'an in the twelfth century, but it would not be until the early eighteenth century that much of the diverse Arabic literature would be recognised in the West. This was mostly due to Arabists, like Forster Fitzgerald Arbuthnot and his books such as Arabic Authors: A Manual of Arabian History and Literature. The 1996 Panizzi Lectures were on the "Introduction of Arabic Learning into England."

Antoine Galland's French translation of the Thousand and One Nights was the first major work in Arabic which found great success outside the Muslim world. Other significant translators were Friedrich Rückert and Richard Burton, along with others working at Fort William, India. Since at least the 19th century, Arabic and many works in other Western Asian languages fuelled a fascination in Orientalist thinking and artistic production in the West. Works of dubious 'foreign' morals were particularly popular, but even these were censored for content, such as homosexual references, which were not permitted in Victorian society. Most of the works chosen for translation helped reinforced the stereotypes of the audiences. Compared to the variety and scope of literature written in Arabic, relatively few historical or modern Arabic works have been translated into other languages.

Since the mid-20th century, there has been an increase of translations of Arabic books into other languages, and Arabic authors are beginning to receive wider of acclaim. Egyptian writer Naguib Mahfouz had most of his works translated after he won the 1988 Nobel Prize for Literature. Other writers, including Abdul Rahman Munif and Tayeb Salih have found critical acclaim by Western scholars, and both Alaa Al Aswany's The Yacoubian Building and Rajaa al-Sanea's Girls of Riyadh attracted significant Western media attention in the first decade of the 21st century.

== See also ==
- Modern Arabic literature
- Egyptian literature
- Syrian literature
- Palestinian literature
- Moroccan literature
- Copto-Arabic literature
- Arabic short story
- Riddles (Arabic)
- Arabian mythology
- Literary Arabic
- Islamic Golden Age
- List of countries and territories where Arabic is an official language
