= Samiha Khrais =

Jordanian writer and novelist

- Born: 16 August 1956 (age 70); Amman, Jordan
- Education: Bachelor's degree in Sociology
- Alma mater: Cairo University
- Occupations: Writer, journalist, translator, editor-in-chief, screenwriter
- Writing career
- Language: Arabic, English
- Genres: Novel, short story, literary articles, film and radio screenplays, literary translations
- Notable works: The Tree Stump, Slaves' Peanuts
- Notable awards: The Order of Al Hussein for Distinguished Contributions (2015); Katara Prize for Arabic Novel (2017)

Samiha Khrais, alternative spelling Samihah Kharis (Arabic: سميحة خريس, born 16 August 1956) is a Jordanian novelist, journalist and translator. She was born in Amman and completed her primary and secondary school education in Qatar and Sudan and her university education in Egypt. For around 20 years, Khrais held a number of positions in the field of journalism, including editor-in-chief for Jordanian Hatem magazine and writer for Al-Ittihad newspaper, among others. She served as board member of the Radio and Television Department and PEN International in Jordan, and one of the founders of Emirates Writers Union. She has published over 15 literary works, and was nominated for a number of literary prizes, most notably, the Katara Prize for Arabic Novel in 2017.

== Education ==
Khrais completed her primary education and part of her secondary education in Qatar. Due to the nature of her father's diplomatic post, Khrais resumed her secondary education in Sudan, and graduated in 1973 from the literary branch of the secondary school for girls in Khartoum. In 1978, she obtained her bachelor's degree in Sociology from Cairo University in Egypt. She writes in her native Arabic and in English.

== Career ==
Khrais first started working in the field of journalism and wrote for some of the well-known Arabic newspapers, including Al-Ittihad, an Emirati newspaper from 1981 to 1998, for Al-Dustour daily Egyptian newspaper in 1998, and Al Ra'i Jordanian newspaper. A year later, she was appointed director of the Cultural Department of Al Ra'i newspaper and editor-in-chief of Hatem, a children's magazine issued by the same newspaper. In 2009, she served as board member of the Radio and Television Department of the Jordan News Agency Petra. In addition, she was a member of cultural associations, including the Jordanian Writers Association, Jordan Press Association and PEN International. Khrais is also one of the founding members of the Emirates Writers Union.

Khrais has published more than 15 novels and several short stories, written television and radio scripts and translated a selection of Jordanian short stories into English. Her literary works gained wide recognition; some of them were translated into other languages, such as The Notebook of Floods into German and Spanish, and The Plate into German. Other literary contributions were featured in Jordanian and other Arabic newspapers. In the years 2002 and 2003, her novels, The Tree of Leopards, Poppy and The Notebook of Floods, were broadcast by Jordan Radio and Television Corporation as a radio show. Another novel titled Crimea was aired as a television show under the name The Night and the Dessert. Khrais was awarded at the Cairo Festival for Radio and Television for several years for several of her novels, including The Tree of Leopards, Poppy and Crimea. In 2002, literary magazine Banipal featured contemporary Jordanian writers, including the translation of two chapters from Khrais's novel The Poppy.

== Works ==
=== Novels ===
- My Journey (original title: Rehlaty), Dar Al-Haitham, Beirut, 1980.
- The Tide (original title: Al-Madd), Dar Al-Shorouk, Amman, 1990.
- The Tree of Leopards: The Sharing of Life (original title: Shajarat Al-Fuhood: Taqaseem Al-Hayaah), Dar Al-Karmel For Publishing & Distribution, Amman, 1995.
- The Tree of Leopards: The Sharing of Passion (original title: Shajarat Al-Fuhood: Taqaseem Al-‘Eshq), Sharqiyat Publishing House, Cairo, 1997.
- Crimea (original title: Al-Qurumiyah), Greater Amman Municipality publications, Amman, 1998.
- Poppy (original title: Khashkash), The Centre for Arab Unity, Beirut, 2000.
- The Notebook of Floods (original title: Dafaatir Al-Tawafaan), Greater Amman Municipality publications, Amman, 2003 (first edition), and Al-Dar Al-Masriah Al-Lubnaniah, Cairo 2004 (second edition).
- The Plate (original title: Al-Sahn), Dar Azminah For Publishing & Distribution, Amman, 2003.
- Nara: The Paper Empire (original title: Imbraturiy-it Waraq), Dar Nara for Publishing & Distribution Amman, 2007
- Dancing with the Devil (original title: Al-Raqs Ma’ Al-Shaytaan), Dar Nara for Publishing & Distribution, Amman, 2008.
- Us (original title: Nahn-u), Dar Nara for Publishing & Distribution, Amman, 2009.
- Yahya (original title: Yahya), Dar Thaqafaat, Beirut, 2010, and Arab Scientific Publishers House, Beirut, 2010.
- On a Bird’s Wing (original title: ‘Ala Ginaah Al-Tayr), Dar Al-Hiwar, Latakia, 2011.
- Slaves’ Peanuts, (original title: Fustuq ʻabīd) 2016.
- The Tree Stump: An Arabic Historical Novel. East Lansing. Michigan State University Press. 2019.

=== Short story collections ===
- With the Land (original title: Ma’ Al-Ard), Dar Al-Ayyam, Khartoum, 1978.
- Orchestra (original title: Orkestra), Dar Al-Kindi, Irbid, 1996.
- Contribution to short story collection Stories from Jordan (original title: Qisas min Al-Urdun), Jordanian Writers Association.

== Critical reception ==
Arab literary critics have praised Khrais's novels for their psychological rendering of Arab women's lives. The Algerian critic Rachid Ben Malek called her novels "a leap in Modern Arabic literature", referring to her choice of semantic elements and methodological approaches in composing her writings. An essay in the International Journal of Postcolonial Studies about the novel Slaves' Peanuts, dealing with the slave trade in Sudan, stated:

The Arabic novel displays with great realism repeated cycles of oppression against African people to emphasize the global impact of colonial rule and the need for former colonial countries to take responsibility and heal the wounds of the past.

— Halla A. Shureteh, Raja K. Al-Khalili & Shadi S. Neimneh, University of Jordan

In an article about Arab Women's writings in ArabLit magazine, Syrian writer Shahla Ujayli said that Khrais's novel Babnous "demonstrates her power of artistic narrative and courage in representing narrative cultures of marginalized ethnic groups in Sudan."

US-based World Literature Today magazine attributed to her novel The Tree Stump and its literary rendering of the 1916 Arab Revolt against the Turkish Empire "[...] the wish to provide an alternative account to [T.E.] Lawrence’s, one rooted in the experiences of Arabs", based on information obtained during Khrais’s meetings with tribal elders that “challenged the narrative that Lawrence and most Western historians provided.”

In his M.A. thesis at DePaul University, Chicago, Zachary Oesterreicher called Khrais's writing a form of "resistance against oppression and of advancement of social justice of Arabs, and Arab women in particular, via the act of storytelling."

== Awards ==
- The State Incentive Award in recognition of The Tree of Leopards" novel, Jordan Ministry of Culture, Amman, 1997.
- Gold medal for Khrais's integral work, Cairo International Festival for Contemporary & Experimental Theatre, Cairo, 2002.
- Aboul-Qacem Echebbi Award in recognition to The Notebook of Floods novel, Tunisia, 2004.
- Arab Creativity Award for Khrais's work, Arab Thought Foundation, Beirut, 2008.
- State Appreciation and Encouragement Award in the field of literature (collaborative work), Jordan, 2014.
- The Order of Al Hussein for Distinguished Contributions, Jordan, 2015.
- Katara Prize for Arabic Novel in recognition of Slaves' Peanuts (original title: Fustuq Abid), in the category of novels published in 2017.

== See also ==
- Modern Arabic literature
- Arabic short story
- Contemporary Arabic literature by women writers
