= Arabic short story =

Prose literature in Arabic language

With the spread of the printing press in Egypt and the Levant by the early 19th century, Egyptian, Lebanese and Syrian newspapers and magazines increased the publication of Arabic short stories and sections of original or translated novels, influenced by the Western world. During that time, Arab writers referred to this type of creative writing as Riwaya (novel), Qissah (story), or Hikayah (tale) to denote more specific types of what is known today as modern Arabic novels and short stories.

== History and development ==
Egyptian authors such as Muhammad Husayn Haykal, Mahmoud Taymour, Tawfiq al-Hakim, Yusuf Idris and others influenced the first modern Arabic short stories written by Syrian and Lebanese authors. Since then, authors such as Zakaria Tamer, Faris Farzur, Ghada al-Samman, and many others are considered to be some of the distinguished authors who contributed to the development of this subgenre of Arabic prose writing.

The Arabic short story has been classified in three different periods. The first is “The Embryonic Stage,” (Arabic المرحلة الجنينيّة), dated from the beginning of the 19th century to 1914. The works of writers of this stage such as Salim Al-Bustani, Labibah Hashim, Khalil Gibran, Mustafa Lutfi al-Manfaluti and others were described as romantic, and they had adapted Western short story techniques. The second stage, known as “The Trial Stage,” (Arabic المرحلة التجريبيّة), dated from 1914 to 1925, may be called the traditional stage, in which we find^{[who]} clear attempts for authentic voices. Writers of this new stage, such as Muhammad Taymour, Tahir Lashin and others, felt it necessary of studying its techniques in Western literature and approach it in an innovative way. And finally, “The Formative Stage,” (Arabic المرحلة التشكيليّة) which extends from 1925 to the present, was started by Mahmoud Taymour, where a new narrative style emerged emphasizing the development and psychological analysis of the characters in the stories with a more realistic approach.

In the 1960s, the Arabic short story achieved a distinguished level in specific artistic characteristics, including an insistence on its length, encompassing a short narrative time frame, having critical and psychological details, written in prose language, with a minimal number of characters, and conveying an ambiguous ending, which leaves the reader to his own imagination and interpretation.

== See also ==
- Arabic literature
- Egyptian literature
- Syrian literature
- Lebanese literature

== Literature ==
- Akif, M. "Political Criticism in the Short Stories of Yusuf Idris: "Innocence" and "19502"." Massachusetts Review. 42:4 :672-688, 2001.
- Mohja Kahf: The Silences of Contemporary Syrian Literature. World Literature Today. 2001;75(2), pp. 224–236. doi:10.2307/40156522
- Samādī, Imtinān. Zakarīyā Tāmir wa-al-qissah al-qasīrah. [Zakaria Tamer and the Short Story]. ‘Ammān: al-Mu’assasah al-‘Arabīyah, 1995.
- Julie Scott Meisami, Paul Starkey (eds.): Encyclopedia of Arabic Literature. Routledge, London 1998, ISBN 0-415-06808-8
- Mostafa Sokkar, "Maayoof al makhtoof" published in iraqstory.net. Jan, 2003.
- Paul Starkey (2006). Modern Arabic Literature. Edinburgh University Press, Edinburgh, ISBN 0-7486-1290-4.
