= Coffeehouses in Arabic culture =

History and impact of Arabic coffeehouses

Coffeehouses of the Arab World
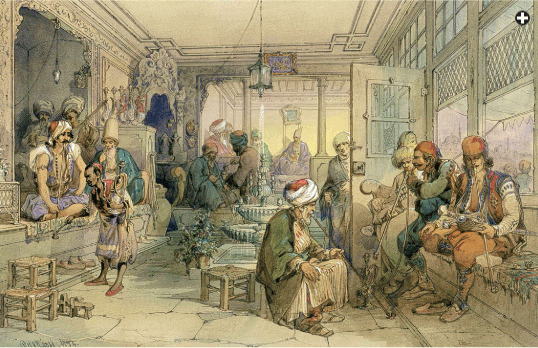
- An 1854 watercolor depicting a coffeehouse in Istanbul, showing men from different social backgrounds sitting informally, drinking coffee and engaging in conversations.

Origins
- Country: Arabian Peninsula / Yemen
- Origin date: 15th century
- Region: Middle East, North Africa, Ottoman Empire
- First known coffeehouse: Al-Makha (Mokha), Yemen
- Peak popularity: 16th-18th centuries
- Key cities: Cairo, Damascus, Istanbul, Baghdad

Characteristics
- Type: Social and cultural gathering place
- Characteristics: Arabic coffee, shisha, poetry, music, political discussions
- Associated groups: Sufis, poets, merchants, intellectuals

Documentation and legacy
- Cultural significance: Birthplace of coffee culture and urban social life
- Influence: European coffeehouse, modern café culture
- Recognition: Considered for UNESCO Intangible Heritage status
- Notable scholars: Ralph S.Hattox, Allan Gallay
- Iconography: Miniatures, early photographs

In Arabic culture, coffeehouses (Arabic: مقاهي, romanized: Maqāhī) have historically functioned as spaces for social interaction, cultural expression, and intellectual exchange throughout the Arab world. Emerging alongside the spread of coffee from Yemen in the 15th century, these establishments became key elements of urban life, shaping the social and cultural fabric of Middle Eastern and North African societies. More than places for drinking coffee, they evolved into public arenas where people gathered to share news, hold conversations, listen to music and discuss ideas. Over time, coffeehouses embraced the traditions and aesthetics of the cities they inhabited, whether in Mecca, Cairo, Damascus, or Marrakesh, while continuing to serve as enduring centers of social life.

== Origins of Arabic coffeehouses ==
Early forms of the beverage now known as coffee were consumed in Yemen, where Sufi orders used qahwa to maintain wakefulness during nighttime dhikr recitations. This early coffee-based beverage was named after the port city of Mokha, from which coffee beans were first exported to the other parts of the Arab World. Yemen was once one of the world’s major producers and exporters, with “Mocha” coffee. Yemeni traders played a crucial role in spreading both the beverage and its associated rituals, contributing to its growing popularity across the Islamic world.

In the 15th century, coffee cultivation and consumption began in Yemen, where merchants transformed it into a lucrative and commercial product. The beans, often sourced from the Ethiopian highlands, were roasted, ground, and brewed in a method that closely resembles modern coffee preparation. By the early 16th century, coffee spread northward to Mecca, Cairo, and Damascus, where coffeehouses — known as maqāhī (مقاهي) became popular meeting places.

By the mid-16th century, coffeehouses had become central to the social and cultural life of Ottoman urban centers, particularly in Istanbul. In these establishments, visitors gathered to drink coffee, exchange news, recite poetry, listen to music, or play games such as chess. Coffeehouses thus evolved into intellectual and social hubs, often referred to as "schools of the wise" (madrasa al-‘uqalā’), and played a key role in shaping public discourse and cultural exchange across the Arab and Ottoman worlds.

In Cairo, coffeehouses flourished despite occasional bans issued by conservative scholars and religious authorities, who feared that these gatherings could encourage political dissent or distract from religious observance. Nevertheless, coffee gradually gained widespread acceptance and became an integral element of everyday life in Arab and Islamic societies.

From Yemen, coffee rapidly spread across the Ottoman Empire, Safavid Iran, and the Mughal Empire. Within these realms, it was celebrated both in bustling public coffeehouses and at royal courts.In the Safavid court, a dedicated coffee kitchen operated under the supervision of a qahwahchī-bāshī (chief coffee master), while in Mughal palaces, a thick, sweet, Arab-style coffee was served during banquets and ceremonies.

Gradually, coffee came to symbolize refinement, hospitality, and intellectual engagement throughout the Islamic world. Its diffusion not only transformed social customs but also laid the groundwork for the emergence of a global coffee culture, influencing trade, urban life, and intercultural exchange from the Middle East to Europe.

== Architecture and atmosphere ==
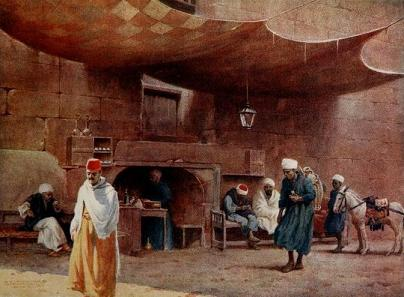
An Arabian coffeehouse in Cairo, Egypt, c. 1920s.

Early coffeehouses were small, street-front halls opening onto streets or bazaars. They were designed for accessibility and visibility, allowing passersby to observe the lively atmosphere inside. Later, they developed into more complex structures with multiple spaces. The main hall, known as "meydan", was an open square surrounded by raised platforms called "divan" that provided seating for customers. In larger coffeehouses, divans were subdivided into alcoves where small groups could meet in greater privacy. Meydans were often used as stages and served as centres of urban sociality, hosting storytellers, musicians, and poets who entertained audiences. Many coffeehouses also included small gardens or open courtyards decorated with fountains, providing a peaceful retreat from the busy streets. Some even offered light refreshments, making them important spaces for leisure and cultural exchange.

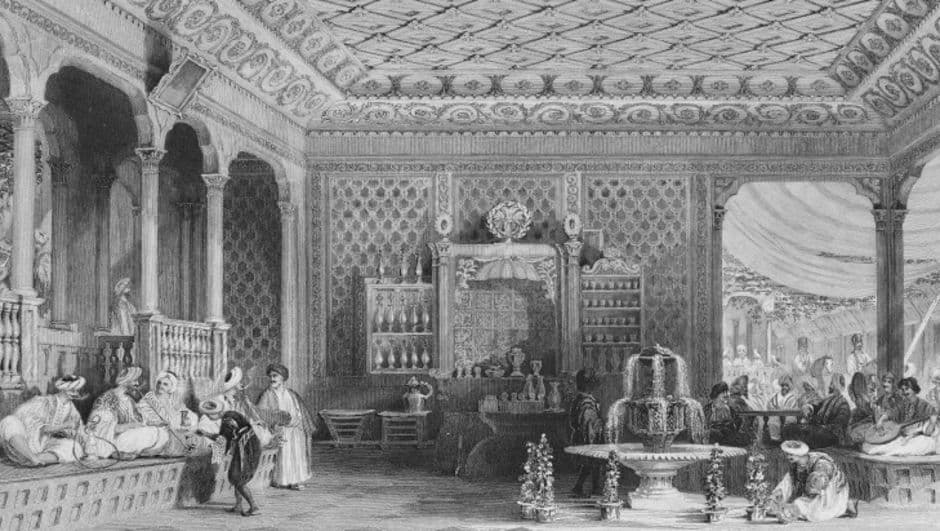
Interior of a coffeehouse in Istanbul, Turkey (18th century)

Interior spaces were decorated with carpets, hanging lamps, and brass trays that created a comfortable environment for customers. According to Farshid Emami, an historian in Islamic art and architecture, the smell of roasted coffee and tobacco smoked from hookahs contributed to a rich "multi-sensory" experience that defines these establishments.

Acoustics were an important aspect for coffeehouses. Domed ceilings and wooden beams were used to amplify music and voices, allowing public speakers to be heard clearly by everyone. Because of their physical layout, coffeehouses became places where debates, public readings, and musical performances took place. The meydans, used as stages, were vital nodes of urban public life. Over time, these spaces helped shape the early traditions of storytelling, poetry recitals, and political discourse that flourished within the Arab world.

== Economic impact ==
Coffee has long played a major role in the economies of Arab countries, both as a traditional crop and as part of modern café culture. In countries such as Saudi Arabia, Yemen, Lebanon, and Ethiopia's neighbouring Arab regions, coffee production and trade support thousands of farmers and small businesses. In Yemen, for example, coffee cultivation—particularly the renowned Arabica variety known as "Mocha"—has been a source of livelihood for centuries and continues to represent an important export commodity. In Yemen, coffee plantations cover around 34,981 hectares (2.4 percent of all cultivable land), and led to the exportation of around $20.2 million of coffee beans in 2020. The coffeehouse culture that developed around Yemeni coffee throughout the Arab world was sustained in part by its economic significance. Despite challenges such as political instability and water scarcity, coffee remains one of Yemen's most important export commodities and a symbol of its cultural heritage.

In recent years, the growth of specialty coffee industries and independent cafés throughout the Arab world has also contributed to urban economic growth, tourism, and youth employment. In major cities such as Riyadh, Dubai, Doha, Amman, and Beirut, new generation coffee shops blend local traditions with global trends, attracting entrepreneurs and consumers seeking modern and creative spaces. Coffee festivals, barista competitions, and training programs now attract both local and international visitors, bolstering the region's growing reputation in the global coffee economy.

Recent research in Saudi Arabia indicates that the specialty coffee sector is becoming a significant driver of economic, social, and environmental performance in the Kingdom. The study observes that the coffee industry has emerged as a robust trend in the Gulf region, establishing Saudi Arabia as one of the pioneers in developing specialty coffee in the GCC.

== Women and coffeehouses ==
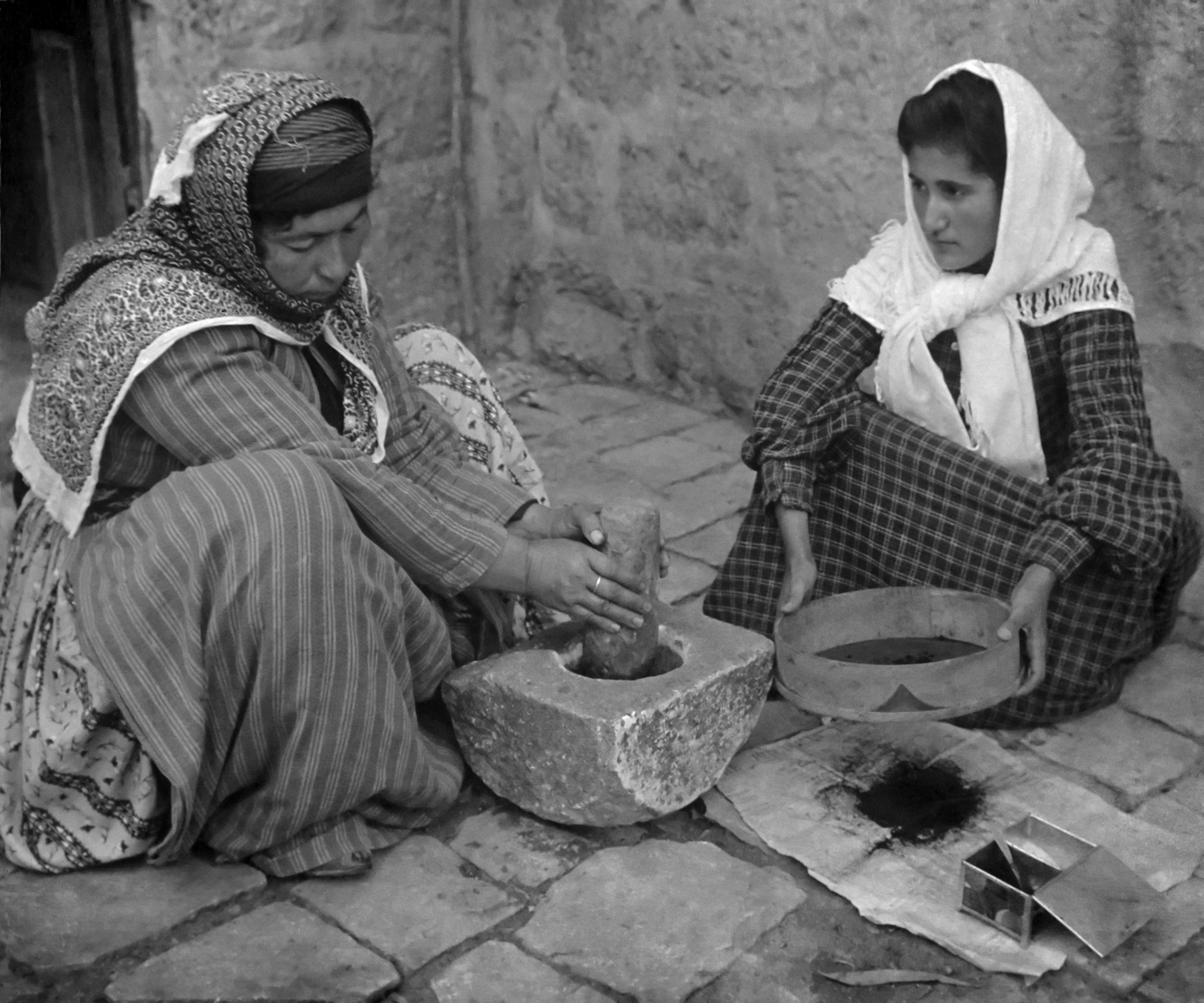
Palestinian women grinding coffee beans

Women have increasingly become a notable presence in Arabic coffeehouses, spaces that were traditionally dominated by men. In recent years, many coffeehouses have evolved into more inclusive environments, reflecting broader societal changes regarding women's rights and their participation in public life across the Arab world.

The industry has created jobs for women, both as employees and entrepreneurs, with cafés like Sisters’ Brew in Jeddah receiving attention as women-led businesses. Modern establishments now actively encourage female patronage, creating welcoming spaces for women to socialize, pursue education, and engage in cultural activities. Some coffeehouses have gone further by hosting events specifically aimed at women, such as book clubs, art exhibitions, and discussion panels, fostering a sense of community and belonging. Additionally, the rise of women-owned coffeehouses has contributed to greater visibility and empowerment for women in public spaces. Social media has also played a significant role in promoting these inclusive venues and normalizing women's presence in coffeehouse culture.

Despite these advancements, women still face challenges in certain regions, where cultural norms may restrict their access to coffeehouses. In conservative areas, women may encounter stigma or disapproval when visiting these spaces, which can discourage their participation and highlight the ongoing need for advocacy and awareness.

As coffeehouses become more inclusive, they play a vital role in shaping cultural dialogues, supporting female entrepreneurship, and promoting gender equality in the region.

== Social and cultural role of coffeehouses ==
In Arabia, coffee serves not just as a drink but as a symbol of tradition, community, and aspiration. Initially, coffee was consumed in coffeehouses. Although they were originally intended as spots to enjoy coffee, they gradually evolved into gathering places where people connect and discuss their concerns. Coffee hospitality is considered a moral duty by more than 94% of Saudi families, while nearly three-quarters of young people visit coffeehouses (maqha) every week, fostering connections across generations. Some authors claim that coffeehouses served as a birthplace for literary styles like satire and social criticism. Today, however, the rebellious spirit present in early establishments is less apparent in contemporary coffee chains, which tend to emphasize convenience and modern aesthetics.

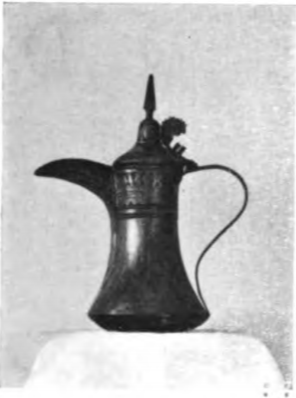
- Dallah, a traditional pot for brewing and serving Arabic coffee

Coffeehouses were the primary place for people to congregate in the Ottoman Empire's major cities by the middle of the fifteenth century, and this practice quickly extended to Safavid Iran as well. These vibrant places soon became the centre of city life, attracting people to mingle, converse, and unwind—despite occasional attempts by the authorities to close them down out of concern that these meetings would inspire people to rebel against their authority.

In Arab culture, coffee has long been associated with important values like hospitality, generosity, and honor. Coffeehouses embodied these ideals. Offering coffee in these venues was a gesture of politeness and respect. Community leaders frequently used coffeehouses to bring people together, thus strengthening their function as centers of social unity. Gradually, coffeehouses became integral to public life, preserving ceremonial methods of making and serving coffee-often using the dallah and small finjan cups-that highlighted a shared sense of identity and togetherness.

At the time, the beverage was considered neither fully “ḥalāl” nor fully “ḥarām” across various cities and regions, including Egypt, Damascus, Mecca, and Medina. It became widely accepted only when Arabs from rural and desert areas adopted it and declared it permissible. Unlike the nightly practices of Sufis, who sought to drink coffee to aid spiritual devotion and concentration, strong coffee brewed at dawn and enjoyed before or after breakfast helped people remain energetic and alert throughout the day.

=== Coffeehouses in Mecca ===
In Mecca, coffeehouses emerged as centers of social and cultural life. These places accommodated a variety of activities, such as gatherings devoted to literature, poetry readings, and live music. Coffee was often celebrated in written works and shared among patrons in a communal setting. To enhance the atmosphere, owners used to burn incense and place fragrant plants throughout the establishments.

They became popular haunts for poets, singers, Qurʾān reciters, and storytellers, with some offering performances of song and dance. Pilgrims and guests regularly found comfort in these welcoming spaces, which offered opportunities for reflection and entertainment. Storytelling was common in this environment, often led by Yemeni performers who narrated folk stories, religious tales, and songs honoring the Prophet. Besides entertainment, coffeehouses also doubled as informal information hubs for travelers, providing practical advice about routes, destinations, and local customs. Through this blend of cultural exchange, education, and entertainment, Mecca's coffeehouses became dynamic institutions, reflecting the religious and social landscape of the Hijaz region. They also played a role in shaping the early coffee culture that later spread to the Ottoman Empire and beyond, influencing the development of similar venues in cities such as Cairo, Istanbul, and Damascus. These establishments thus not only mirrored Mecca's vibrant community life but also contributed to the broader diffusion of Arab intellectual and social traditions through the Islamic world.

=== Coffeehouse Culture in the Maghreb and Morocco ===
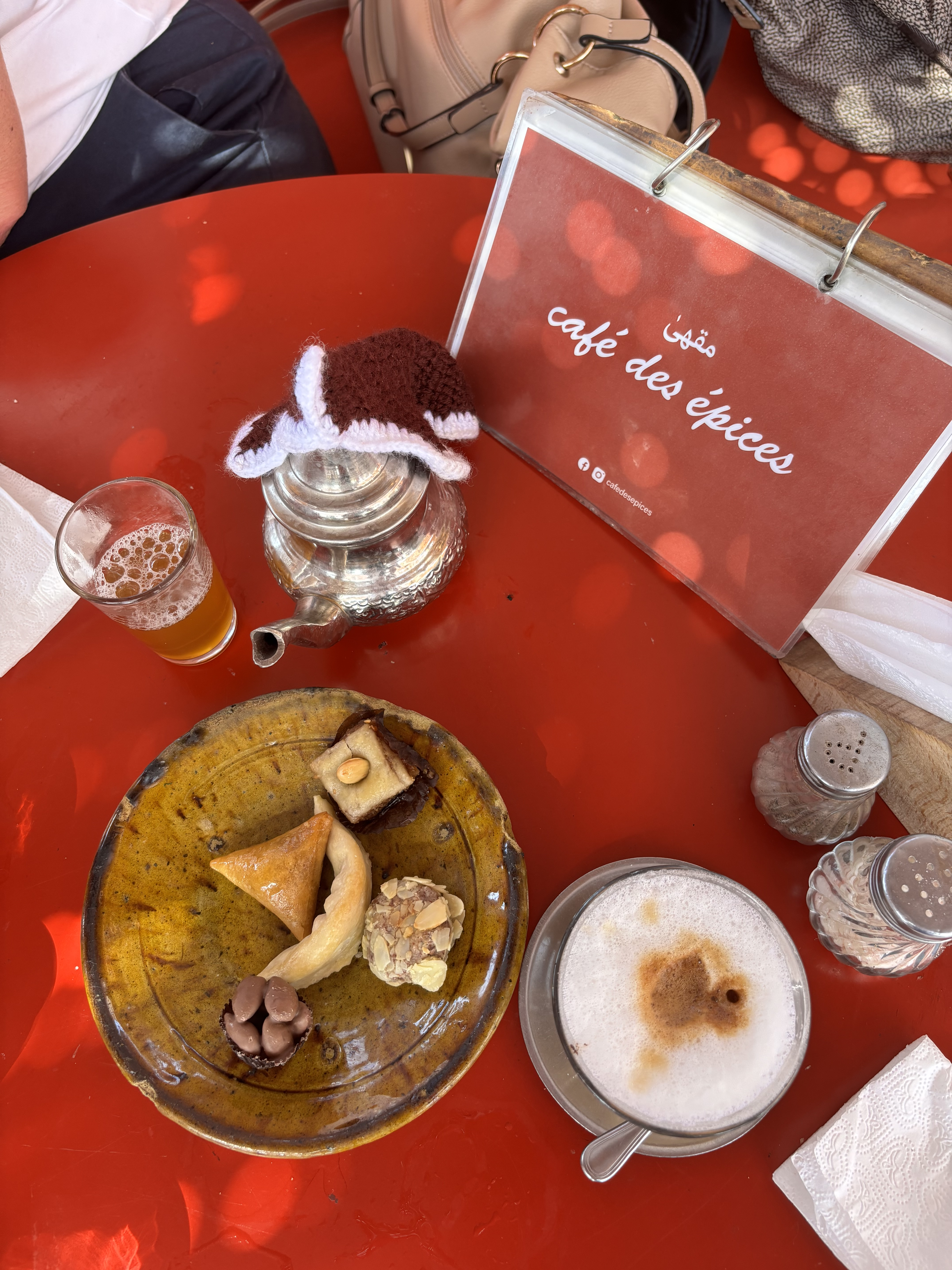
Moroccan specialties: mint tea, noss noss coffee, and traditional pastries

In the Maghreb, especially in Morocco, the culture of coffeehouses developed its own distinct identity, shaped by local customs and patterns of urban life. Moroccan maqāhī became a central meeting point for social exchange, music, and the sharing of ideas, much like their counterparts in Cairo or Damascus.

Traditional Moroccan coffeehouses are characterized by open-air terraces overlooking busy streets or squares, where men gather to drink qahwa ʿarabiyya (Arabic coffee) or mint tea, and discuss politics, sports, and community affairs. In many cases, these cafés also serve as informal storytelling centers and spaces of cultural continuity, reflecting Morocco's mix of Arab, Amazigh, and Andalusian influences.

Today, Moroccan coffeehouses remain essential to daily social life, bridging traditional and modern cultural expressions. Many have introduced art displays, music performances, or more inclusive environments that welcome both men and women. They continue the legacy of the early Arab maqāhī as spaces for connection, reflection, and public conversation.

== Political and intellectual significance ==
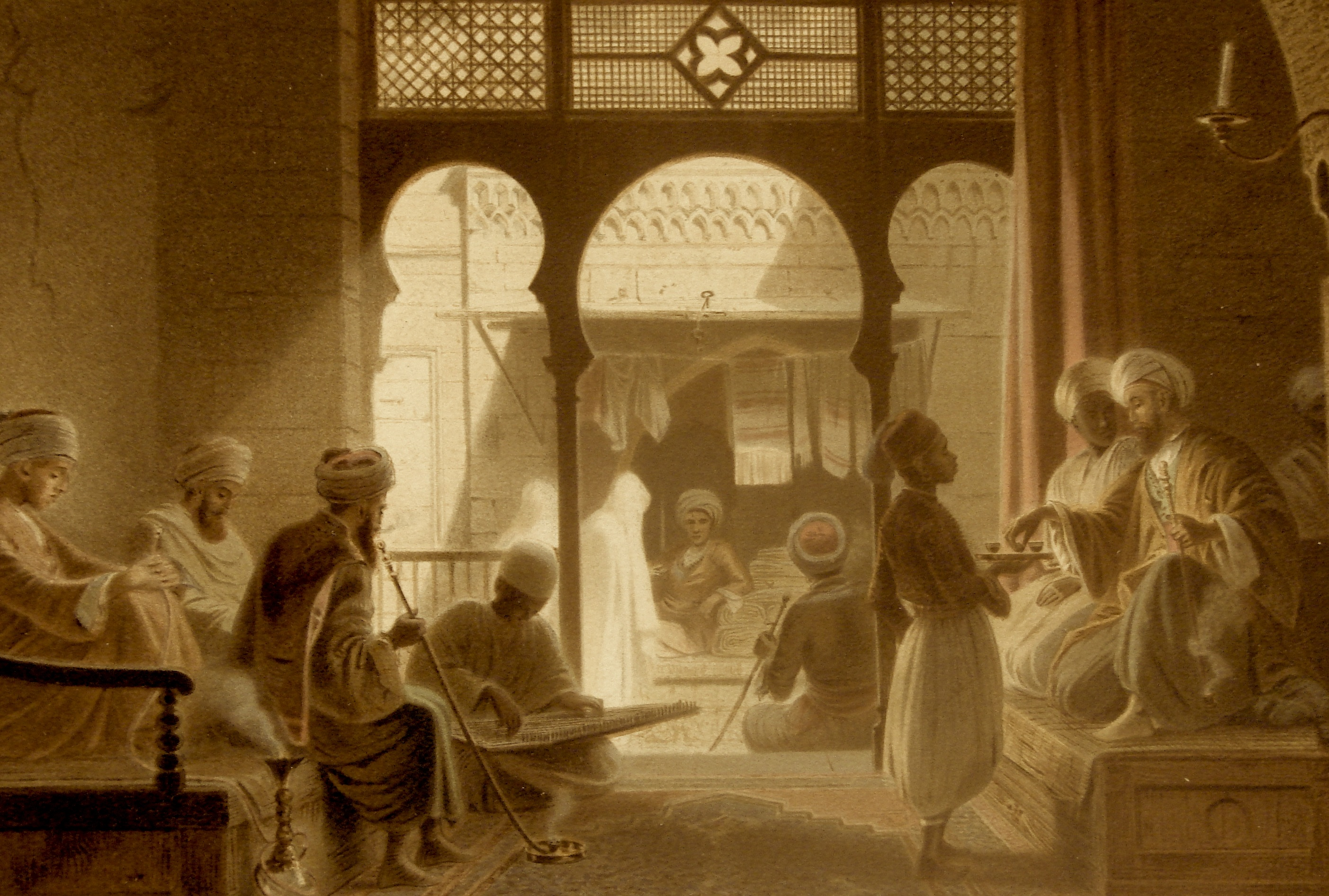
Men gathering in a coffeehouse in Cairo, 18th Century

The Qur’an emphasizes the importance of knowledge:

"Say, 'Are those who know equal to those who do not know?' Only those with understanding will take heed" (Qur'an 39:9).

As written in the Qur'an and Hadith, the pursuit of knowledge (talab al-'ilm) has always been a central value within Islamic civilization. This verse elevates the seeker of knowledge and helps explain why coffeehouses historically became hubs of learning. The principle of knowledge dissemination was expressed in various forms, such as the majlis al-’ilm (مجلس العلم, scholarly gatherings) held in mosques and the renowned Bayt al-Hikma (House of Wisdom) in Baghdad. In cities such as Cairo, Istanbul, and Damascus, coffeehouses evolved into formal salons where theologians, poets, and scholars engaged in animated discourse, reflecting the intellectual dynamism of Islamic society. Beyond these formal settings, coffeehouses provided more accessible venues for intellectual and artistic exchange, nurturing curiosity and debate while extending learning beyond the confines of madrasa elites and royal courts.

In the Arab world, these establishments became vibrant arenas of public dialogue, animated by spirited debates among writers, theologians, and poets that attracted wide audiences. The political realm was similarly influenced: during the first half of the 20th century, national liberation movements often convened in these spaces, which provided the ideal environment for coordinating diverse expressions of civic engagement. Coffeehouses also functioned as centers for the dissemination of newspapers, pamphlets, and other printed materials, enabling wider access to news and political ideas and contributing to the emergence of a more informed public. According to Ghenwa Tanios Antonios, cafés in cities such as Cairo and Beirut not only encouraged literary exchange but also fostered a new form of collective consciousness, serving as informal "parliaments" where citizens debated issues of reform, nationalism, and modern identity. These discussions, often supported by the circulation of periodicals and serialized novels, created bridges between the intellectual elite and emerging urban middle class. Through this exchange, the coffeehouse became a catalyst for social modernization and the development of a public sphere where political thought, cultural critique, and artistic experimentation intersected.

From historic establishments of Istanbul and Baghdad to the lively cafés of Cairo and Damascus, these venues played a pivotal role in shaping political consciousness and collective identity. Yet, this dynamic role was not always welcomed by the authorities. Within the Ottoman Empire, officials frequently regarded coffeehouses with suspicion, fearing they might become breeding grounds for dissent and unregulated discussion. At various times, these establishments were either banned or placed under strict surveillance. Responding to such concerns, Sultan Murad IV famously prohibited coffee in the 17th century, along with tobacco and alcohol, viewing them as threats to public order and moral discipline.

Despite these restrictions, coffeehouse culture persisted, thriving underground and later reemerging as an essential part of urban life. Its resilience underscored the enduring significance of these spaces as a locus of open dialogue, intellectual exchange, and social connection. Moreover, scholars have noted that Middle Eastern coffeehouses anticipated what Jurgen Habermas would later term the public sphere: spaces where individuals meet to discuss literature and politics beyond the control of authorities. This tradition influenced later social and political movements in the 19th and early 20th centuries, illustrating how important coffeehouses used to be.

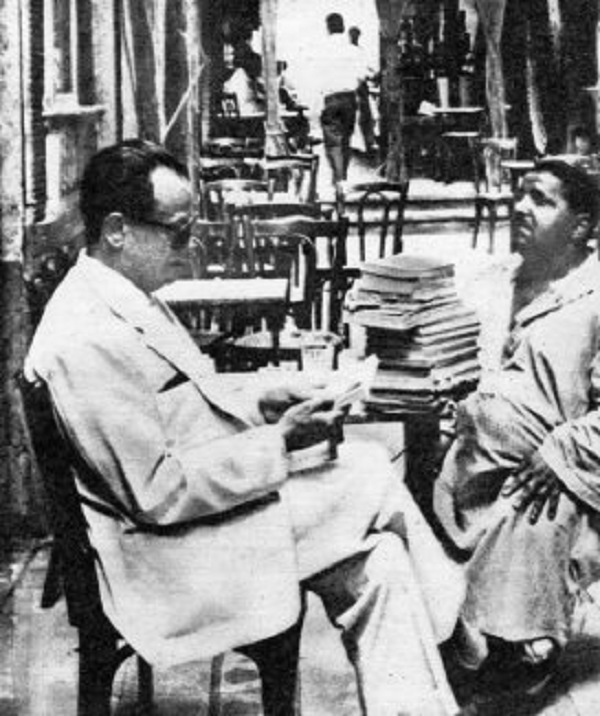
Nobel prize winner, Naguib Mahfouz, writing in an Arab Coffeehouse. 1968

Beyond politics, Arab coffeehouses also became vital incubators of artistic and literary creativity. Throughout the 19th and 20th centuries, writers and poets gathered within these establishments to share their work, critique one another's ideas, and engage in dynamic literary discussion. Iconic cafés in Cairo, including Cairo's Café Riche and El-Fishawi, emerged as renowned meeting places for intellectuals and artists, among them the Nobel Prize-winning author Naguib Mahfouz. Arabic poetry, particularly the zajal (oral poetry) tradition, flourished in these contexts. Poets engaged in impromptu verbal duels, improvising verse that both entertained and provoked thought. These poetic exchanges often contained subtle political or social critiques, using metaphor and symbolism to question authority in ways that direct speech could not, thereby transforming poetry into a vehicle of resistance as well as artistic expression.

From early reform movements to the 2011 Arab Spring, coffeehouses have remained sanctuaries for radical thought and activism. Even in the digital age, they continue to serve as spaces for collective dialogue, reflection, and the pursuit of knowledge, the very ideal the Qur'an so highly esteems. While modern movements were significantly empowered by social media, coffeehouses remained essential physical meeting places where individuals could gather, strategize, and build solidarity. In Tunisia, for example, activists used cafés as safe spaces while discussing the downfall of President Zine El Abidine Ben Ali. Similarly, in Egypt, coffeehouses were filled with young revolutionaries deliberating over the fate of President Hosni Mubarak.

In the 16th century, coffee sparked quite a debate across the Islamic world. Some religious leaders were so concerned about its energizing and stimulating effects that they grouped it with substances like alcohol and hashish, which were already forbidden. But others—scholars, doctors, and legal experts—stood up for coffee, arguing that it wasn't intoxicating and wasn't banned by Islamic law (shari'a). They highlighted its health benefits, its role in promoting wakefulness during prayer and study and its ability to foster community and intellectual exchange. Gradually, authorities accepted coffeehouses as legitimate places in Muslim society, valuing their contribution to urban culture and civic life.

== Modern Development ==
=== Architecture and Social Spaces ===
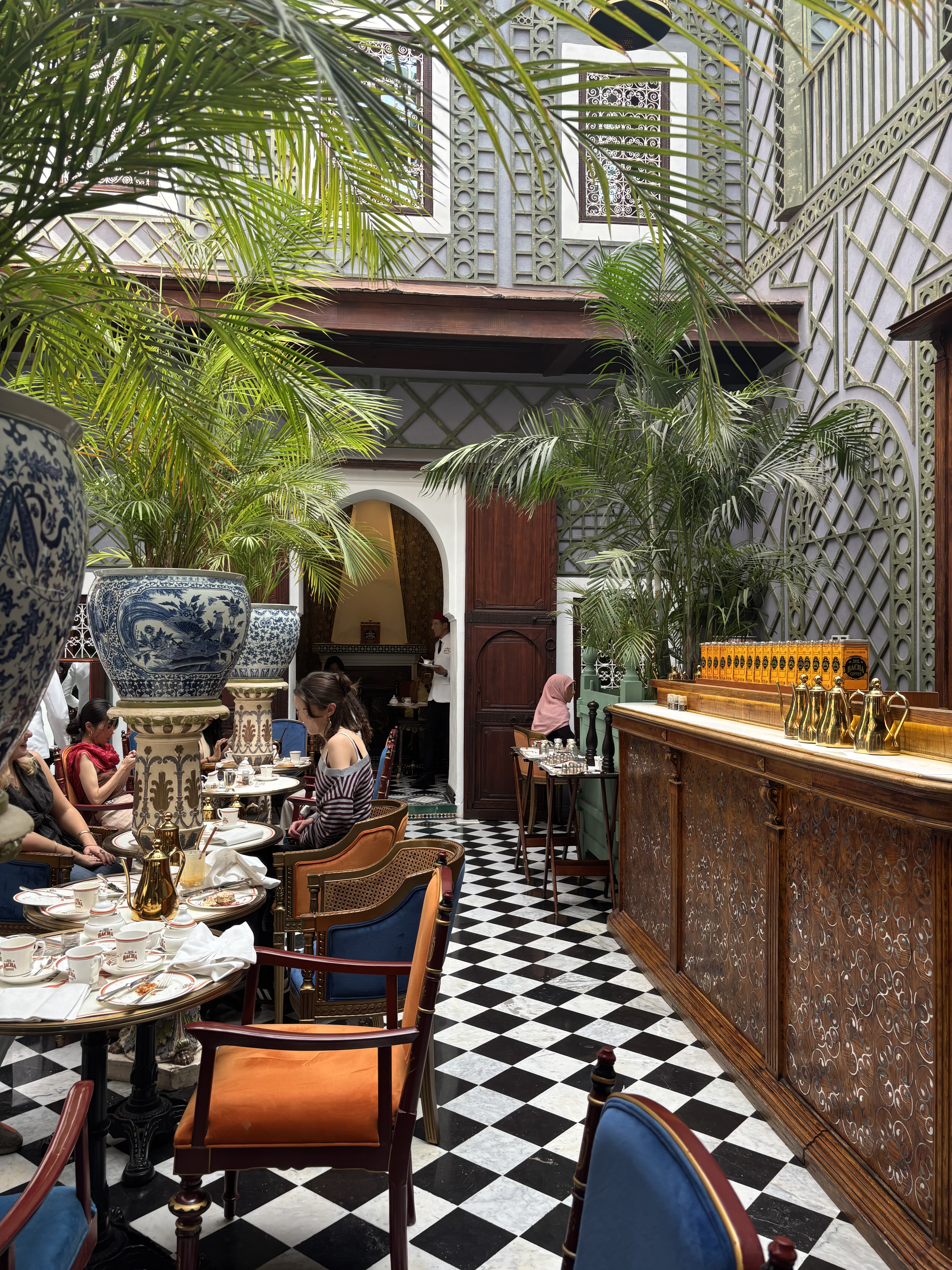
The inside of Bacha Coffee, a historical coffeehouse in Marrakech

Modern Coffeehouses in the Arab world blend contemporary designs with traditional aesthetics. Many cafés retain classic features such as ornate woodwork, mosaic tiles, brass lanterns, and low seating arrangements. This allows visitors to connect with the local culture while enjoying coffee. The visual design of these establishments also integrates cultural motifs, such as Arabic calligraphy or geometric patterns.

Beyond their visual appeal, Arab cafés continue to serve as crucial social spaces. In countries such as Saudi Arabia, modern cafés often host mahjar gatherings and exhibitions, linking the coffee experience with Arab tradition and cultural heritage. This combination has also been encouraged by UNESCO's recognition of Arabic and Khawalani coffee as Intangible Cultural Heritage, highlighting the importance of preserving coffee rituals while adapting them to contemporary lifestyles. There are many examples of traditional cafés that have preserved their culture while also adapting to the changing industry. Café Fahim is a historic coffeehouse located in Tripoli. It still maintains traditional coffeehouse features. It was founded in 1925 by Fahim Agha, who transformed an Ottoman bank into a café. After its closure in 2006, Café Fahim reopened in 2017, preserving its historical heritage. Remarkably, it remained open during Lebanon's civil war and the 2020 Beirut explosion.

Other traditional cafés include El-Fishawy Café, situated in Cairo and operating since the 18th century, and the Shabandar Café in Baghdad, long regarded as a meeting place for intellectuals, writers, and artists.

=== Competition and Branding ===
During the 21st century, traditional coffeehouses have faced growing competition from modern cafés and international coffee chains, such as Starbucks and Costa Coffee, which have a significant presence in the region.

The expansion of these international coffee chains has also influenced linguistic practices in the region. In Saudi Arabia, for example, many cafés now feature English names or transliterated forms alongside Arabic terms. This reflects a process of glocalisation. While younger customers tend to favour cafés that integrate these practices, older consumers are more receptive to Arabic terms. This combination of heritage, innovation, and strategic branding reflects cultural shifts in urban lifestyles, where social interaction, aesthetic experience, and globalised influences coexist with more traditional practices.

Social media has amplified this trend, as cafés with visually appealing interiors have become increasingly popular destinations. Platforms such as Instagram and Facebook have played a significant role in promoting cafés where the ambience and visual experience are central. The combination of these elements has put additional pressure on traditional coffeehouses, causing many of them to shut down. Contemporary cafés tend to merge traditional techniques, like brewing gahwa and serving it in finjan cups, with specialty coffee options, such as Arabica espresso and cardamom-infused drinks.

== Arabic and European Coffeehouses ==
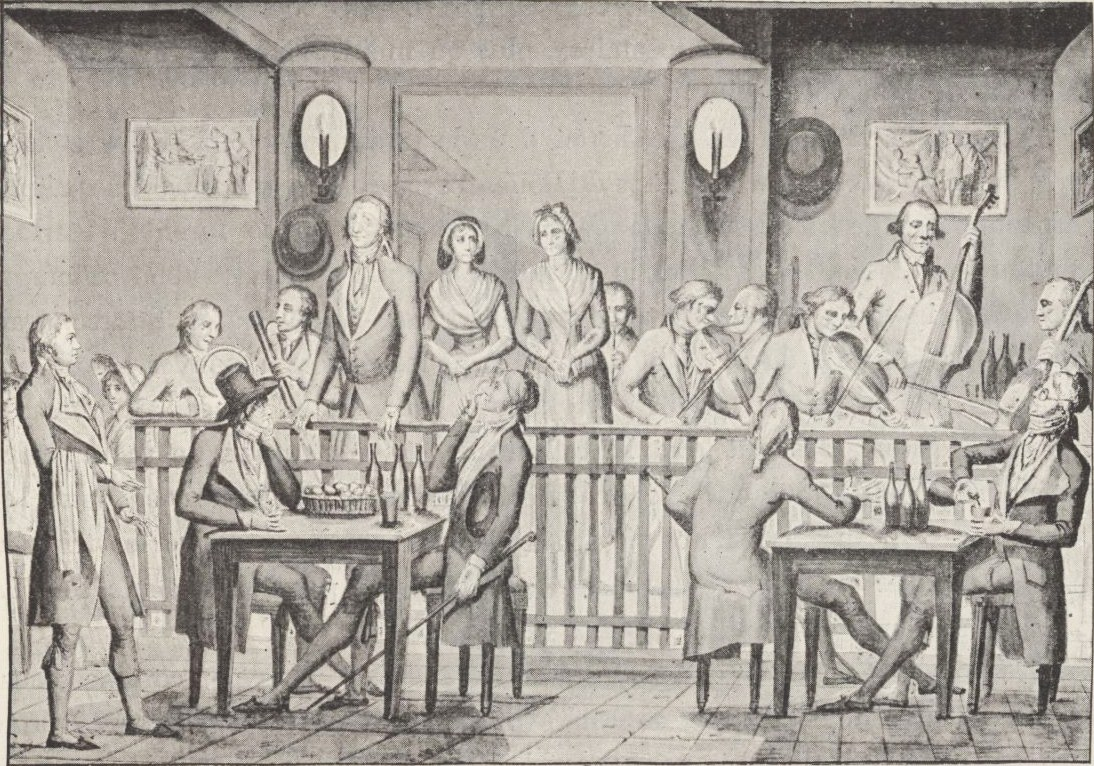
Le Café des Aveugles, Paris, c. 1800 – people socializing in a European coffeehouse.

Arabic and European coffeehouses both served as important social spaces, but they developed differently. The earliest coffeehouses emerged in Yemen and spread to Europe during the 17th century, reaching ports such as Venice, Marseille, London, and Amsterdam.

European coffeehouses emerged as places where merchants, writers, and professionals gathered to share news, discuss literature, and debate political ideas. City authorities often regulated these establishments. In Hamburg, municipal licensing integrated coffeehouses into urban life, forming a "burgherly public sphere”. European coffeehouses were typically designed to facilitate conversation and business, reflecting their role as hubs of sociability and intellectual exchange.

Arabic coffeehouses, or maqāhī, developed within Arab social traditions, emphasizing hospitality, communal bonds, and cultural continuity. They functioned as spaces for dialogue, the sharing of stories, poetry, and cultural knowledge. UNESCO recognizes these establishments as “a call for peace and dialogue within and across countries,” highlighting their role in fostering community and understanding. They emphasize hospitality and cultural continuity.

Despite these differences, both traditions aimed to bring people together. European coffeehouses promoted discussion in literature, philosophy, and politics, while Arabic coffeehouses supported social cohesion, generosity, and shared identity. Differences in regulation and design reflect the values of their respective societies: European cafés are shaped by civic oversight and commerce, while Arabic coffeehouses are rooted in hospitality and tradition.

=== Eurocentric Narratives ===
Introduced to Europe by Venetian merchants in the 17th century, coffee was initially known as "Mahometan gruel". Its association with Islam and the Ottoman Empire was reflected in the names of early European coffeehouses, such as "Turk's Head" and "The Sultan's Head". Over time, however, these associations faded, and coffee gradually became embedded within European culture. By the 19th century, within the British Empire's colonies, it had been fully naturalized as a British commodity, its Islamic origins largely forgotten.

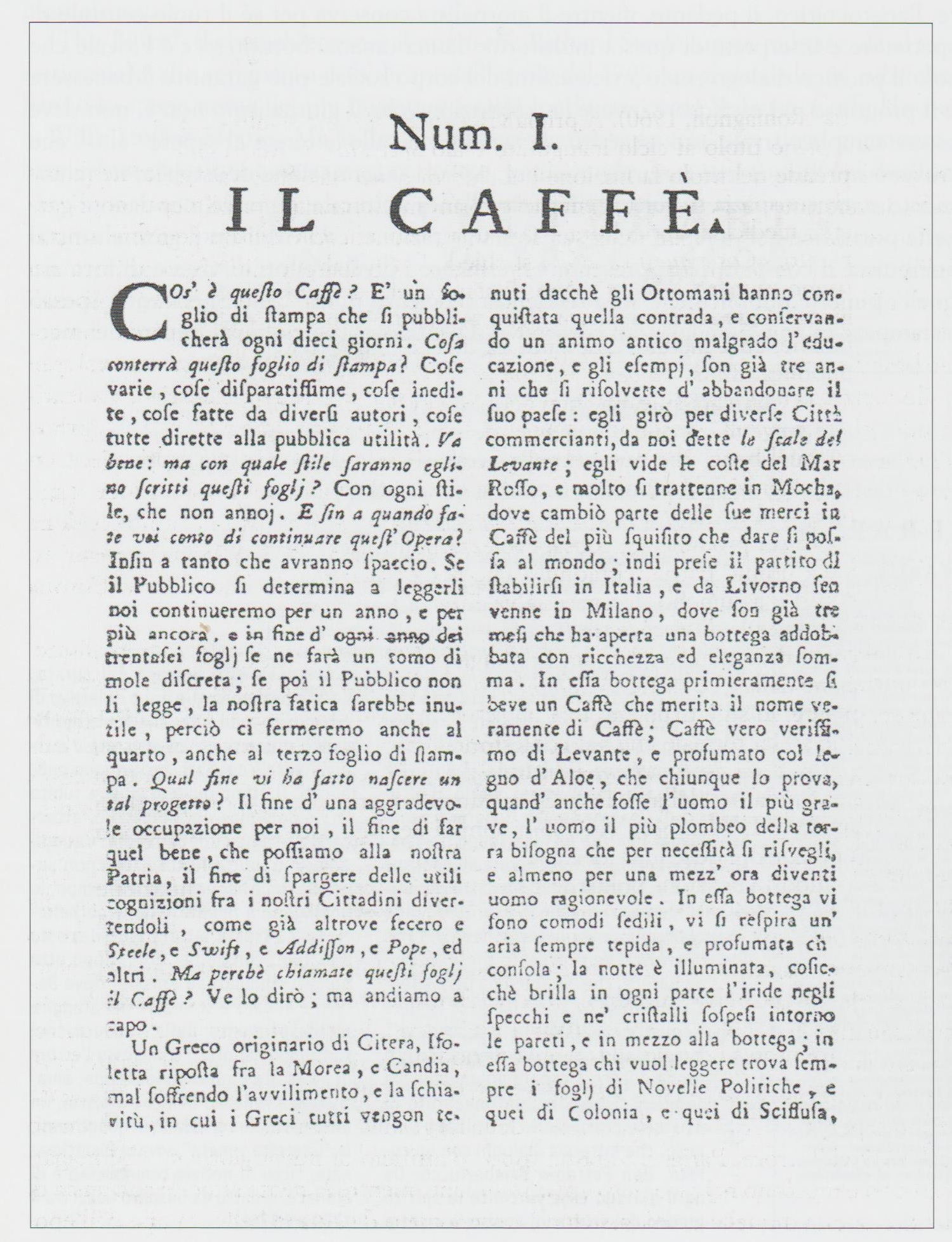
Front page of "Il Caffè"'s first edition, Milan 1764

In France, philosophers such as Voltaire, Diderot, and Rousseau were frequent visitors to the cafés of Paris. Among the most renowned was the Café Procope, founded in 1686 by the Sicilian entrepreneur and chef Francesco Procopio dei Coltelli, which became a meeting place for writers, actors, journalists, and emerging revolutionaries. The café played a significant role in the dissemination of philosophical and political ideas, hosting figures such as Maximilien Robespierre.

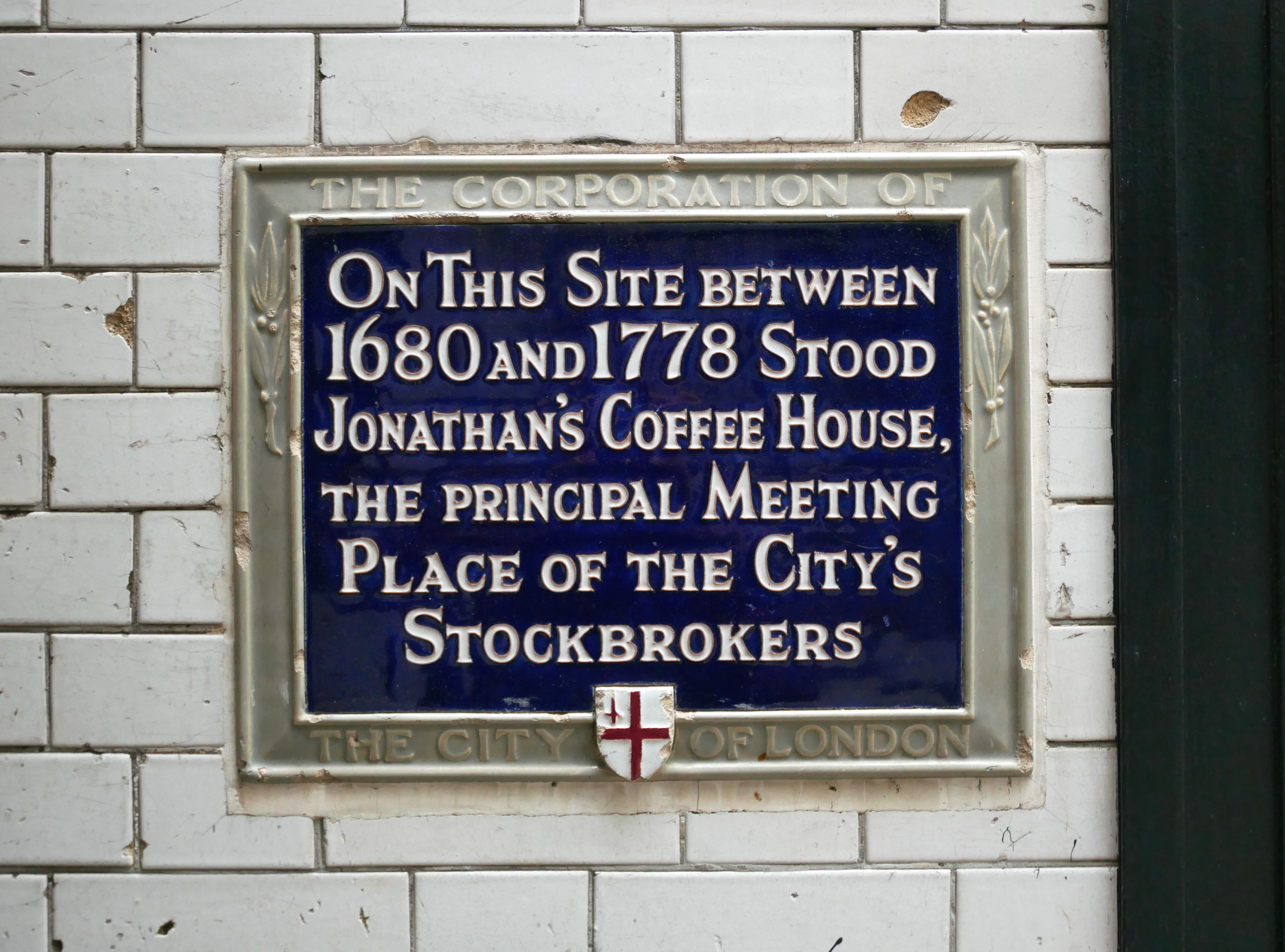
Plaque that marks the historical site of Jonathan's Coffee House, the precursor of the London Stock Exchange. Exchange Alley, City of London

In England, meanwhile, London's coffeehouses fulfilled a similar role. Each establishment tended to attract a distinct clientele, merchants, scholars, journalists, or politicians, and some evolved into specialized hubs for scientific, literary, or financial exchange, helping to shape the intellectual fabric of British Society. In London, Lloyd's Coffee House was the meeting place for shipbrokers and traders. The coffeehouse rapidly evolved into a global insurance and reinsurance market known as Lloyd's of London. Similarly, Jonathan's Coffee House in Exchange Alley became the meeting point for financiers and it is considered to be the precursor of the London Stock Exchange.

In general, during the 18th century, European coffeehouses became the main venues from which the values of the Enlightenment were spread. These establishments functioned as informal academies where science, politics, and philosophy were discussed by scholars, merchants, and common citizens. European philosophers and intellectuals valued coffee and the sociability it fostered so much that in 1764 Pietro and Alessandro Verri, together with Cesare Beccaria named their Milan-based periodical "Il Caffè", the Italian word for "coffee".

== See also ==
- Coffeehouse culture of Baghdad
- Ottoman coffeehouse
