= Alifa Rifaat =

Egyptian Muslim feminist and writer

- أليفة رفعت
- Alifa Rifaat (1988)
- Born: Fatima Abdullah Rif'at; June 5, 1930; Cairo, Kingdom of Egypt
- Died: January 1, 1996 (aged 65); Cairo, Egypt

Fatimah Rifaat (June 5, 1930 – January 1996), better known by her pen name Alifa Rifaat (Arabic: أليفة رفعت), was an Egyptian author whose controversial short stories are renowned for their depictions of the dynamics of female sexuality, relationships, and loss in rural Egyptian culture. While taking on such controversial subjects, her protagonists remained religiously faithful with passive feelings towards their fate. Her stories did not attempt to undermine the patriarchal system; rather they were used to depict the problems inherent in a patriarchal society when men do not adhere to their religious teachings that advocate for the kind treatment of women. Rifaat used the pseudonym Alifa to prevent embarrassment on the part of her family due to the themes of her stories and her writing career.

== Life ==
Fatma Abdullah Rifaat was born on June 5, 1930, in Cairo, Egypt. Her father was an architect and her mother was a housewife. Her family boasted that their roots extend back to Umar ibn al-Khattab, a companion and advisor to the prophet Muhammad.

Rifaat was raised in provincial Egypt and spent most of her life there. Subsequently, rural Egypt became the setting for most of her stories. Her active interest in writing began at age nine when she wrote a poem expressing the despair in her village. For this she was punished by her family, due to the poem's subject matter.

Rifaat attended Misr al-Jadidah Primary school and the Cultural Center for Women for her intermediate education. She also attended the British Institute in Cairo from 1946 to 1949, where she studied English. When she expressed interest in continuing her education by enrolling in the College of Fine Arts in Egypt, her father instead arranged for her to marry her cousin, a police officer.

For the first few years of their marriage, her husband allowed her to write and publish stories under her pseudonym, despite the common idea in Egyptian culture that writing was a purely masculine field. She published her stories from 1955 until 1960, when she chose to stop after pressure from her husband to end her writing career. During this nearly 14-year period of literary silence, Rifaat pursued the study of literature, astronomy, and history. Despite her attempts at preoccupation through these means, she remained frustrated at her inability to express herself and the societal issues she faced as a woman.

In 1973, after facing a serious illness, Rifaat's husband allowed her to write and publish her work. She published a collection of short stories and two novels, beginning with the short story "My World of the Unknown," for which she gained initial popularity.

Rifaat's husband died in 1979. Although she had travelled across provincial Egypt in accordance with his transfers for work, she never left Egypt until after his death. She made the [hajj], the sacred pilgrimage to Mecca, in 1981, and travelled to multiple European and Arab states including England, Turkey, Germany, Morocco, and Austria.

Throughout her life, Rifaat became a member of the Federation of Egyptian Writers, the Short-Story Club, and the Dar al-Udaba (Egypt). She also attended the First International Women's Book Fair (London, England) in 1984, where she spoke about the rights of women in Islam and the topic of polygamy.

In 1984, she received the Excellency Award from the Modern Literature Assembly.

Fatimah Rifaat died at the age of 65 in January 1996. She was survived by three sons. She left behind a body of over 100 works that have been translated into multiple languages and have been produced for television. Some of her works have also been read on BBC.

== Literary work ==
Rifaat wrote in Arabic throughout her literary career. Her style, though focusing more on romance in the beginning of her career, later shifted to social critique after she met translator Denys John-Davies. Denys also persuaded her to write in a more colloquial style of Arabic, which, although being a more accessible form of writing to the Egyptian population, was also then a less desired form of writing than the formal style.

Her novels and short stories have been translated into multiple languages, including English, German, Dutch, and Swedish. The most popular English translation of her work is of her collection Distant View of a Minaret and Other Short Stories, translated by Denys Johnson-Davies.

Rifaat, unlike the prominent Egyptian feminist Nawal El Saadawi, focused her writing on women in traditional Islamic roles. In her autobiography, she describes her father's lack of affection towards her as a possible root of her exploration of the needs and desires of men in terms of women. She says that throughout her life she found that "all men seek is pleasure. For that reason I cry out for complete and complementary love in all my writings." She also expresses in her autobiography the need for men and women to only participate in intercourse when they are in a serene state, so that orgasm can be achieved, which she believes acts to strengthen faith in God.

Rifaat's writing centers upon the silent plight of women in a patriarchal Muslim society. Her stories mainly take place in provincial Egypt. These stories handle themes such as sex, death, marriage, masturbation, clitoridectomy, love, teenage pregnancy, widowhood, and loss, along with other controversial topics. During this time, a woman was considered a purely sexual being, and the allowance of freedom of her sexuality was feared to result in fitna, or societal chaos. Although Rifaat strove to express the sexual repression of women, her stories and her life were conducted in an orthodox Muslim manner, and she did not advocate the rise of women against patriarchy. Most of her female protagonists take a resigned or begrudgingly accepting stance towards the hardships they face. For Rifaat, patriarchy was merely a fact of life, and was acceptable under Quranic terms, but it is the opposite and in some instances even the same gender's lack of observance towards religious teachings that acts as the catalyst to many of the protagonists' problems. In her stories, many of the sexual encounters take place during the characters' marriage, and there is no instance of extra-marital male-female relationships, as this would be considered purely sinful under the practice of Islam.

Some of Rifaat's most popular stories include "Distant View of a Minaret," "Bahiyya’s Eyes," and "My World of the Unknown."

=== "Distant View of a Minaret" ===
"Distant View of a Minaret" opens with a husband and wife having intercourse. The story is told from the wife's point of view, and it is quickly revealed that she is both uninterested and feels estranged from her husband. She recalls how in the past she attempted to express her desire for sexual satisfaction to her husband, which was met with denial and anger. At some point during the act she becomes aware of the call to prayer. Afterwards, she performs necessary ablutions and her prayers, a ritual with which she feels more in touch than her own relationship with her husband. She looks out the window at a minaret, recalling that there used to be a view of multiple minarets before new buildings blocked them out. The husband suffers a heart attack while still in bed, and dies. In the end, the protagonist is dully surprised at how calm she has remained during and after her husband's death.

This story conveys the passive female sexual role as pushed by selfish male domination of the sexual relationship in marriage. The lone minaret likely represents the solitude that the female protagonist experiences, having resigned herself to this role.

=== "Bahiyya's Eyes" ===
"Bahiyya's Eyes" is told from the perspective of the aged Bahiyya, speaking to her daughter after visiting a doctor about her loss of sight. Although the doctor's diagnosis attributes her loss of sight to natural causes and tells her she can be treated with medication, she knows that her blindness is instead due to all of the tears she has cried because of her life as a woman. Bahiyya then recounts her childhood, her clitoridectomy by the women of her village, her widowhood and the hardships of raising children as a single mother.

This story tackles the issue of suppression of female sexuality through describing the events of Bahiyya's childhood. She laments the position of women in society and the upholding of their low status by members of both genders.

"Bahiyya" is also a name for Egypt.

=== "My World of the Unknown" ===
"My World of the Unknown" centers on a woman who enters a sexual awakening with the aid of a jinni. When the woman and her husband move into a house, she discovers a female jinni in the form of a snake who teaches her the height of sexual pleasure. The woman remains with the snake, despite her confusion, until her husband kills another snake in the yard, violating the code of the jinni, at which point the female jinni leaves.

This story deals with the issue of feminine pleasure. Although the wife does have an affair with the jinni, since the creature is female, it is not considered adultery.

== List of collective works ==
- Eve Returns to Adam (1975), Arabic, series of romances largely devoid of social critique
- Who Can Man Be? (1981), Arabic, proved to be very controversial and was not sold in most Egyptian stores
- The Prayer of Love (1983), Arabic
- Distant View of a Minaret and Other Stories (1983), English translation
- On a Long Winter's Night (1980), Arabic
- The Pharaoh's Jewel (1991), Arabic - historical novel
- A House in the Land of the Dead (unfinished), Arabic

== Tribute ==
On June 5, 2021, Google celebrated Rifaat's 91st birthday with a Google Doodle.

== Sources ==
- Liya, L. (1999). "My World of the Unknown": A Catharsis for the Sexual Awakening of an Egyptian Woman Writer. Community Review, 1771.
- Nkealah, N. (2008). Reconciling Arabo-Islamic culture and feminist consciousness in North African women's writing: silence and voice in the short stories of Alifa Rifaat and Assia Djebar Tydskrif vir Letterkunde, 45(1), 19–41.
- Alifa Rifaat. (n.d.).
- Hatem, M. (1986). The Lives Behind the Politics [Review of the book Two Women in One Distant View of a Minaret and Other Stories A Bridge through Time A Wife for My Son Jana Gough Nawal el-Saadawi Osman Nusairi Alifa Rifaat Denys Johnson Davies Laila Said Ali Ghalem G. Kazolias]. The Women's Review of Books, 3(10), 10–11. JSTOR 4019948
- Rifaat, A. (1983). Distant View of a Minaret and Other Short Stories (J. Davies, Trans.). Quartet Books Limited.
- "Fatimah Rifat." Crosshatching in Global Culture; A Dictionary of Modern Arab Writers: An Updated English Version of R.B. Campbelll's "Contemporary Arab Writers." Ed. John J Donohue and Leslie Tramontini. Vol. II. Lebanon: Orient-Institut, 2004. Print. 2 vols.
- El Shakry, Hoda. “Jinn and Jins: Sensuous Piety as Queer Ethics.” The Cambridge Journal of Postcolonial Literary Inquiry (2023): 1–25. Web.
