= Salma al-Malaika =

Iraqi poet (1908–1953)

- سلمى الملائكة
- Born: Salma Abdul Razzaq al-Malaika; 29 February 1908; Baghdad, Baghdad Vilayet, Ottoman Iraq, Ottoman Empire (now Iraq)
- Died: 26 June 1953 (aged 45); London, UK
- Resting place: Brookwood Cemetery
- Occupation: Poet
- Spouse: Sadiq al-Malaika (m. 1923)
- Children: 7, including Nazik Al-Malaika
- Writing career
- Pen name: Umm Nizār
- Language: Arabic
- Notable works: The Song of Glory, 1965

Salma Abdul Razzaq al-Malaika (Note: Also transliterated as Sulaymah al-Malāʿikah.) (Arabic: سلمى الملائكة; 29 February 1908 – 26 June 1953), known by the pen name Umm Nizār, was an Iraqi poet. Al-Malaika's work focused on Women's rights and Iraqi and Arab nationalism.

== Early life ==
Al-Malaika was born in on the 29 February 1908 in Baghdad, Ottoman Empire (present-day, Iraq) to a Shīʿite family. Al-Malaika was the older sister of the poet and lawyer Abd al-Sahib Al-Malaika (Arabic: عبد الصاحب الملائكة).

== Poetry ==
Al-Malaika initially wrote poetry in secret, and educated herself in Arabic, Andalusian and Umayyad poetry, as well as Arabic history and pre-Islamic literature. Following the death of Iraqi poet Jamil Sidqi al-Zahawi in 1936, al-Malaika wrote an elegy for him expressing women's gratitude for his women's rights advocacy. It was published in newspapers and well received in Baghdad literary circles. She wrote using the pen name Umm Nizār. (Note: Al-Malaika's oldest son was named Nizār.)

Al-Malaika's poetry was traditional, both "in form and in its use of linguistic ornament". She wrote feminist verse, glorifying the role of Arab women in history and emphasising the predicament of modern Iraqi women, urging them to overcome difficulties as the "victims of ignorance, stagnation, and narrow-mindedness".

She also wrote poetry about patriotism and Iraq's struggle for independence. Her other poetry focussed on liberation movements in the Arab world and the Palestinian issue. Most of her collected poetry was written during the 1940s. Among the topics she addressed were the 1940 uprising of Rashid Ali al-Gaylani that led to the coup against the British, the 1948 Al-Wathbah uprising in Baghdad, and the 1948 tragedy of Palestine. In her poems about Palestine, she refers to it as a land of peace and martyrdom that was "stabbed in the heart" by the British issuance of the 1917 Balfour Declaration. She refers to the United Nations as the "league of disgraceful humiliation" and the Security Council as "the council of falsehoods". In her poems, she specifically addresses the Partition Plan for Palestine and the subsequent 1949 Armistice Agreements.

In 1965, al-Malaika's husband and daughter posthumously published The Song of Glory (Unshūdat al-Majd).

== Personal life ==
In 1923, al-Malaika married Sadiq al-Malaika, a poet and Arabic teacher, with whom she had 7 children. Her daughter was the poet Nazik al-Malaika, known for being one of the first Iraqi poets to use free verse.

On 26 June 1953 al-Malaika died in London, aged 45.
