= Mustafa Lutfi al-Manfaluti =

Egyptian litterateur

- مصطفى لطفي المنفلوطي
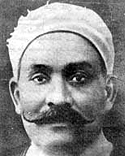
- Mustafa Lutfi el-Manfaluti
- Born: November 30, 1876; Manfalut, Egypt
- Died: July 25, 1924 (aged 47); Cairo, Egypt
- Education: Al-Azhar University
- Writing career
- Language: Arabic

Mustafa Lutfi el-Manfaluti (Arabic: مصطفى لطفي المنفلوطي, ALA-LC: Muṣtafá Luṭfī al-Manfalūṭī; 1876–1924) was an Egyptian writer, and poet who wrote a number of Arabic books. He was born in the Upper Egyptian city of Manfalut to an Egyptian father and a Turkish mother.

== Early life ==
el-Manfaluti memorized the Quran before the age of twelve. He studied at Al-Azhar University in Cairo. He translated, and novelized plays from French. Moreover, el-Manfaluti wrote and translated several short stories. He began writing Al-Nazarat in 1907, which is his most famous work, including a collection of his articles under the title: Al-Nazarat (Arabic: النظرات).

One of el-Manfaluti's most notable traits is that he couldn't read or speak French. He asked some of his friends to translate the play or the book to Arabic, then he rewrote them.

== Books ==
Some of his books include:

- Majdolin (Arabic: ماجدولين)
- Al-Abarat (The Tears) (Arabic: العبرات), first published in 1915.
- Ash-Sha'er (The Poet) (Arabic: الشاعر)
- Fee Sabeel Et-taj (For the Sake of the Crown) (Arabic: في سبيل التّاج)
- Al-Fadeela (Virtue) (Arabic: الفضيلة)
- Al-Nazarat (Views) (Arabic: النظرات)

== See also ==
- List of Egyptian authors
