= Saqt az-Zand =

Poetry collection by Al-Ma'arri

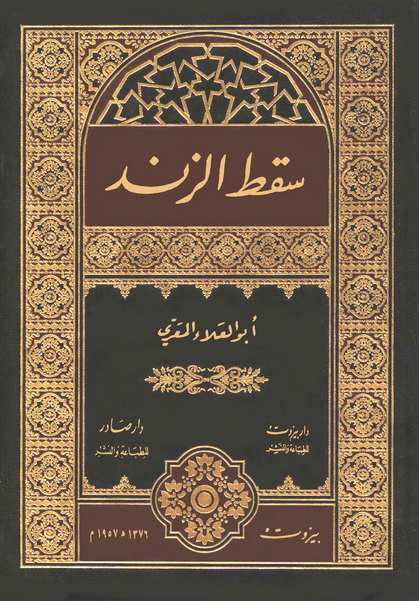
- Cover of a modern edition of Saqt az-Zand.
- Author: Abū l-ʿAlāʾ al-Maʿarrī
- Original title: سقط الزند
- Translator: Arthur Wormhoudt
- Language: Arabic
- Genre: Classical Arabic poetry, qasida anthology
- Publisher: Dar Sader
- Publication date: before 1020 CE
- Publication place: Abbasid-era Syria
- English publication date: 1972
- Media type: Print (poetry anthology)
- Pages: 125 (in English translation)
- Followed by: The Luzumiyat

Saqt az-Zand (Arabic: سقط الزند, romanized: Saqṭ az-Zand; also transliterated as Sikt al-Zand and translated as The Spark of the Fire Stick or The Falling Spark of Tinder) was the first collection of poetry by al-Ma'arri. It consists of seventy-four qasidas amounting to over three thousand lines, written in his youth and early adulthood, before the year 1020.

== Literary themes, style and language ==
The qasida form was a very common one in Arab poetry and one of its purposes was to serve as a vehicle for the praise of a patron or some other notable man. Al-Maarri’s earlier qasidas conformed to this tone and style, and were also notable for their undertone of Shia values. His work included an elegy on his late father. praise for Sa'd al-Dawla, various notables of Aleppo and librarians of Baghdad. It included his reactions to political events in contemporary Syria. He praised important individuals on all sides of the various conflicts that beset his homeland, including the Fatimid general Bandjutakin.

The Saqt as-Zand collection achieved great popularity when it was circulated in Baghdad. Although it occupies a central place in the canon of Arabic literature it is relatively unknown to readers who do not speak the language, perhaps because of the extraordinary difficulty of translating its dense, erudite verse. The title of the collection itself poses challenges of comprehension and translation. 'Saqt' means 'spark' but the more usual meaning is 'falling', evoked in the English translation 'The Falling Spark of the Tinder'. 'Zand' was a fire drill; the commentator al-Khwarazimi said that title was an allusion to the effort required to grasp the meaning of the verses, similar to the effort involved in producing fire from friction between two pieces of wood.

The most important elements in this work are al-Ma'arri's maxims and his reflections on life and death, on human nature and aspirations, and on his own life and its contradictions. The collection did not however display the intense philosophy and erudition of al-Ma’arri’s later work, the Luzūmiyyāt. Rather this early poetry was more sensitive and personal, full of vigour and virtuosity with elements of riddle and wordplay.

In the preface to the work, the Khutbat Saqt al-Zand, al-Ma’arri stated that he had not composed poetry with the aim of obtaining reward and expressed his reservations about the traditional praise function of the qasida. Because the qasida form demanded a ‘madih’ (praise) section, he stated that he had included these as technical exercises and tests of his talent. He believed that abundant praise was rightly due to God and not to any man. The work shows the influence of al-Mutanabbi.

The final poem in the collection is his Farewell Ode, in which al-Ma’arri said goodbye to his admirers in Baghdad and expressed his regret at his failure to establish himself there as he had hoped to do, before returning to his hometown of Ma'arrat al-Nu'man.

In Ma’arrat al-Nu’man there is a marble monument to al-Ma’arri on which is carved a verse from Saqt az-Zand: "Let the rain refrain from watering me and my land, if its clouds do not cover the whole country.” This line is preceded by another in the same vein: "If immortality had been offered to me exclusively, I would not have accepted to be the sole beneficiary.”

== Reception and critical scholarship in the Arab world ==
The first scholarly study of Saqt as-Zand was undertaken by al-Ma’arri himself. After his return to Ma'arra and his self-isolation, he worked on a critical commentary of his youthful work. This commentary, known as Dhou as-Saqt (ضوءالسقط or “The Light of the Spark”) was dictated to his amanuensis Aboû Zakaryâ at-Tabrîzî, but never put into circulation. The young at-Tabrizi, drawn to al-Ma’ari by his desire to learn from the author of Saqt as-Zand, later made a new, much larger commentary of his own. It is this commentary which was later published under the title of Sharh at-Tanwīr ‘ala Saqt az-Zand (“Explanation of the Enlightenment of Saqt az-Zand”) in Boulaq in AH 1286 (1869-70 CE).

Known historic commentaries on Saqt as-Zand are:

- Al-Ma’arri’s own commentary Dhou as-Saqt
- The improved version by Abu Zakariya Yahya ibn Ali Al-Tabrizi
- Commentary by al-Batalyawsi (d.527/1227)
- ”ضرام السقط” (“Dirām as-Saqt” or “Igniting the Spark”) by Sadr al-Afdal Qasim ibn Husain al-Khwarazimi (d.617/1220)
- ”التنوىر على سقط الرند” (“At-Tanwīr ‘ala Saqt az-Zand” or “The Enlightenment of Saqt az-Zand”) by al-Khuwwi al-Nahwi (c.532/1137)
- Commentary on the armour-poems in Saqt az-Zand by al-Qādisi (1075/1665)
- شرح القصيدة اللامية (”Sharh al-Qasida al-lāmiya” or “Explanation of the Shining Qasida”) by Ibn al-Azm (1285/1868)

In addition scholars across the Arab world held Saqt az-Zand in high regard. For example the work was discussed in the Fihrist of Ibn Khayr al-Ishbili (d. 1200), while poet and historian Ibn Bassām al-Shantarīnī (d. 1147) cited it extensively in his “Al-Dhakhīra fī Mahāsin Ahl al-Jazīra” (Treasury of the Merits of the Folk of the [Iberian] Peninsula).

== Early European scholarship ==
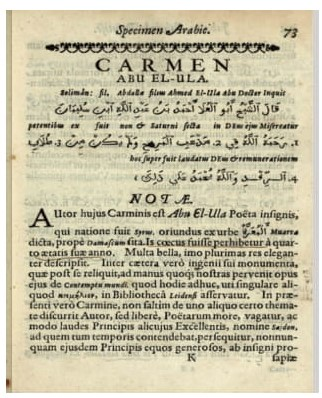
Extract from Saqt az-Zand in Fabricius' 1638 "Specimen Arabicum"

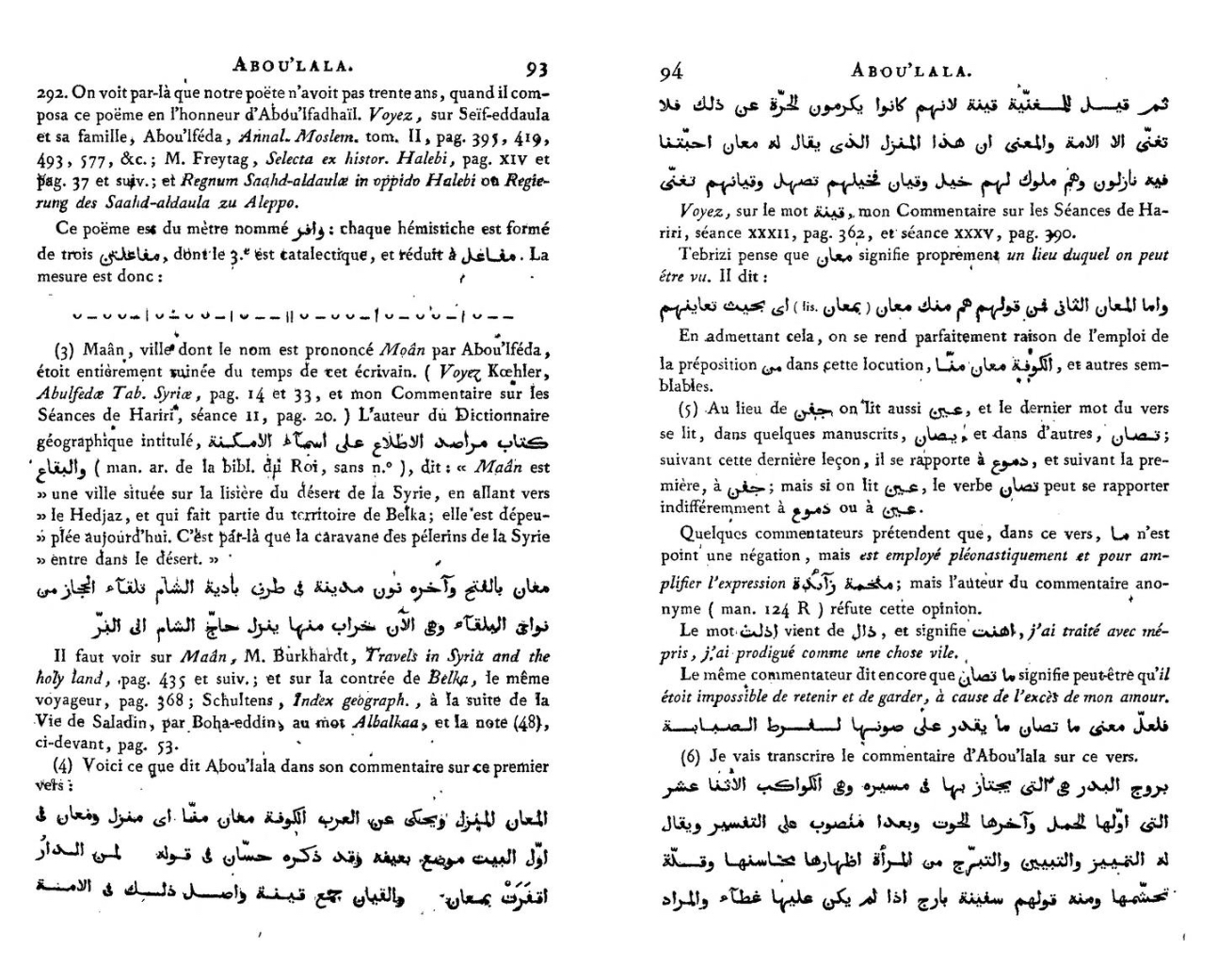
Extracts and analysis of "Saqt az-Zand" in Silvestre de Sacy's "Chrestomathie Arabe"

The Dutch Arabist Erpenius and his pupil Jacobus Golius collected manuscripts, and Golius purchased a copy of Dhou as-Saqt, now held in the collections of the University of Leiden. He also published a few short extracts of al-Ma'arri's work in his 1656 edition of Erpinius' work on Arabic grammar. The first publication of selections from Saqt az-Zand in a European scholarly work was in the collection Specimen Arabicum, a 1638 anthology of Arabic literature by Johann Fabricius published in Gdańsk.

The work that brought Saqt az-Zand to the attention of a wider European audience was Silvestre de Sacy's 1827 work Chrestomathie Arabe. This included the Arabic text of extracts from the collection, together with a translation and notes on particular passages.

== Modern editions and translations ==
Modern scholarly interest in Saqt as-Zand dates from 1914 when Taha Hussein defended his PhD thesis on the work. Taha Hussein was also the editor in chief of the 1945 National Library of Egypt five-volume edition of Saqt az-Zand with the seventy-four poems that make up the collection, eight others included in appendices and an additional collection of thirty-one poems known as Al-Dariyyat which are commonly published with Saqt az-Zand. This edition also included more than two thousand pages of commentary from Al-Tabrizi, Ibn al-Sīd al-Baṭalyawsī and Al-Khwarazimi.

There is an English translation of Saqt az-Zand by Arthur Wormhoudt (1972). A selection of poems from the work was translated into Spanish for the first time and published in 2016.

== See also ==
- Risalat al-Ghufran
