= Paragraphs and Periods =

The Paragraphs and Periods (Full name: Paragraphs and Periods on the Glorification of God and Admonitions; Arabic: الفصول و الغايات في تمجيد الله و المواعظ, romanized: al-Fuṣūl wa-l-ghāyāt fī tamjīd Allāh wa-l-mawā'iẓ) is a collection of homilies in Arabic rhymed prose, authored by al-Ma'arri (d. 1058). The book faced historical accusations of being a deliberate imitation of the Quran.

There is no indication that al-Ma'arri intended his work to be viewed as a genuine competitor to the Quran or to assert any claims of divine revelation. Many Muslim contemporaries of al-Maʿarrī believed that his book ridiculed the Quran and condemned it. However, in subsequent centuries, many supporters argued that it represented genuine piety and true glorification of God. Modern scholars hold differing opinions; while some view it as a parody, others see it as a critique of conventional literature.
