= Ibn al-Sīd al-Baṭalyawsī =

Scholar from al-Andulus, 1052–1127

Abū Muḥammad ʿAbd Allāh ibn Muḥammad ibn al-Sīd al-Baṭalyawsī (Arabic: أَبُو مُحَمَّد عَبْد الله اِبْنُ مُحَمَّد اِبْنِ السَّيِّد الْبَطَلْيَوْسِيُ; 1052–1127), also spelled Ibn Assīd or Abenasid, was an Andalusian grammarian and philosopher. He is the earliest Islamic philosopher from the West whose works have survived.

Ibn al-Sīd was born in 1052 (year 444 of the Hijra) either in Silves or in Badajoz (Baṭalyaws) at the court of al-Muẓaffar, the Afṭasid ruler of Badajoz. He received a literary and grammatical education. His teacher was Abū l-Ḥasan ʿAlī ibn Aḥmad ibn Ḥamdūn al-Muqrīʾ al-Baṭalyawsī, called Ibn al-Laṭīniyya, who died in 1073. When Badajoz fell to the Almoravids in 1094, Ibn al-Sīd went to Teruel in the territory of the Banū Razīn. There he held the office of kātib (secretary) to the ruler, Abū Marwān ʿAbd al-Malik. After falling into disgrace, he fled to Toledo, then Zaragoza and finally Valencia. In Zaragoza, sometime before 1110, he met the young philosopher Ibn Bājja, whom he debated on the role of logic in grammar. He stayed in Zaragoza for about ten years. In Valencia, he taught Ibn Bashkuwāl. He died toward the end of July 1127 (521 of the Hijra) at Valencia.

Ibn al-Sīd wrote some 20 works on Arabic grammar, philology and philosophy. He wrote a fahrasa (an outline of his teachers and the works he studied under them) and commentaries on the Adab al-Kitāb of Ibn Qutayba, the Muwaṭṭaʾ of Mālik and the Saqṭ al-Zand of al-Maʿarrī. This last generated a strong response from Ibn al-ʿArabī and a counter from Ibn al-Sīd entitled al-Intiṣār mim-man ʿadala ʿan al-Istibṣār. The commentary on Ibn Qutayba was entitled Improvisation (al-Iqtiḍāb). He also wrote on theological differences within Islam in The Equitable Judgment on the Causes Originating Discrepancies in the Community (al-Inṣāf fī al-asbāb al-mūjiba li-khtilāf al-umma). His most important philosophical works are the Book of Questions (Kitāb al-Masāʾil) and the Book of Circles (Kitāb al-Ḥadāiʾq). The latter was translated into Hebrew twice (including by Samuel ibn Tibbon) and became influential in Jewish circles. Bahiya ibn Paquda and Isaac Abravanel used it. Among Muslims, it was known to Ibn Ṭufayl and Ibn Sabʿīn.

Ibn al-Sīd was one of the earliest philosophers to explicitly seek to reconcile the Islamic religion with the "sciences of the ancients". In the Book of Questions, he argues that philosophy and religion are two different means in pursuit of the same goal, the truth. Religion establishes the same truths by means of persuasion and imagination as philosophy does by demonstration. This is because some humans have insufficient understanding to grasp truths by demonstration. The demonstration of religion is ultimately to be found in miracles. Religion remains a necessary precondition for philosophy because the pursuit of truth depends on virtues that can only come from religion. In this reasoning, Ibn al-Sīd leans heavily on al-Fārābī.

In the Book of Circles, Ibn al-Sīd introduced emanationist metaphysics to al-Andalus. Ultimately derived from Neoplatonism and from the Neopythagorean Encyclopedia of the Brethren of Purity, partially through al-Fārābī, the metaphysical system of the Book of Circles is complex and eclectic. Ibn al-Sīd says that this system goes back to Socrates, Plato and Aristotle. The Agent Intellect enlightens human intellect and the perfection of the human being comes about through returning to its source by study of, in ascending order, mathematics, physics, metaphysics and theology. Then union with the Agent Intellect is attained. The fifth chapter deals with the question of negative theology, the seventh and final chapter with the immortality of the soul. This last was incorporated verbatim into the 13th-century Sicilian Questions.

== Bibliography ==
- Asín Palacios, Miguel (1940). "Ibn al-Sīd de Badajoz y su «Libro de los Cercos» («Kitāb al-Ḥadāiʾq»)". Al-Andalus. 5 (1): 45–154. ISSN 0304-4335.
- Beech, George (2008). The Brief Eminence and Doomed Fall of Islamic Saragossa: A Great Center of Jewish and Arabic Learning in the Iberian Peninsula During the 11th Century. Instituto de Estudios Islámicos y del Oriente Próximo.
- Geoffroy, Marc (2011). "al-Baṭalyūsī, Abū Muḥammad ibn al-Sīd". In Henrik Lagerlund (ed.). Encyclopedia of Medieval Philosophy. Springer. pp. 149–150. doi:10.1007/978-1-4020-9729-4_78. ISBN 978-1-4020-9728-7.
- Lévi-Provençal, Évariste (1960). "al-Baṭalyawsī". In Gibb, H. A. R.; Kramers, J. H.; Lévi-Provençal, E.; Schacht, J.; Lewis, B. & Pellat, Ch. (eds.). The Encyclopaedia of Islam, Second Edition. Volume I: A–B. Leiden: E. J. Brill. p. 1092. OCLC 495469456.
- Messier, Ronald A. (2010). The Almoravids and the Meanings of Jihad. Praeger.
- Peña Martín, Salvador (2007). Corán, palabra y verdad: Ibn al-Sīd y el humanismo en al-Andalus. Consejo Superior de Investigaciones Científicas.
- Rebollo Ávalos, María José (1997). "Sobre algunas personalidades notables del reino taifa de Badajoz" (PDF). Miscelánea de estudios árabes y hebraicos. Sección Arabe-Islám. 46: 267–275. ISSN 1696-5868.
- Serrano Ruano, Delfina (2002). "Ibn al-Ṣīd al-Baṭalyawsī (444/1052–521/1127): de los reinos de taifas a la época almorávide a través de la bibliografía de un ulema polifacético". Al-Qantara: Revista de estudios árabes. 23: 53–92. doi:10.3989/alqantara.2002.v23.i1.200. hdl:10261/19248. ISSN 0211-3589.
- Coelho, António Borges (1989). Portugal na Espanha Árabe. Vol. 2 (2 ed.). Editorial Caminho.
