= Quran imitations =

In literature

Quran imitations represent literary attempts to replicate the style, form and content of the Quran. Historically, they emerge in a dialectic with the doctrine of the i'jaz (inimitability) of the Quran, which asserts that the literary and/or semantic nature of the Quran cannot be reproduced (tahaddi) by a human. Both Muslims and non-Muslims have written Quran imitations for various reasons, including as literary exercises, means to express one's admiration for the Quran, or attempts to meet the Quran challenge (the Islamic challenge for someone who doubts the Quran to create something that is like it).

== Reasons ==
The Quran poses a falsification test to those who challenge its authenticity which, over time, was made easier. The first challenge was to produce a similar book in Arabic (17:88), then it was reduced to ten chapters (11:13). Lastly, the challenge was reduced to only one chapter similar to it (10:38). Islamic traditions suggest that the first attempts at imitation were blasphemous or aimed at asserting claims of divine revelation. However, historically, not all imitations were meant to contest the Quran's preeminence or supremacy; some were simply literary exercises. There are also instances of authors who intended to admire the Quran by imitating it.

== History ==
Towards the end of Muhammad's life and after his death several men and a woman appeared in various parts of Arabia and claimed to be prophets. Musaylimah, a contemporary of Muhammad, claimed that he received revelations; some of his revelations are recorded. Ibn al-Muqaffa' was a critic of the Qur'an and reportedly made attempts to imitate it. Bashshar ibn Burd (d. 784), Abul Atahiya (d. 828), al-Mutanabbi (d. 965), and al-Maʿarri (d. 1058) produced imitations of the Qur'an.

A famous case was the blind poet al-Ma'arri, particularly in his work titled Paragraphs and Periods. Included in his imitation were sections including saj' (a type of rhymed prose), series of rhyming oaths, messages about the punishment of unbelievers, hortatory and declarative statements, the frequent use of divine epithets, etc.

== List of works ==
=== Arabic ===
- Muʿāraḍat al-Qur'ān attributed to Ibn al-Muqaffa' (8th century)
- al-Fuṣūl wa al-ghāyāt [Paragraphs and Periods] (11th century)
- Muʿāraḍat al-Qur'ān attributed to al-Ḥillī (12/13th century)
- Qayyūm al-asmā [The Self-Subsisting of All Names] (1844)
- al-Bayān al-ʿarabī [The Arabic Elucidation] (1848)
- Awlād ḥāritinā [Children of Gebelawi] (1959)
- Āyat Jīm [The Verses of Gimel] (1992)
- al-Furqān al-ḥaqq [The True Criterion] (1999)

=== Other languages ===
- Cent noms de Déu [The One Hundred Names of God] by Ramon Llull (14th century); in Catalan
- Khayr al-Bayān [The Best Exposition] by Pir Roshan (1651); multilingual but mainly in Urdu
- Imitations of the Koran by Alexander Pushkin (19th century); in Russian
- Al Aaraaf by Edgar Allan Poe (1829); in English
- Finnegans Wake by James Joyce (1939); in English
