= Divine Comedy =

Italian narrative poem by Dante Alighieri

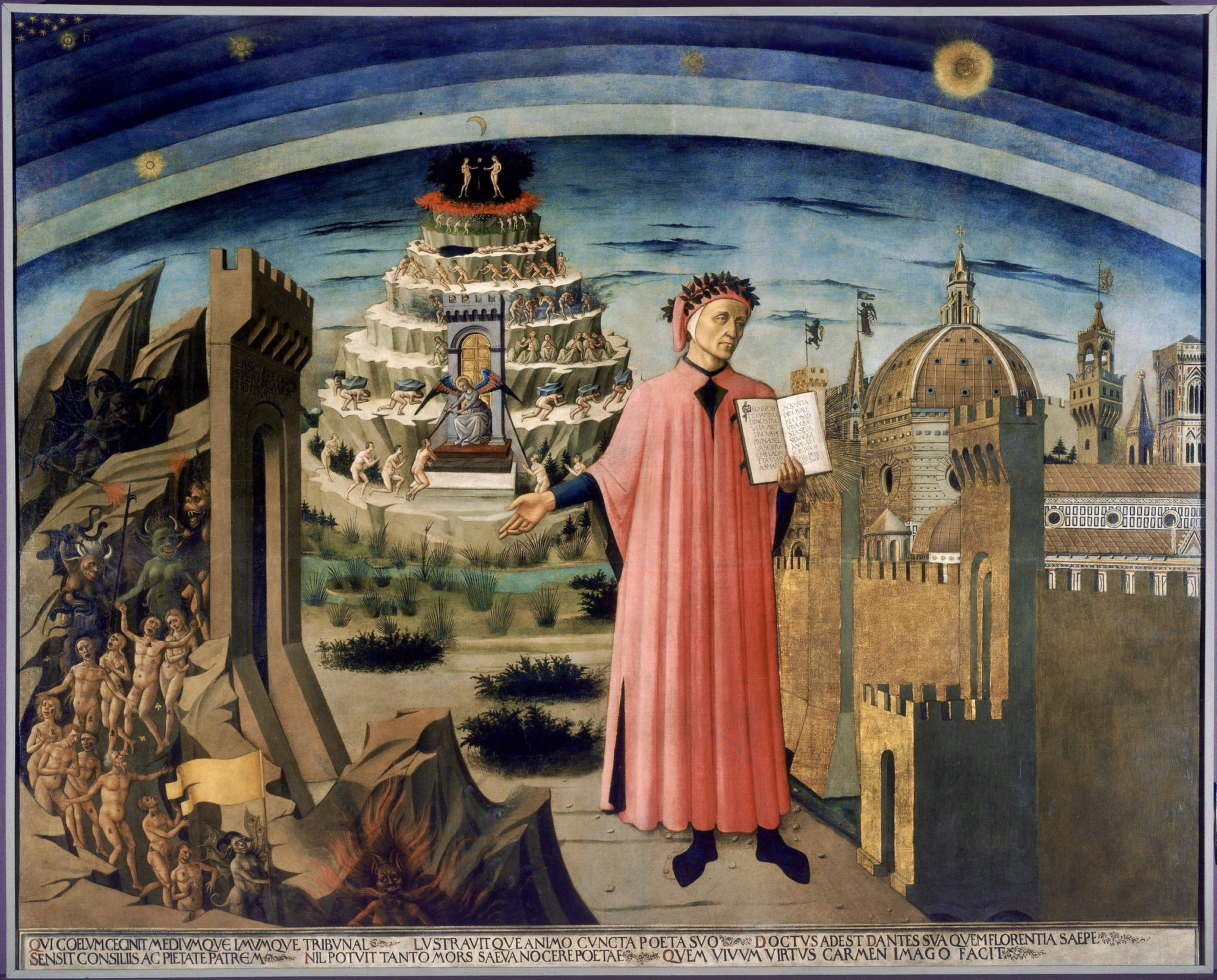
- Dante shown holding a copy of the Divine Comedy, next to the entrance to Hell, the seven terraces of Mount Purgatory and the city of Florence, with the spheres of Heaven above, in Domenico di Michelino's 1465 fresco
- Author: Dante Alighieri
- Language: Italian
- Genre: Narrative poem
- Publication date: c. 1321
- Publication place: Italy
- Text: Divine Comedy at Wikisource

The Divine Comedy (Italian: Divina Commedia) is an Italian narrative poem by Dante Alighieri, begun c. 1308 and completed c. 1321, shortly before the author's death. It is widely considered the pre-eminent work in Italian literature and one of the greatest works of Western literature. The poem's imaginative vision of the afterlife is representative of the medieval worldview as it existed in the Latin Church by the 14th century. It helped establish the Tuscan language, in which it is written, as the standardized Italian language. It is divided into three parts: Inferno, Purgatorio, and Paradiso.

The poem explores the condition of the soul following death and portrays a vision of divine justice, in which individuals receive appropriate punishment or reward based on their actions. It describes Dante's travels through Hell, Purgatory, and Heaven. Allegorically, the poem represents the soul's journey towards God, beginning with the recognition and rejection of sin (Inferno), followed by the penitent Christian life (Purgatorio), which is then followed by the soul's ascent to God (Paradiso). Dante draws on medieval Catholic theology and philosophy, especially Thomistic philosophy derived from the Summa Theologica of Thomas Aquinas.

In the poem, the pilgrim Dante is accompanied by three guides: Virgil, who represents human reason and who guides him for all of Inferno and most of Purgatorio; Beatrice, who represents divine revelation, in addition to theology, grace, and faith, and who guides him from the end of Purgatorio onwards; and Saint Bernard of Clairvaux, who represents contemplative mysticism and devotion to Mary the Mother, guiding him in the final cantos of Paradiso.

The work was originally simply titled Comedìa (pronounced [komeˈdiːa], Tuscan for "Comedy") – so also in the first printed edition, published in 1472 – later adjusted to the modern Italian Commedia. The earliest known use of the adjective Divina appears in Giovanni Boccaccio's biographical work Trattatello in laude di Dante ("Treatise in Praise of Dante"), which was written between 1351 and 1355 – the adjective likely referring to the poem's profound subject matter and elevated style. The first edition to name the poem Divina Comedia in the title was that of the Venetian humanist Lodovico Dolce, published in 1555 by Gabriele Giolito de' Ferrari.

== Structure and story ==
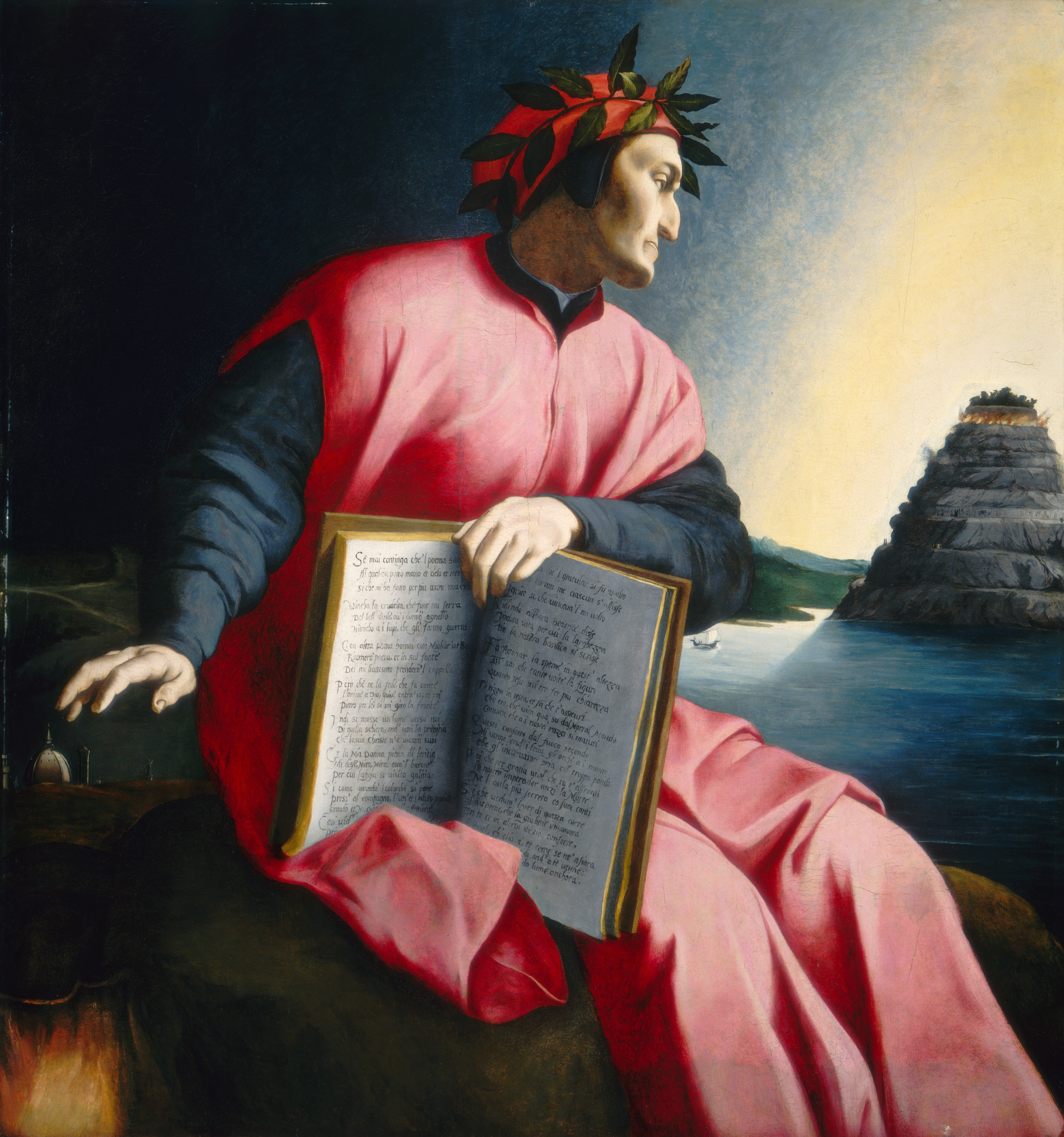
Dante gazes at Mount Purgatory in an allegorical portrait by Agnolo Bronzino, painted c. 1530

The Divine Comedy is composed of 14,233 lines that are divided into three cantiche (singular cantica) – Inferno (Hell), Purgatorio (Purgatory), and Paradiso (Paradise) – each consisting of 33 cantos (Italian plural canti). An initial canto, serving as an introduction to the poem and generally considered to be part of the first cantica, brings the total number of cantos to 100. It is generally accepted, however, that the first two cantos serve as a unitary prologue to the entire epic, and that the opening two cantos of each cantica serve as prologues to each of the three cantiche.

The number three is prominent in the work, represented in part by the number of cantiche and their lengths. Additionally, the verse scheme used, terza rima, is hendecasyllabic (lines of eleven syllables), with the lines composing tercets according to the rhyme scheme ABA BCB CDC DED ... The total number of syllables in each tercet is thus 33, the same as the number of cantos in each cantica.

Written in the first person, the poem tells of Dante's journey through the three realms of the dead, lasting from the night before Good Friday to the Wednesday after Easter in the spring of 1300. The Roman poet Virgil guides him through Hell and Purgatory; Beatrice, Dante's ideal woman, guides him through Heaven. Beatrice was a Florentine woman he had met in childhood and admired from afar in the mode of the then-fashionable courtly love tradition, which is highlighted in Dante's earlier work La Vita Nuova. The Cistercian abbot Bernard of Clairvaux guides Dante through the last three cantos.

Dante's guides in the poem

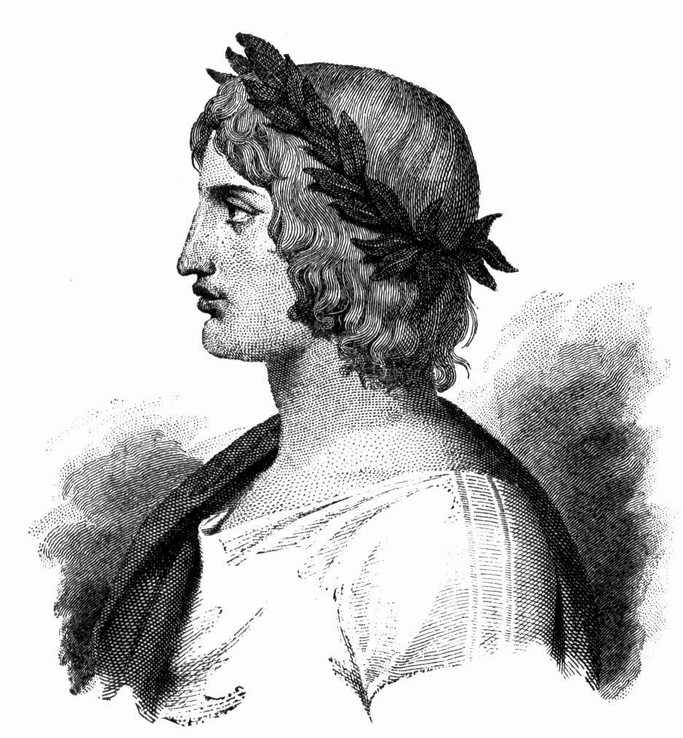
Virgil

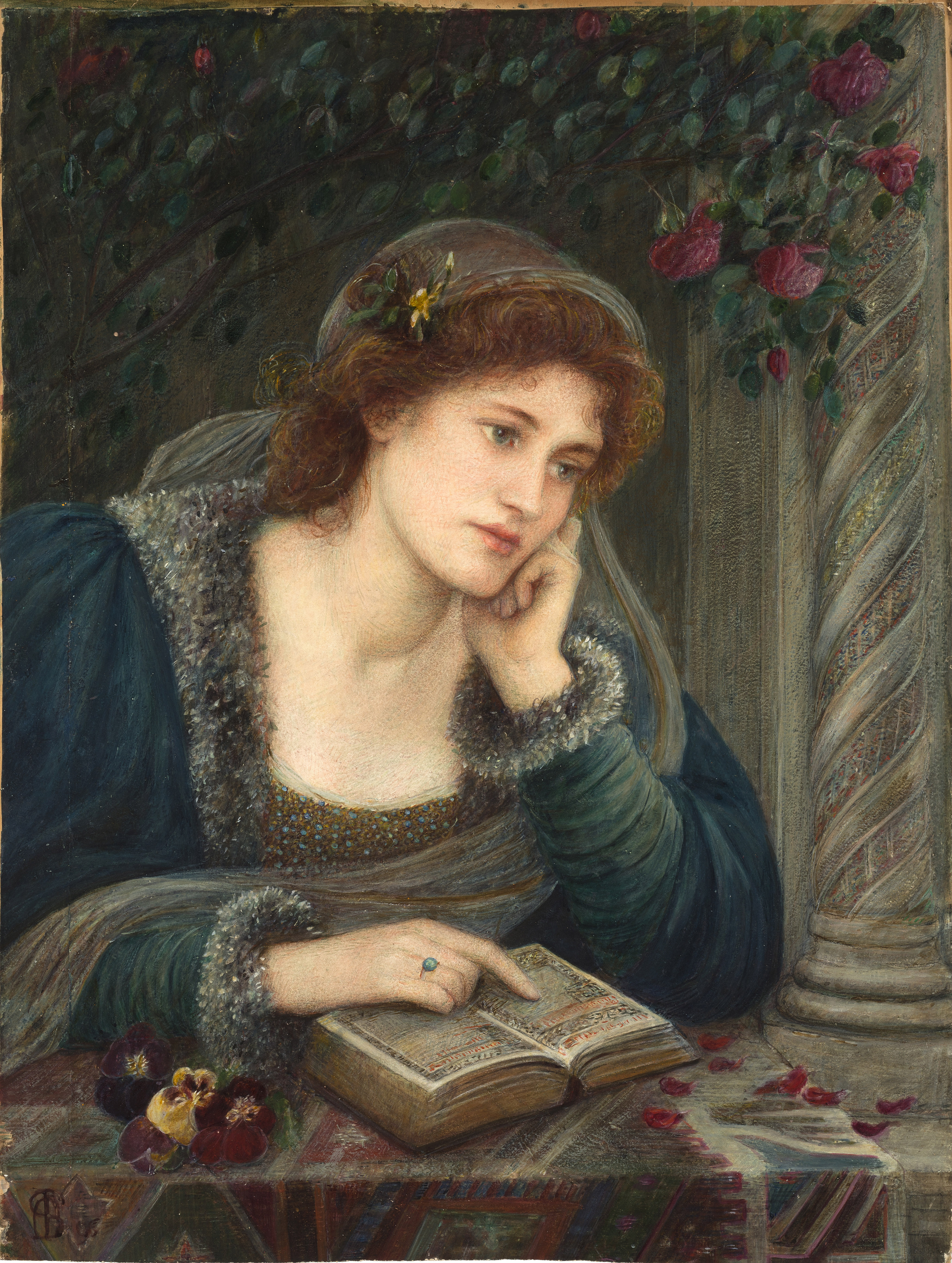
Beatrice

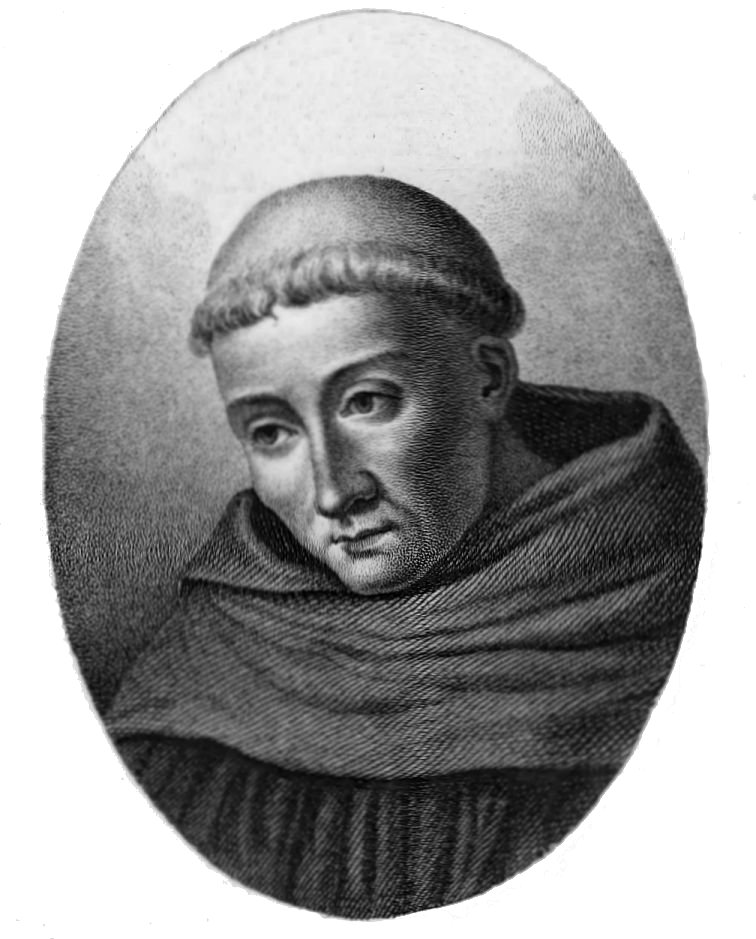
Saint Bernard

The structure of the three realms follows a common numerical pattern of 9 plus 1, for a total of 10. There are nine circles of the Inferno, followed by Lucifer contained at its bottom; nine rings of Mount Purgatory, followed by the Garden of Eden crowning its summit; and the nine celestial bodies of Paradiso, followed by the Empyrean containing the very essence of God. Within each group of nine, seven elements correspond to a specific moral scheme, subdivided into three subcategories, while two others of greater particularity are added to total nine. For example, the seven deadly sins that are cleansed in Purgatory are joined by special realms for the late repentant and the excommunicated. The core seven sins within Purgatory correspond to a moral scheme of love perverted, subdivided into three groups corresponding to excessive love (Lust, Gluttony, Greed), deficient love (Sloth), and malicious love (Wrath, Envy, Pride).

In central Italy's political struggle between Guelphs and Ghibellines, Dante was part of the Guelphs, who in general favoured the papacy over the Holy Roman Emperor. Florence's Guelphs split into factions around 1300 – the White Guelphs and the Black Guelphs. While both had once supported a strong papacy, the White Guelphs later supported greater imperial power in Italy. Dante's desire for a strong emperor to restore order to Italy and Europe is a constant theme throughout the poem.

Dante was among the White Guelphs who were exiled in 1302 by the Lord-Mayor Cante de' Gabrielli di Gubbio, after troops under Charles of Valois entered the city, at the request of Pope Boniface VIII, who supported the Black Guelphs. This exile, which lasted the rest of Dante's life, shows its influence in many parts of the Comedy, from prophecies of Dante's exile to Dante's views of politics, to the eternal damnation of some of his opponents.

The last word in each of the three cantiche is stelle ("stars").

=== Inferno ===
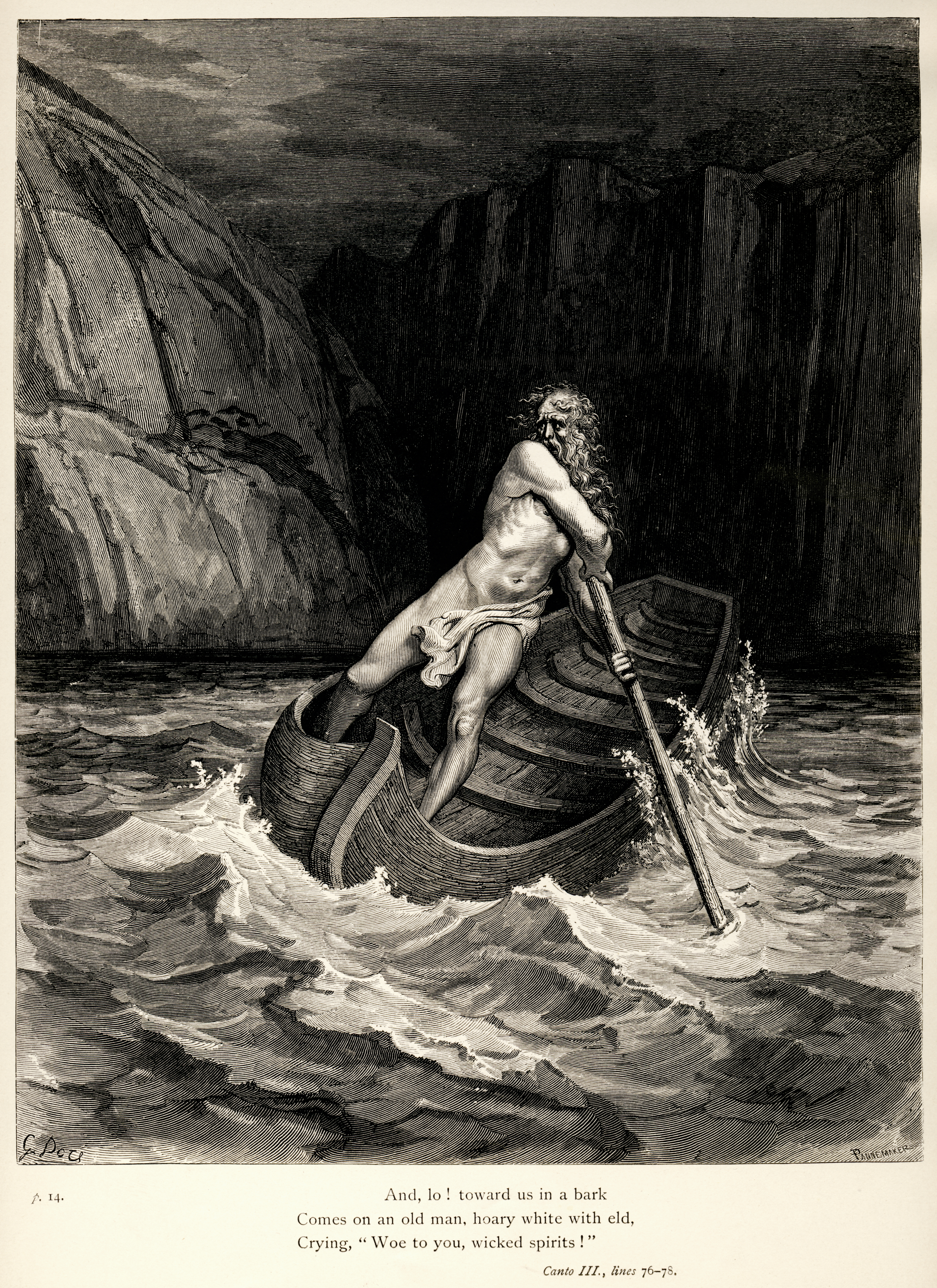
Gustave Doré's engravings illustrated the Divine Comedy (1861–1868); here Charon comes to ferry souls across the river Acheron to Hell.

The poem begins on the night before Good Friday in the year 1300, "halfway along our life's path" (Nel mezzo del cammin di nostra vita). Dante is thirty-five years old, half of the biblical lifespan of seventy (Psalms 89:10, Vulgate), lost in a dark wood (understood as sin), assailed by beasts (a lion, a leopard, and a she-wolf) he cannot evade and unable to find the "straight way" (diritta via) to salvation (symbolised by the sun behind the mountain). Conscious that he is ruining himself and that he is falling into a "low place" (basso loco) where the sun is silent ('l sol tace), Dante is at last rescued by Virgil, and the two of them begin their journey to the underworld. Each sin's punishment in Inferno is a contrapasso, a symbolic instance of poetic justice; for example, in Canto XX, fortune-tellers and soothsayers must walk with their heads on backwards, unable to see what is ahead, because that was what they had tried to do in life:

they had their faces twisted toward their haunches
and found it necessary to walk backward,
because they could not see ahead of them.
... and since he wanted so to see ahead,
he looks behind and walks a backward path.

Allegorically, the Inferno represents the Christian soul seeing sin for what it really is, and the three beasts represent three types of sin: the self-indulgent, the violent, and the malicious. These three types of sin also provide the three main divisions of Dante's Hell: Upper Hell, outside the city of Dis, for the four sins of indulgence (lust, gluttony, avarice, anger); Circle 7 for the sins of violence against one's neighbour, against oneself, and against God, art, and nature; and Circles 8 and 9 for the sins of fraud and treachery. Added to these are two dissimilar, spiritual categories: Limbo, in Circle 1, contains the virtuous pagans who were not sinful but were ignorant of Christ, and Circle 6 contains the heretics who contradicted the doctrine and confused the spirit of Christ.

=== Purgatorio ===
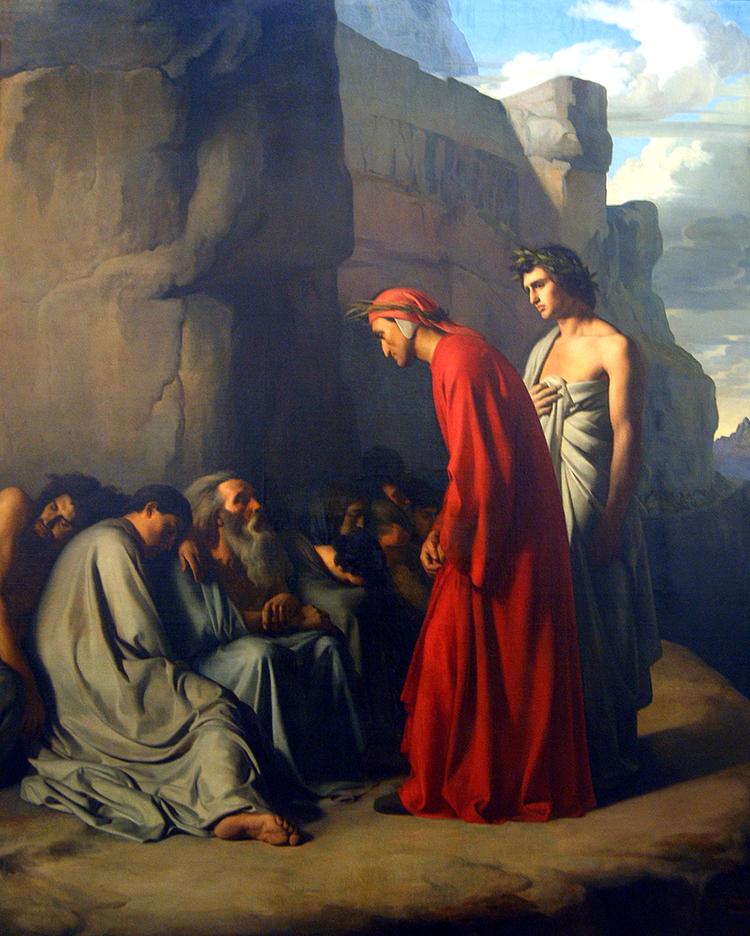
Dante, accompanied by Virgil, consoles the souls of the envious, from the Canto III of Purgatorio

Having survived the depths of Hell, Dante and Virgil ascend out of the undergloom to the Mountain of Purgatory on the far side of the world. The Mountain is on an island, the only land in the Southern Hemisphere, created by the displacement of rock which resulted when Satan's fall created Hell (which Dante portrays as existing underneath Jerusalem). The mountain has seven terraces, corresponding to the seven deadly sins or "seven roots of sinfulness". The classification of sin here is more psychological than that of the Inferno, being based on motives, rather than actions. It is also drawn primarily from Christian theology, rather than from classical sources. However, Dante's illustrative examples of sin and virtue draw on classical sources as well as on the Bible and on contemporary events.

Love, a theme throughout the Divine Comedy, is particularly important for the framing of sin on the Mountain of Purgatory. While the love that flows from God is pure, it can become sinful as it flows through humanity. Humans can sin by using love towards improper or malicious ends (Wrath, Envy, Pride), or using it to proper ends but with love that is either not strong enough (Sloth) or love that is too strong (Lust, Gluttony, Greed). Below the seven purges of the soul is the Ante-Purgatory, containing the Excommunicated from the church and the Late repentant who died, often violently, before receiving rites. Thus the total comes to nine, with the addition of the Garden of Eden at the summit, equalling ten.

Allegorically, the Purgatorio represents the Christian life. Christian souls arrive escorted by an angel, singing In exitu Israel de Aegypto. In his letter to Cangrande (the authenticity of which is disputed), Dante explains that this reference to Israel leaving Egypt refers both to the redemption of Christ and to "the conversion of the soul from the sorrow and misery of sin to the state of grace." Appropriately, therefore, it is Easter Sunday when Dante and Virgil arrive.

The Purgatorio demonstrates the medieval knowledge of a spherical Earth. During the poem, Dante discusses the different stars visible in the Southern Hemisphere, the altered position of the Sun, and the various time zones of the Earth. At this stage it is, Dante says, sunset at Jerusalem, midnight on the River Ganges, and sunrise in Purgatory.

=== Paradiso ===
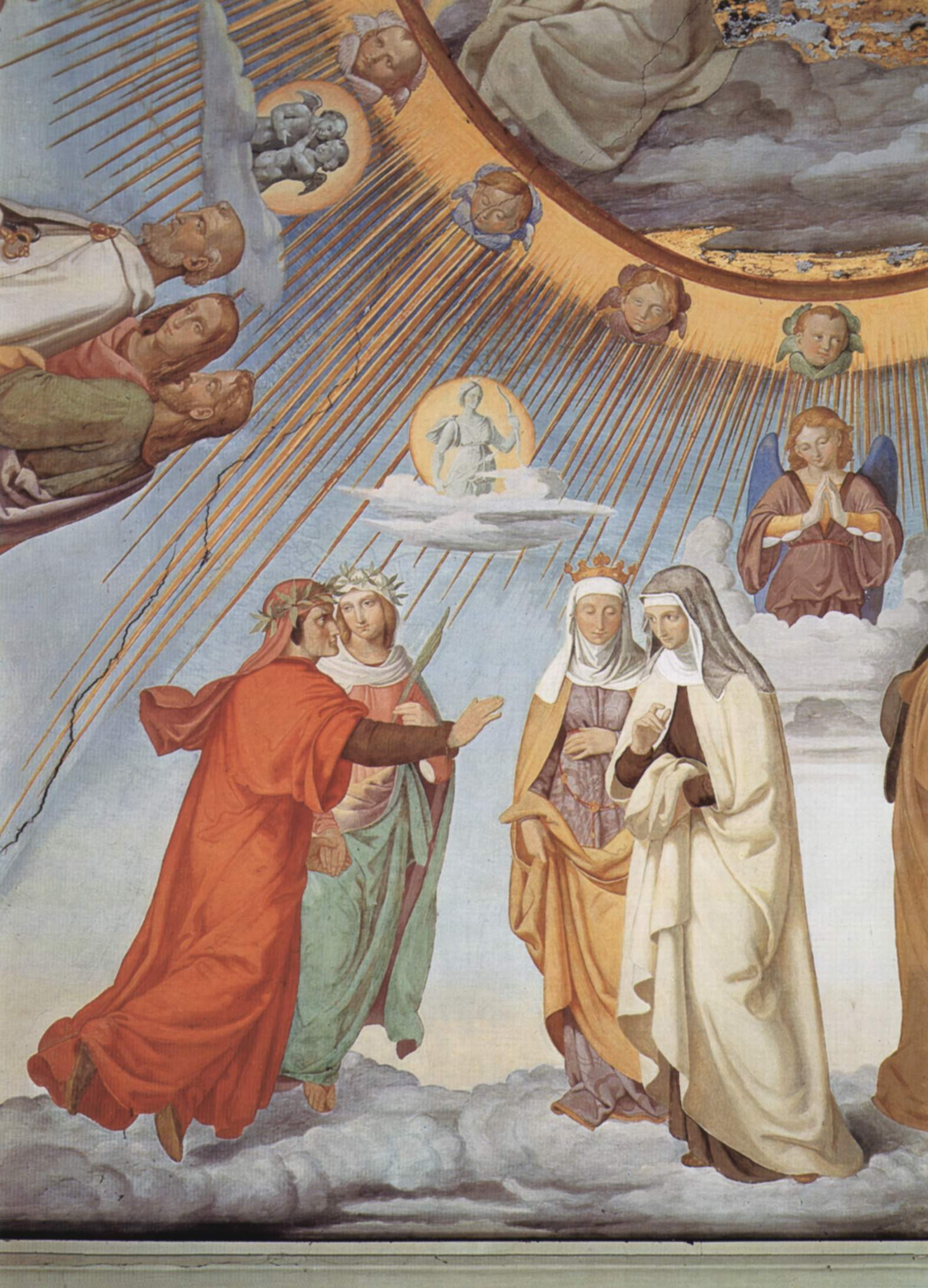
Paradiso, Canto III: Dante and Beatrice speak to Piccarda and Constance of Sicily, in a fresco by Philipp Veit.

After an initial ascension, Beatrice guides Dante through the nine celestial spheres of Heaven. These are concentric and spherical, as in Aristotelian and Ptolemaic cosmology. While the structures of the Inferno and Purgatorio were based on different classifications of sin, the structure of the Paradiso is based on the four cardinal virtues and the three theological virtues.

The seven lowest spheres of Heaven deal solely with the cardinal virtues of Prudence, Fortitude, Justice and Temperance. The first three spheres involve a deficiency of one of the cardinal virtues – the Moon, containing the inconstant, whose vows to God waned as the moon and thus lack fortitude; Mercury, containing the ambitious, who were virtuous for glory and thus lacked justice; and Venus, containing the lovers, whose love was directed towards another than God and thus lacked temperance. The final four incidentally are positive examples of the cardinal virtues, all led on by the Sun, containing the prudent, whose wisdom lighted the way for the other virtues, to which the others are bound (constituting a category on its own). Mars contains the men of fortitude who died in the cause of Christianity; Jupiter contains the kings of justice; and Saturn contains the temperate, the monks. The seven subdivided into three are raised further by two more categories: the eighth sphere of the fixed stars that contain those who achieved the theological virtues of faith, hope, and love, and represent the Church Triumphant – the total perfection of humanity, cleansed of all the sins and carrying all the virtues of heaven; and the ninth circle, or Primum Mobile (corresponding to the geocentricism of medieval astronomy), which contains the angels, creatures never poisoned by original sin. Topping them all is the Empyrean, which contains the essence of God, completing the nine-fold division to ten.

Dante meets and converses with several great saints of the Church, including Thomas Aquinas, Bonaventure, Saint Peter, and St. John. Near the end, Beatrice departs and Bernard of Clairvaux takes over as the guide. The Paradiso is more theological in nature than the Inferno and the Purgatorio. However, Dante admits that the vision of heaven he receives is merely the one his human eyes permit him to see, and thus Dante's personal vision.

The Divine Comedy finishes with Dante seeing the Triune God. In a flash of understanding that he cannot express, Dante finally understands the mystery of Christ's divinity and humanity, and his soul becomes aligned with God's love:

But already my desire and my will
were being turned like a wheel, all at one speed,
by the Love which moves the sun and the other stars.

== History ==
=== Manuscripts ===
According to the Italian Dante Society, no original manuscript written by Dante has survived, although there are many manuscript copies from the 14th and 15th centuries – some 800 are listed on their site.

=== Early translations ===
Coluccio Salutati translated some quotations from the Comedy into Latin for his De fato et fortuna in 1396–1397. The first complete translation of the Comedy was made into Latin prose by Giovanni da Serravalle in 1416 for two English bishops, Robert Hallam and Nicholas Bubwith, and an Italian cardinal, Amedeo di Saluzzo. It was made during the Council of Constance. The first verse translation, into Latin hexameters, was made in 1427–1431 by Matteo Ronto.

The first translation of the Comedy into another vernacular was the prose translation into Castilian completed by Enrique de Villena in 1428. The first vernacular verse translation was that of Andreu Febrer into Catalan in 1429.

=== Early printed editions ===
The first printed edition was published in Foligno, Italy, by Johann Numeister and Evangelista Angelini da Trevi on 11 April 1472. Of the 300 copies printed, fourteen still survive. The original printing press is on display in the Oratorio della Nunziatella in Foligno.

Early printed editions
| Date | Title | Place | Publisher | Notes |
|---|---|---|---|---|
| 1472 | La Comedia di Dante Alleghieri | Foligno | Johann Numeister and Evangelista Angelini da Trevi | First printed edition (or editio princeps) |
| 1477 | La Commedia | Venice | Wendelin of Speyer | |
| 1481 | Comento di Christophoro Landino fiorentino sopra la Comedia di Dante Alighieri | Florence | Nicolaus Laurentii | With Cristoforo Landino's commentary in Italian, and some engraved illustrations by Baccio Baldini after designs by Sandro Botticelli |
| 1491 | Comento di Christophoro Landino fiorentino sopra la Comedia di Dante Alighieri | Venice | Pietro di Piasi | First fully illustrated edition |
| 1502 | Le terze rime di Dante | Venice | Aldus Manutius | |
| 1506 | Commedia di Dante insieme con uno diagolo circa el sito forma et misure dello inferno | Florence | Philippo di Giunta | |
| 1555 | La Divina Comedia di Dante | Venice | Gabriel Giolito | First use of "Divine" in title |

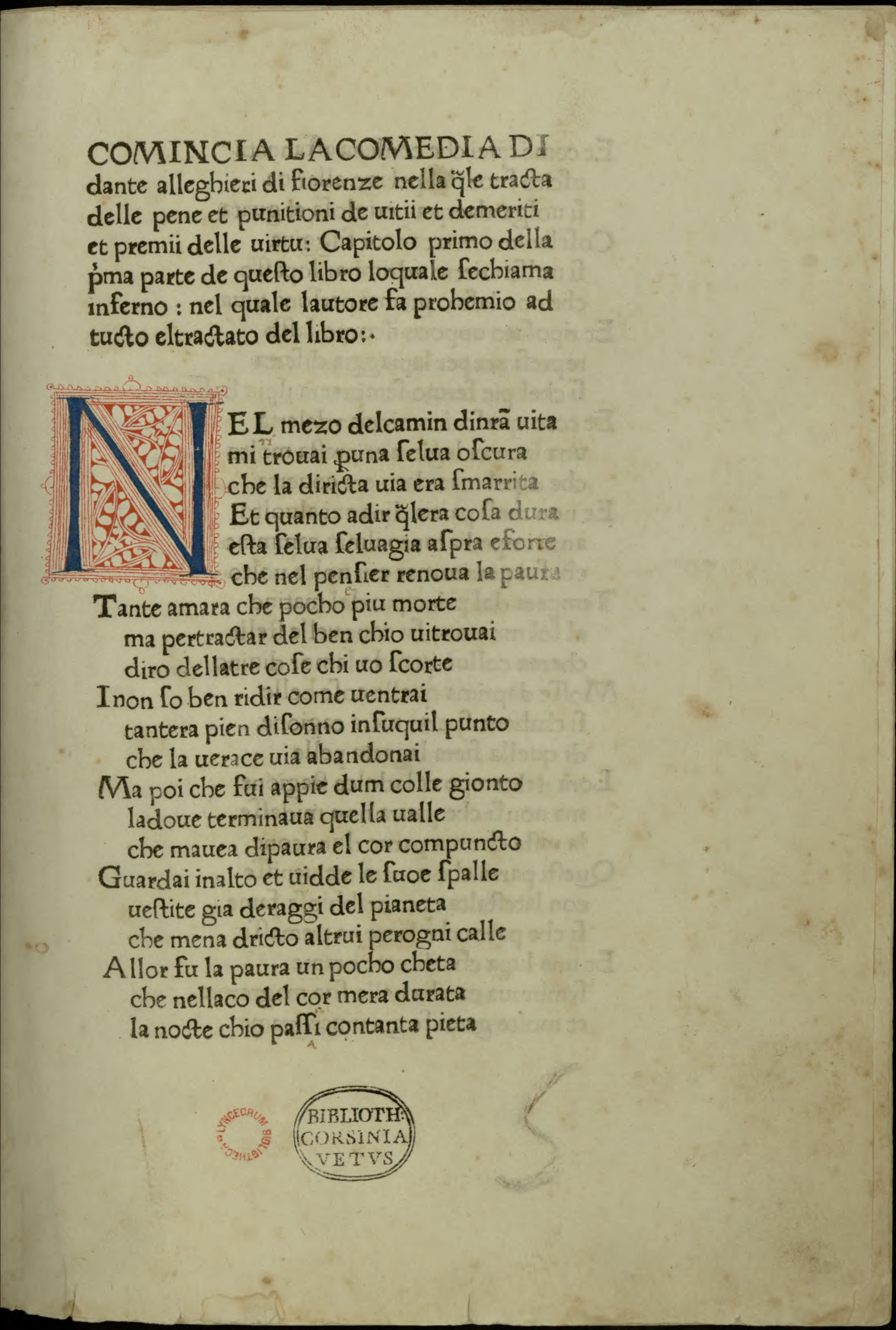
Title page of the first printed edition (Foligno, 11 April 1472)

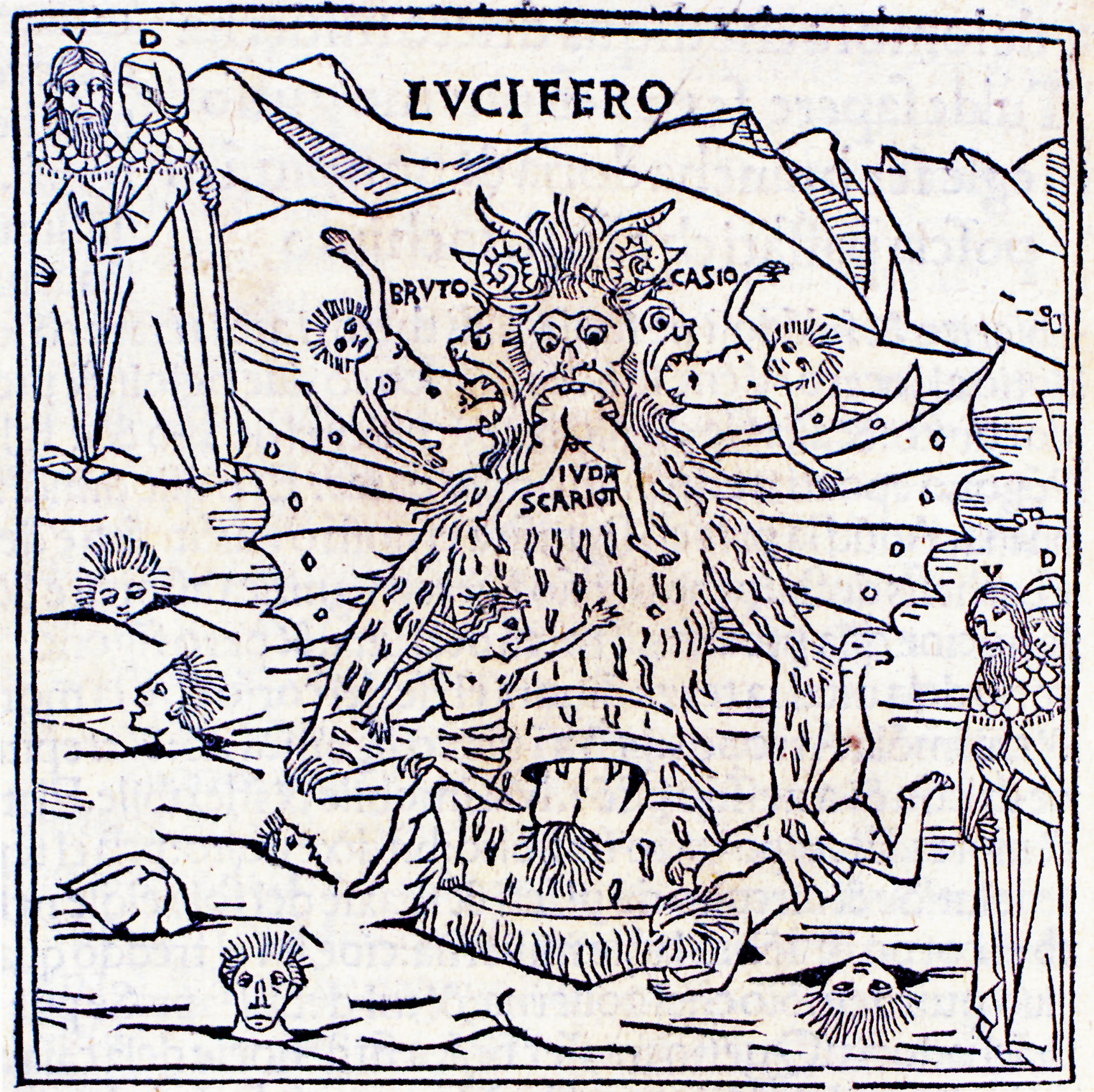
Illustration of Lucifer in the first fully illustrated print edition. Woodcut for Inferno, canto 34. Pietro di Piasi, Venice, 1491.

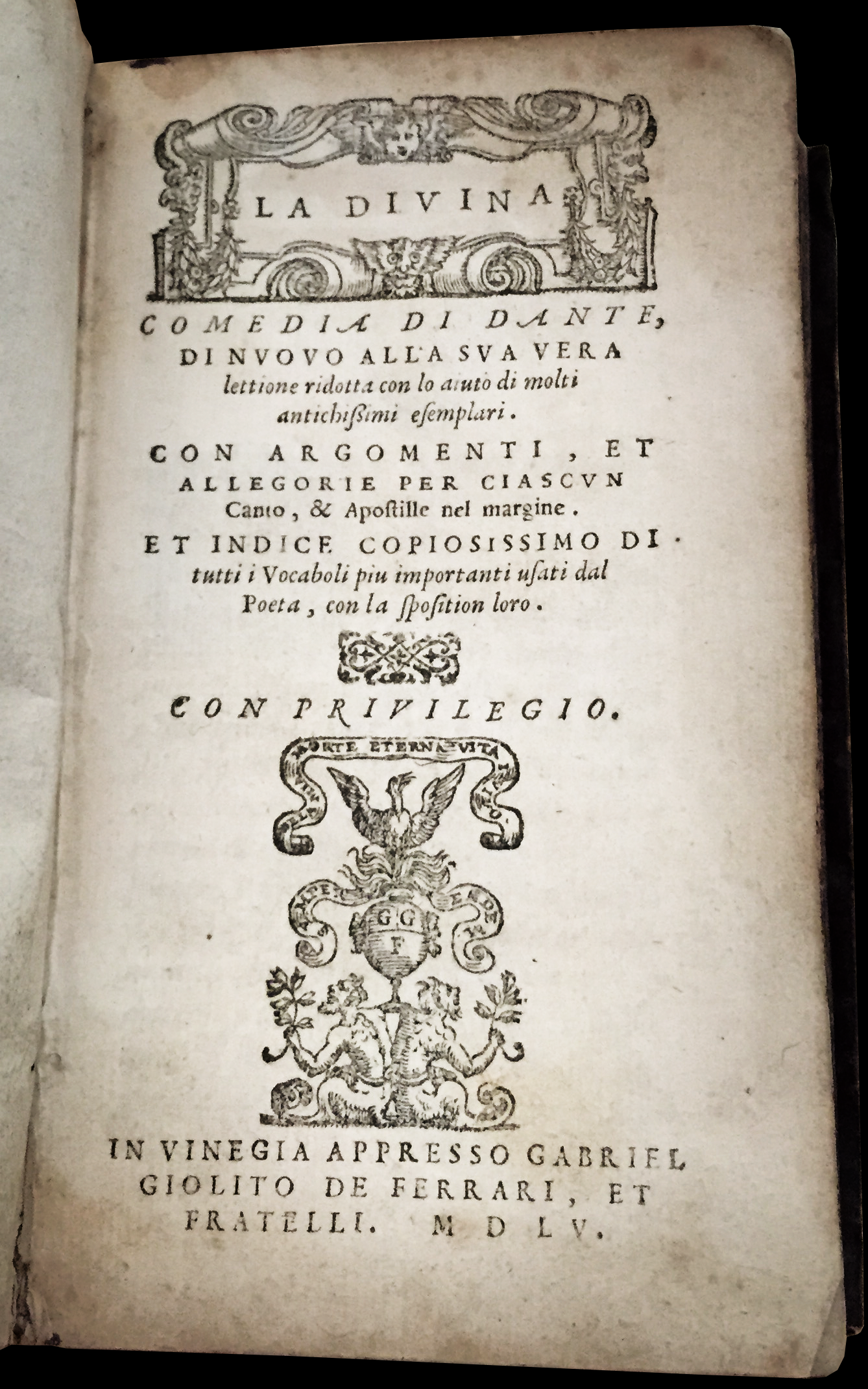
First edition to name the poem Divina Comedia, 1555

== Thematic concerns ==
The Divine Comedy can be described simply as an allegory: each canto, and the episodes therein, can contain many alternative meanings. Dante's allegory, however, is more complex, and, in explaining how to read the poem (see the Letter to Cangrande) he outlines other levels of meaning besides the allegory: the historical, the moral, the literal, and the anagogical (cf. the four senses of Scripture).

The structure of the poem is complex, with mathematical and numerological patterns distributed throughout the work, particularly threes and nines. The poem is often lauded for its particularly human qualities: Dante's skillful delineation of the characters he encounters in Hell, Purgatory, and Paradise; his bitter denunciations of Florentine and Italian politics; and his powerful poetic imagination. Dante's use of real characters, according to Dorothy Sayers in her introduction to her translation of the Inferno, allows Dante the freedom of not having to involve the reader in description, and allows him to "[make] room in his poem for the discussion of a great many subjects of the utmost importance, thus widening its range and increasing its variety."

Dante called the poem "Comedy" (the adjective "Divine" was added later, in the 16th century) because poems in the ancient world were classified as High ("Tragedy") or Low ("Comedy"). Low poems had happy endings and were written in everyday language, whereas High poems treated more serious matters and were written in an elevated style. Dante was one of the first in the Middle Ages to write of a serious subject, the Redemption of humanity, in the low and "vulgar" Italian language and not the Latin one might expect for such a serious topic. Boccaccio's account that an early version of the poem was begun by Dante in Latin is still controversial.

=== Scientific themes ===
Although the Divine Comedy is primarily a religious poem, discussing sin, virtue, and theology, Dante also discusses several elements of the science of his day (this mixture of science with poetry has received both praise and criticism over the centuries). The Purgatorio repeatedly refers to the implications of a spherical Earth, such as the different stars visible in the Southern Hemisphere, the altered position of the sun, and the various time zones of the Earth. For example, at sunset in Purgatory it is midnight at the Ebro, dawn in Jerusalem, and noon on the River Ganges:

Just as, there where its Maker shed His blood,
the sun shed its first rays, and Ebro lay
beneath high Libra, and the ninth hour's rays

were scorching Ganges' waves; so here, the sun
stood at the point of day's departure when
God's angel – happy – showed himself to us.

Dante travels through the centre of the Earth in the Inferno, and comments on the resulting change in the direction of gravity in Canto XXXIV (lines 76–120). A little earlier (XXXIII, 102–105), he queries the existence of wind in the frozen inner circle of hell, since it has no temperature differentials.

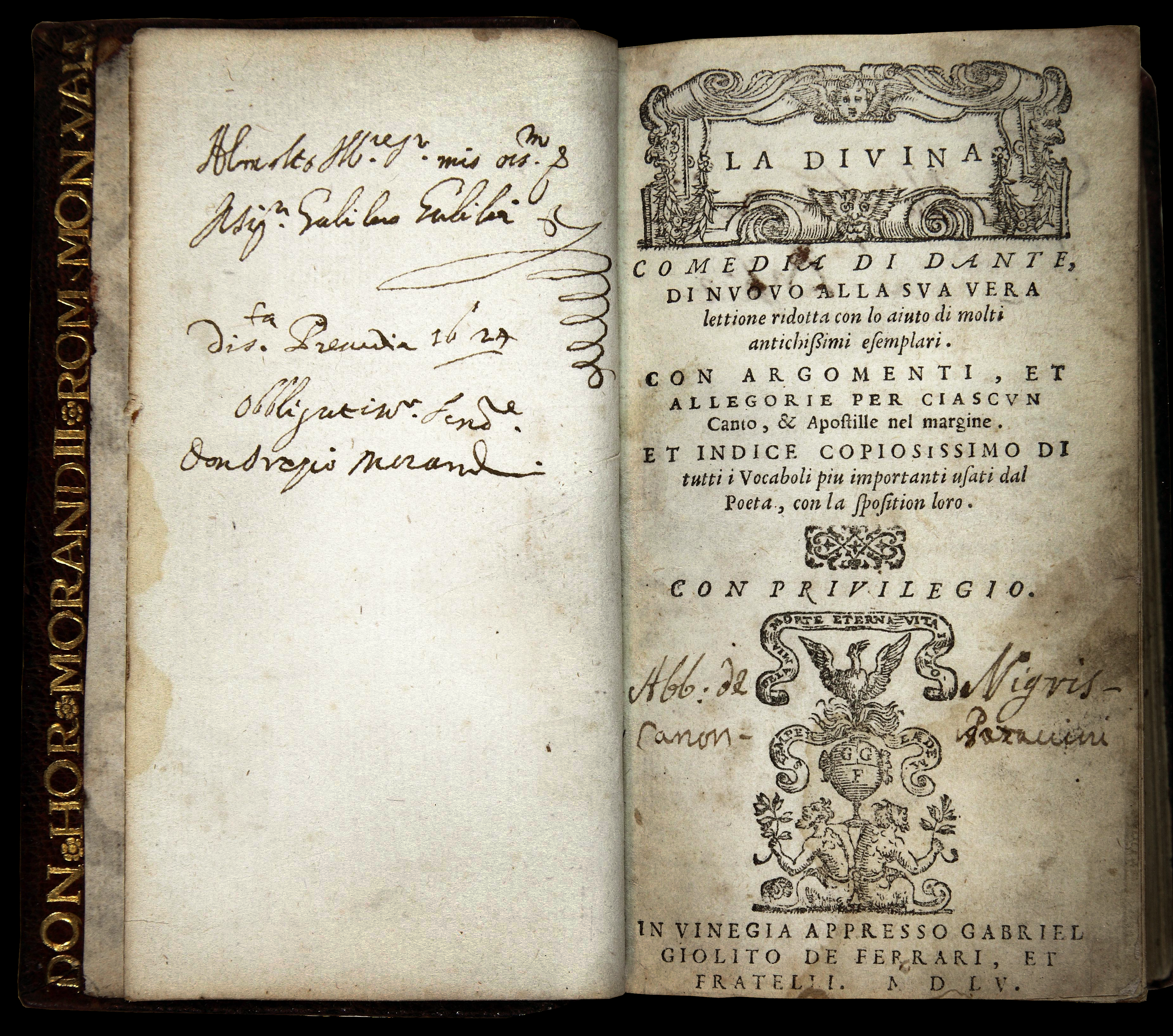
Galileo Galilei's copy of the first Giolito edition of the poem (1555)

Inevitably, given its setting, the Paradiso discusses astronomy extensively, but in the Ptolemaic sense. The Paradiso also discusses the importance of the experimental method in science, with a detailed example in lines 94–105 of Canto II:

Yet an experiment, were you to try it,
could free you from your cavil and the source
of your arts' course springs from experiment.
Taking three mirrors, place a pair of them
at equal distance from you; set the third
midway between those two, but farther back.
Then, turning toward them, at your back have placed
a light that kindles those three mirrors and
returns to you, reflected by them all.
Although the image in the farthest glass
will be of lesser size, there you will see
that it must match the brightness of the rest.
Paradiso, Canto II

A briefer example occurs in Canto XV of the Purgatorio (lines 16–21), where Dante points out that both theory and experiment confirm that the angle of incidence is equal to the angle of reflection. Other references to science in the Paradiso include descriptions of clockwork in Canto XXIV (lines 13–18), and Thales' theorem about triangles in Canto XIII (lines 101–102).

Galileo Galilei is known to have lectured on the Inferno, and it has been suggested that the poem may have influenced some of Galileo's own ideas regarding mechanics.

== Influences ==
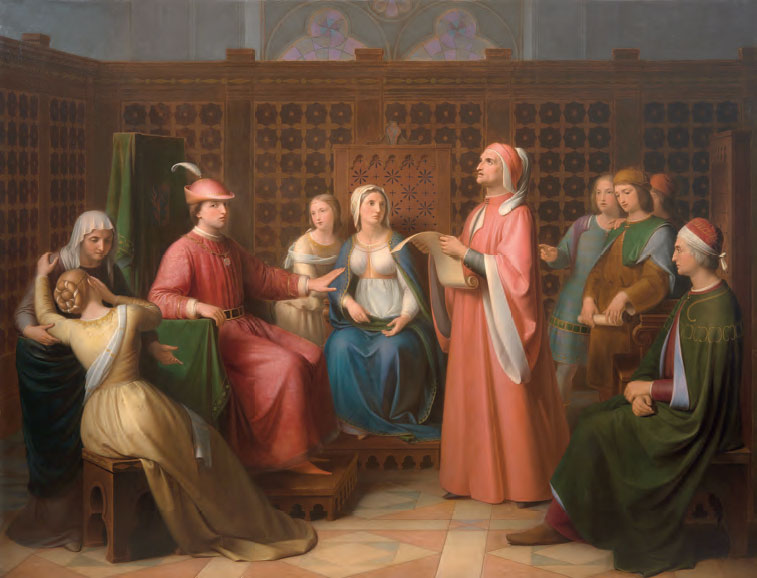
Dante reading the Divine Comedy at the court of Guido Novello; painting by Andrea Pierini, 1850 (Palazzo Pitti, Florence)

=== Classical ===
Without access to the works of Homer, Dante used Virgil, Lucan, Ovid, and Statius as the models for the style, history, and mythology of the Comedy. This is most obvious in the case of Virgil, who appears as a mentor character throughout the first two canticles and who has his epic, the Aeneid, praised with language Dante reserves elsewhere for Scripture. Ovid is given less explicit praise in the poem, but besides Virgil, Dante uses Ovid as a source more than any other poet, mostly through metaphors and fantastical episodes based on those in the Metamorphoses. Less influential than either of the two are Statius and Lucan, the latter of whom has only been given proper recognition as a source in the Divine Comedy in the twentieth century.

Besides Dante's fellow poets, the classical figure that most influenced the Comedy is Aristotle. Dante built up the philosophy of the Comedy with the works of Aristotle as a foundation, just as the scholastics used Aristotle as the basis for their thinking. Dante knew Aristotle directly from Latin translations of his works and indirectly from quotations in the works of Albertus Magnus. Dante even acknowledges Aristotle's influence explicitly in the poem, specifically when Virgil justifies the Inferno's structure by citing the Nicomachean Ethics. In the same canto, Virgil draws on Cicero's De Officiis to explain why sins of the intellect are worse than sins of violence, a key point that would be explored from canto XVIII to the end of the Inferno.

=== Christian ===
The Divine Comedy's language is often derived from the phraseology of the Vulgate. This was the only translation of the Bible Dante had access to, as it was one the vast majority of scribes were willing to copy during the Middle Ages. This includes five hundred or so direct quotes and references Dante derives from the Bible (or his memory of it). Dante also treats the Bible as a final authority on any matter, including on subjects scripture only approaches allegorically.

The Divine Comedy is also a product of Scholasticism, especially as expressed by St. Thomas Aquinas. This influence is most pronounced in the Paradiso, where the text's portrayals of God, the beatific vision, and substantial forms all align with scholastic doctrine. It is also in the Paradiso that Aquinas and fellow scholastic St. Bonaventure appear as characters, introducing Dante to all of Heaven's wisest souls. Consequently, the Divine Comedy has been called "the Summa in verse". Despite all this, there are issues on which Dante diverges from the scholastic doctrine, such as in his unbridled praise for poetry.

The Divine Comedy belongs to the genre of katabasis and was influenced by the fourth-century Apocalypse of Paul, which was an earlier work of katabasis.

=== Islamic ===
Dante lived in a Europe of substantial literary and philosophical contact with the Muslim world, encouraged by such factors as Averroism ("Averoìs, che'l gran comento feo" Commedia, Inferno, IV, 144, meaning "Averroes, who wrote the great comment") and the patronage of Alfonso X of Castile. Of the twelve wise men Dante meets in Canto X of the Paradiso, Thomas Aquinas and, even more so, Siger of Brabant were strongly influenced by Arabic commentators on Aristotle. Medieval Christian mysticism also shared the Neoplatonic influence of Sufis such as Ibn Arabi. Philosopher Frederick Copleston argued in 1950 that Dante's respectful treatment of Averroes, Avicenna, and Siger of Brabant indicates his acknowledgement of a "considerable debt" to Islamic philosophy.

In 1919, Miguel Asín Palacios, a Spanish scholar and a Catholic priest, published La Escatología musulmana en la Divina Comedia (Islamic Eschatology in the Divine Comedy), an account of parallels between early Islamic philosophy and the Divine Comedy. Palacios argued that Dante derived many features of and episodes about the hereafter from the spiritual writings of Ibn Arabi and from the Isra and Mi'raj, or night journey of Muhammad to heaven. The latter is described in the ahadith and the Kitab al Miraj (translated into Latin in 1264 or shortly before as Liber scalae Machometi, "The Book of Muhammad's Ladder"), and has significant similarities to the Paradiso, such as a sevenfold division of Paradise, although this is not unique to the Kitab al Miraj or Islamic cosmology.

Many scholars have not been satisfied that Dante was influenced by the Kitab al Miraj. The 20th-century Orientalist Francesco Gabrieli expressed scepticism regarding the claimed similarities, and the lack of evidence of a vehicle through which it could have been transmitted to Dante. The Italian philologist Maria Corti pointed out that, during his stay at the court of Alfonso X, Dante's mentor Brunetto Latini met Bonaventura de Siena, a Tuscan who had translated the Kitab al Miraj from Arabic into Latin. Corti speculates that Brunetto may have provided a copy of that work to Dante. René Guénon, a Sufi convert and scholar of Ibn Arabi, confirms in The Esoterism of Dante the theory of the Islamic influence (direct or indirect) on Dante. Palacios' theory that Dante was influenced by Ibn Arabi was satirised by the Turkish academic Orhan Pamuk in his novel The Black Book.

In addition to that, it has been claimed that Risālat al-Ghufrān ("The Epistle of Forgiveness"), a satirical work mixing Arabic poetry and prose written by Abu al-ʿAlaʾ al-Maʿarri around 1033 CE, had an influence on, or even inspired, Dante's Divine Comedy.

== Criticism and textual history ==
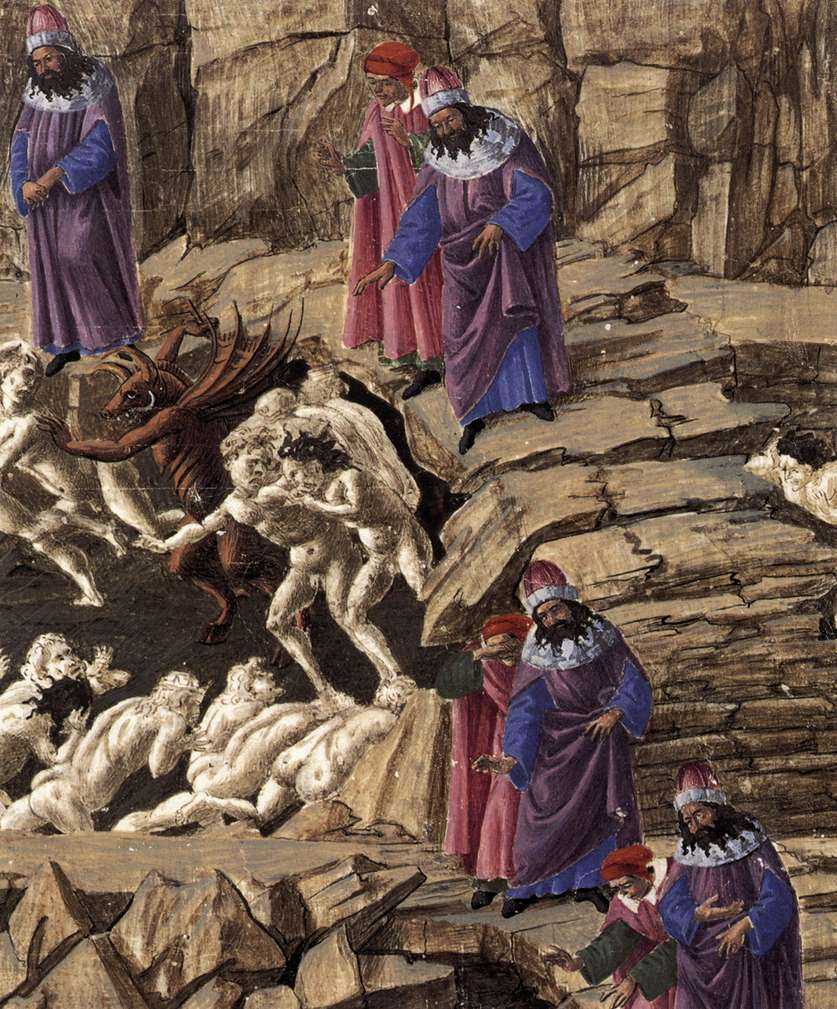
A detail from one of Sandro Botticelli's illustrations for Inferno, Canto XVIII, 1480s. Silverpoint on parchment, completed in pen and ink.

Critical reception of the Divine Comedy has varied considerably prior to its universal renown today. Although recognised as a masterpiece in the centuries immediately following its publication, the work largely fell into obscurity during the Enlightenment, with some notable exceptions: Vittorio Alfieri; Antoine de Rivarol, who translated the Inferno into French; and Giambattista Vico, who in the Scienza nuova and in the Giudizio su Dante inaugurated what would later become the romantic reappraisal of Dante, juxtaposing him to Homer.

The Comedy was "rediscovered" in the English-speaking world by William Blake – who illustrated several passages of the epic – and the Romantic writers of the 19th century. Later authors such as T. S. Eliot, Ezra Pound, Samuel Beckett, C. S. Lewis and James Joyce have drawn on it for inspiration. The poet Henry Wadsworth Longfellow was its first American translator, and modern poets, including Seamus Heaney, Robert Pinsky, John Ciardi, W. S. Merwin, and Stanley Lombardo, have also produced translations of all or parts of the book. In Russia, beyond Alexander Pushkin's translation of a few tercets, Osip Mandelstam's late poetry has been said to bear the mark of a "tormented meditation" on the Comedy. In 1934, Mandelstam gave a modern reading of the poem in his labyrinthine "Conversation on Dante". Erich Auerbach said Dante was the first writer to depict human beings as the products of a specific time, place and circumstance, as opposed to mythic archetypes or a collection of vices and virtues, concluding that this, along with the fully imagined world of the Divine Comedy, suggests that the Divine Comedy inaugurated literary realism and self-portraiture in modern fiction. In T. S. Eliot's estimation, "Dante and Shakespeare divide the world between them. There is no third." For Jorge Luis Borges the Divine Comedy was "the best book literature has achieved".

In the centuries since its publication, the Comedy has developed one of the most extensive critical traditions of any work of literature, unmatched by any other secular work of western literature; line-by-line commentaries have been written in languages across Europe, the Americas, and Asia. Significantly, the Comedy was among the first pieces of vernacular literature to receive serious critical attention. Prior to 1300, such detailed criticism was reserved for religious texts and works of classical literature.

The Comedy is considered one originator of the encyclopedic novel across multiple formulations of the concept. Edward Mendelson's coinage of the term contrasted Dante's initial ostracism with his later importance to Italian national identity, comparing this to the culture-building function of later encyclopedic authors like Shakespeare, Cervantes, or Melville.

=== English translations ===
The Divine Comedy has been translated into English more times than any other language, and new English translations of the Divine Comedy continue to be published regularly. Notable English translations of the complete poem include the following.

| Year | Translator(s) | Notes |
|---|---|---|
| 1805–1814 | Henry Francis Cary | An older translation, widely available online. |
| 1867 | Henry Wadsworth Longfellow | Unrhymed terzines. The first U.S. translation, raising American interest in the poem. It is still widely available, including online. |
| 1891–1892 | Charles Eliot Norton | Prose translation used by Great Books of the Western World. Available online in three parts (Hell, Purgatory, Paradise) at Project Gutenberg. |
| 1933–1943 | Laurence Binyon | Terza rima. Translated with assistance from Ezra Pound. Used in The Portable Dante (Viking, 1947). |
| 1949–1962 | Dorothy L. Sayers | Translated for Penguin Classics, intended for a wider audience, and completed by Barbara Reynolds after Sayers's death. |
| 1969 | Thomas G. Bergin | Cast in blank verse with illustrations by Leonard Baskin. |
| 1954–1970 | John Ciardi | His Inferno was recorded and released by Folkways Records in 1954. |
| 1970–1991 | Charles S. Singleton | Literal prose version with extensive commentary; 6 vols. |
| 1981 | C. H. Sisson | Available in Oxford World's Classics. |
| 1980–1984 | Allen Mandelbaum | Available online at World of Dante and alongside Teodolinda Barolini's commentary at Digital Dante. |
| 1967–2002 | Mark Musa | An alternative Penguin Classics version. |
| 2000–2007 | Robert and Jean Hollander | Online as part of the Princeton Dante Project. Contains extensive scholarly footnotes. |
| 2002–2004 | Anthony M. Esolen | Modern Library Classics edition. |
| 2006–2007 | Robin Kirkpatrick | A third Penguin Classics version, replacing Musa's. |
| 2010 | Burton Raffel | A Northwestern World Classics version. |
| 2013 | Clive James | A poetic version in quatrains. |
| 2018–2021 | Alasdair Gray | "a verse translation that is modern, lyrical, yet faithful to the original" — the New Statesman |
| 2013–2025 | Mary Jo Bang | A colloquial translation using free verse. |

A number of other translators, such as Robert Pinsky, have translated the Inferno only.

== In popular culture ==
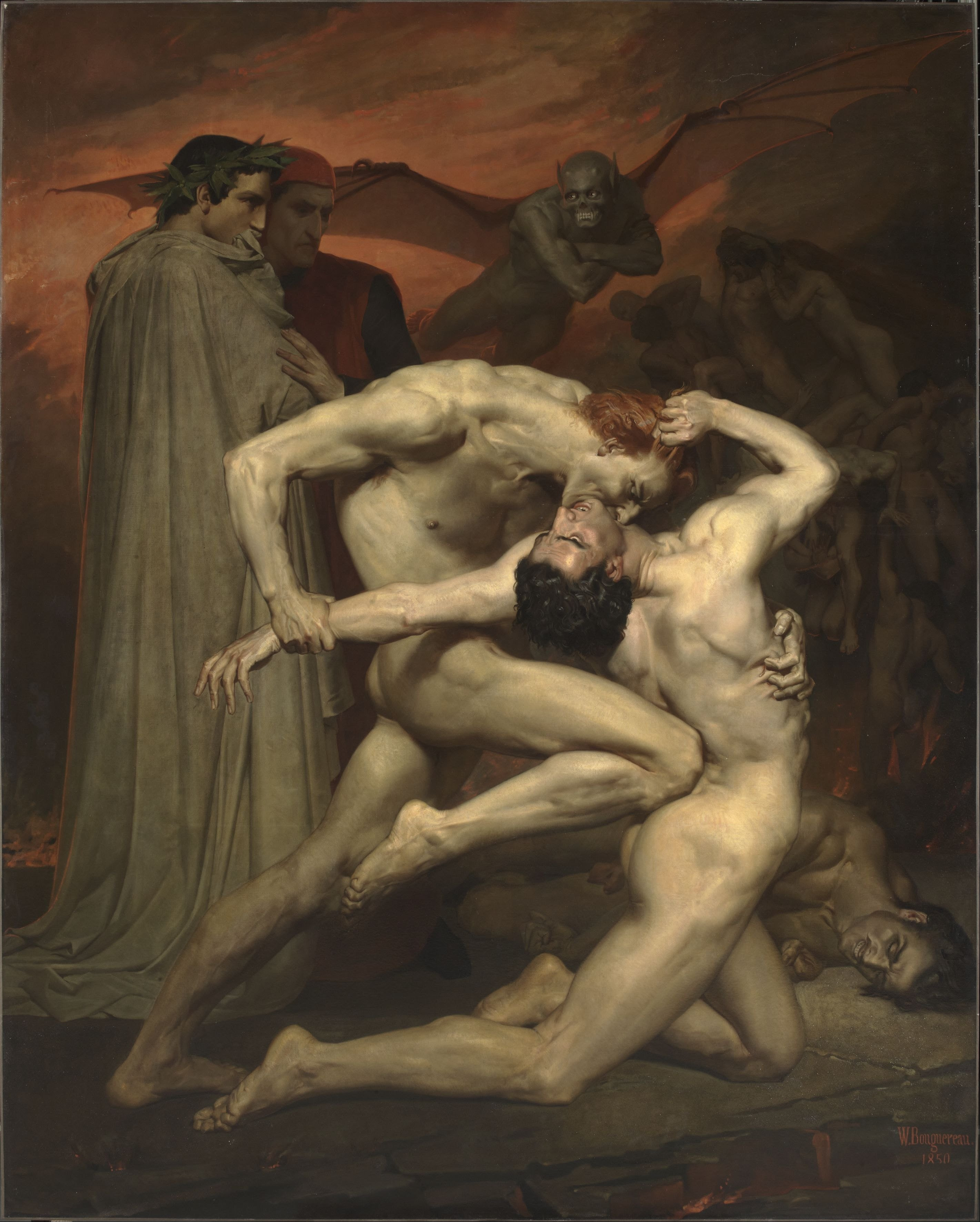
Dante and Virgil, a painting by William-Adolphe Bouguereau (1850), which depicts Dante and Virgil in the eighth circle of Hell, observing two damned souls in eternal combat

The Divine Comedy has been a source of inspiration for countless artists for almost seven centuries. There are many references to Dante's work in literature. In music, Franz Liszt was one of many composers to write works based on the Divine Comedy. Federico Bardazzi released in 2015 La musica della Commedia (Classic Voice – Antiqua) including all the musical pieces mentioned in the Divine Comedy. In contemporary music, Hozier's 2023 album Unreal Unearth also draws inspiration from Dante's epic. In sculpture, the work of Auguste Rodin includes themes from Dante. Sculptor Timothy Schmalz created a series of 100 sculptures, one for each canto, on the 700th anniversary of the date of Dante's death, and many visual artists have illustrated Dante's work, as shown by the examples above. There have also been many references to the Divine Comedy in cinema, television, comics and video games.

== See also ==
- Allegory in the Middle Ages
- Dream vision
- List of cultural references in Divine Comedy
- Seven Heavens
- Theological fiction
- Risalat al-Ghufran

== Citations ==
=== Bibliography ===
- Eiss, Harry (2017). Seeking God in the Works of T. S. Eliot and Michelangelo. New Castle upon Tyne: Cambridge Scholars. ISBN 978-1-4438-4390-4.
- Shaw, Prue (2014). Reading Dante: From Here to Eternity. New York: Liveright Publishing. ISBN 978-1-63149-006-4.
- Trone, George Andrew (2000). "Exile". In Lansing, Richard (ed.). The Dante Encyclopedia. London and New York: Routledge. ISBN 978-0-415-87611-7.
