= The Luzumiyat =

Poetry collection by Al-Ma'arri

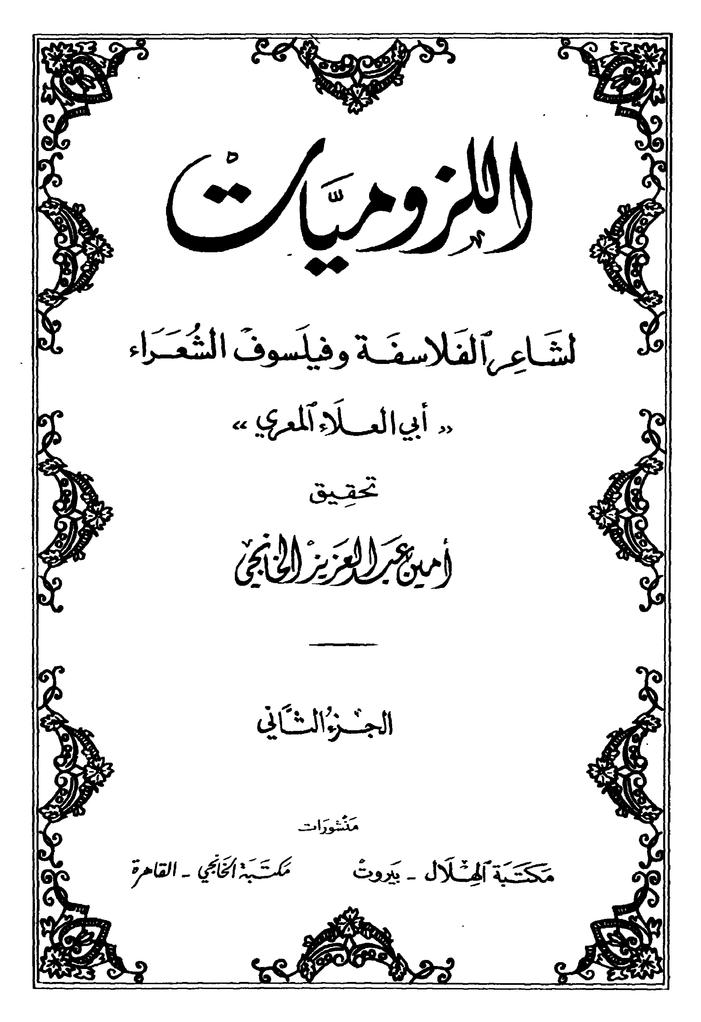
- Title page of a modern edition of the Luzumiyat.
- Author: Abū al-ʿAlāʾ al-Maʿarrī
- Original title: اللزوميات / لُزوم ما لا يلزم
- Translator: Ameen Fares Rihani (one translation)
- Language: Arabic
- Genre: Classical Arabic poetry, philosophical poems
- Publisher: J. T. White (for selected‐edition)
- Publication date: (original composition period: 10th–11th century)
- Publication place: Abbasid Caliphate / Islamic Golden Age Syria
- English publication date: 1918 (selected edition)
- Media type: Print (poetry collection)
- Pages: 119 (in the 1918 edition)
- Preceded by: Saqt az-Zand

The Luzumiyat (Arabic: اللزوميات) is the second collection of poetry by al-Ma'arri, comprising nearly 1600 short poems organised in alphabetical order and observing a novel double-consonant rhyme scheme devised by the poet himself.

The work is also known as Luzūm mā lā yalzam (Arabic: لزوم ما لا يلزم) which is variously translated as Unnecessary Necessity, The Self-Imposed Compulsion or "committing oneself to what is not obligatory"; this title is a reference to the difficult, 'unnecessary', rhyme scheme which al-Ma'arri applied to his work. This self-imposed technical challenge was a parallel to other constraints he adopted in his own life, including veganism and virtual social isolation. The poems were written over a period of many years and bear no individual titles. They were circulated by Al-Ma'arri under the title Luzumiyat during his lifetime. The poems are known chiefly for the ideas they contain, written in an ironic and, at times, cynical tone. Unlike traditional qasidas, they focus on doubt, uncertainty, sin, death, and the afterlife.

== Style ==
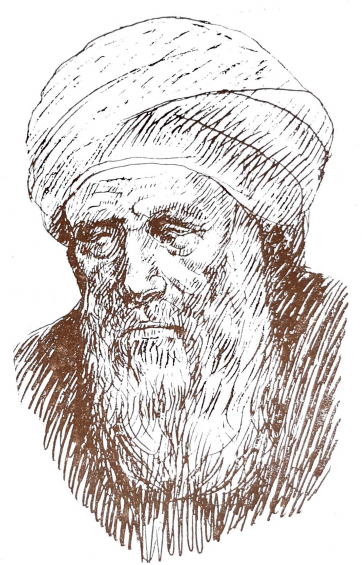
A depiction of Al-Maʿarri by Khalil Gibran

The Luzumiyat are perhaps the most expressive of al-Ma'arri's works, sharing a human vision not in a systematic philosophy but in poetic fragments. The language is for the most part distinctively erudite, including legal, medical, scientific and philosophical terms as well as many rarely-used words, but also includes proverbs and casual speech. Abu Zakaria al-Tabrizi said about him: "I don't know that the Arabs uttered any word without al-Ma'ari knowing it." Taha Hussein said of his work "There is no other scholar of language.... who achieved what Abu al-Ala'a [al-Ma'arri] did. There was scarcely a single expression in the language that he did not use in poetry or in prose, and I do not think any other writer or poet so well commanded the matter of the Arabic language, measured it and deployed it to best use, with such accuracy and sincerity as Abu al-Ala'a did".

The most striking aspect of Al-Ma'arri's style is his extraordinary command of grammar and morphology which mark him out as a master of the Arabic language. These stylistic elements are means by which the poet imparts the quality of complexity to his readers, as he points the way towards unconventional ideas while leaving readers aesthetic and intellectual space to come to their own conclusions.

Not all critics have taken such a positive view of the work, which has also been characterised as "taṣannuʿ" (Arabic: تصنع) (mannerism, affectation or hypocrisy) and "almost devoid of artistic beauty or novelty."

== Ideas ==
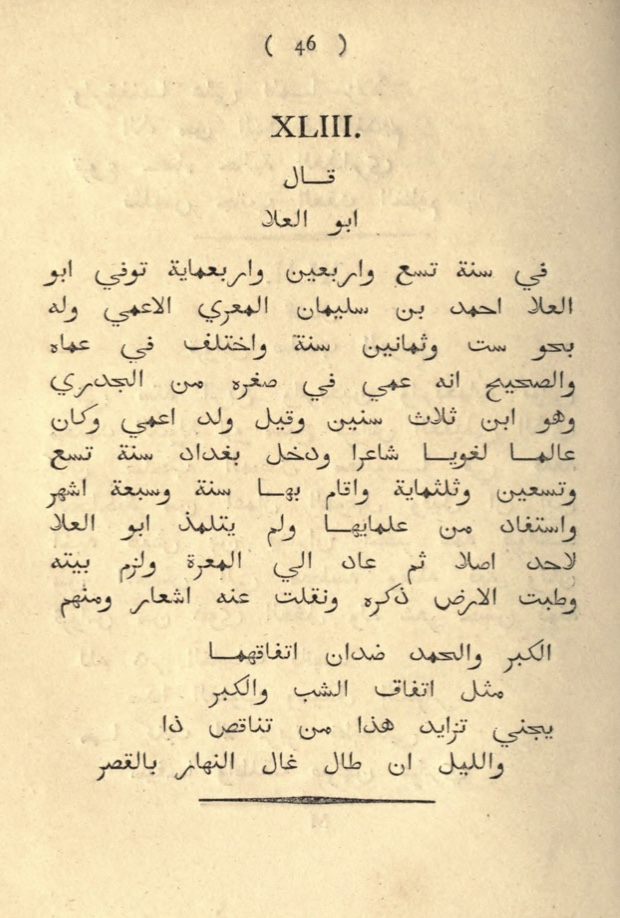
Carlyle's introduction to Al-Ma'arri and a quatrain from the Luzumiyat.

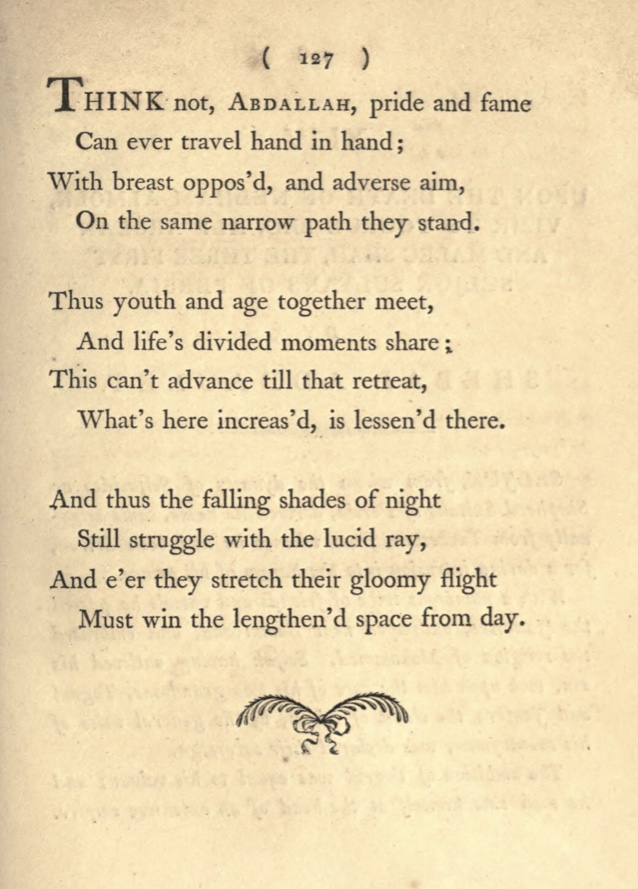
Carlyle's free translation of a quatrain from the Luzumiyat.

In his own introduction, al-Ma'arri described the work as a glorification of God, an admonition for the forgetful, an awakening of the negligent, and a warning against the world's derision of God. He also condemned the falsity of many poets, who lived comfortably but pretended, in their verse, to be facing the hardships of the desert or describing the beauties of an imagined beloved.

The poems are terse, each having six or seven lines on average. Each of these poems represents a brief and painful thought, or some paradox, or the overturning of a common idea. Exploits of rhyme and abstruse grammar contain a wry humour and moments of absurdity. Nothing is discussed at length; each poem contains ideas left incomplete or questions unresolved.

We find in them his view that religion is a superstition; wine, an unmitigated evil; virtue, its own reward; doubt, a way to truth; reason, the only guide to truth. The heterodox ideas alluded to in these poems include a respect for all living beings that informed al-Ma'arri's veganism, a doctrine described by some of his biographers as Brahminism. He also advocated the Indian custom of cremation and appeared to espouse in Jain belief in final annihilation. He also expressed his commitment to non-violence.

In addition to these unorthodox ideas, the Luzumiyat contained passages mocking not only Jews and Christians, but also fanatic Muslims. During the poet's life, the ideas in the collection do not seem to have led to any lack of regard for him. After his death however, pious Muslim scholars were inclined not to emphasise his thought.

== Western scholarship ==
The Dutch Arabist Jacobus Golius acquired a manuscript of the Luzumiyat, now held in the collections of the University of Leiden. He also published a few short extracts of al-Ma'arri's work in his 1656 edition of Erpinius's work on Arabic grammar.

The first English scholar to mention the Luzumiyat was J. D. Carlyle, who included and freely translated a quatrain from it in his 1796 Specimens of Arabic Poetry. The collection came to the general attention of European scholars through the work of Alfred von Kremer and his book Ueber die philosophischen Gedichte des Abul'alâ Ma'arry: Eine culturgeschichtliche Studie (Vienna, 1888) as well as his articles in the Zeitschrift der Deutschen Morgenländischen Gesellschaft (vols. xxix., xxx., xxxi. and xxxviii). The first major English language edition of the Luzumiyat was Ameen Rihani's The Luzumiyat of Abu'l-Ala: Selected from His Luzum ma la Yalzam and Suct uz-Zand, published in 1918.

== See also ==
- Saqt az-Zand
- Risalat Al-Ghufran
