= Risalat al-Ghufran =

Work of Arabic poetry by al-Ma'arri (c. 1033)

Risālat al-Ghufrān
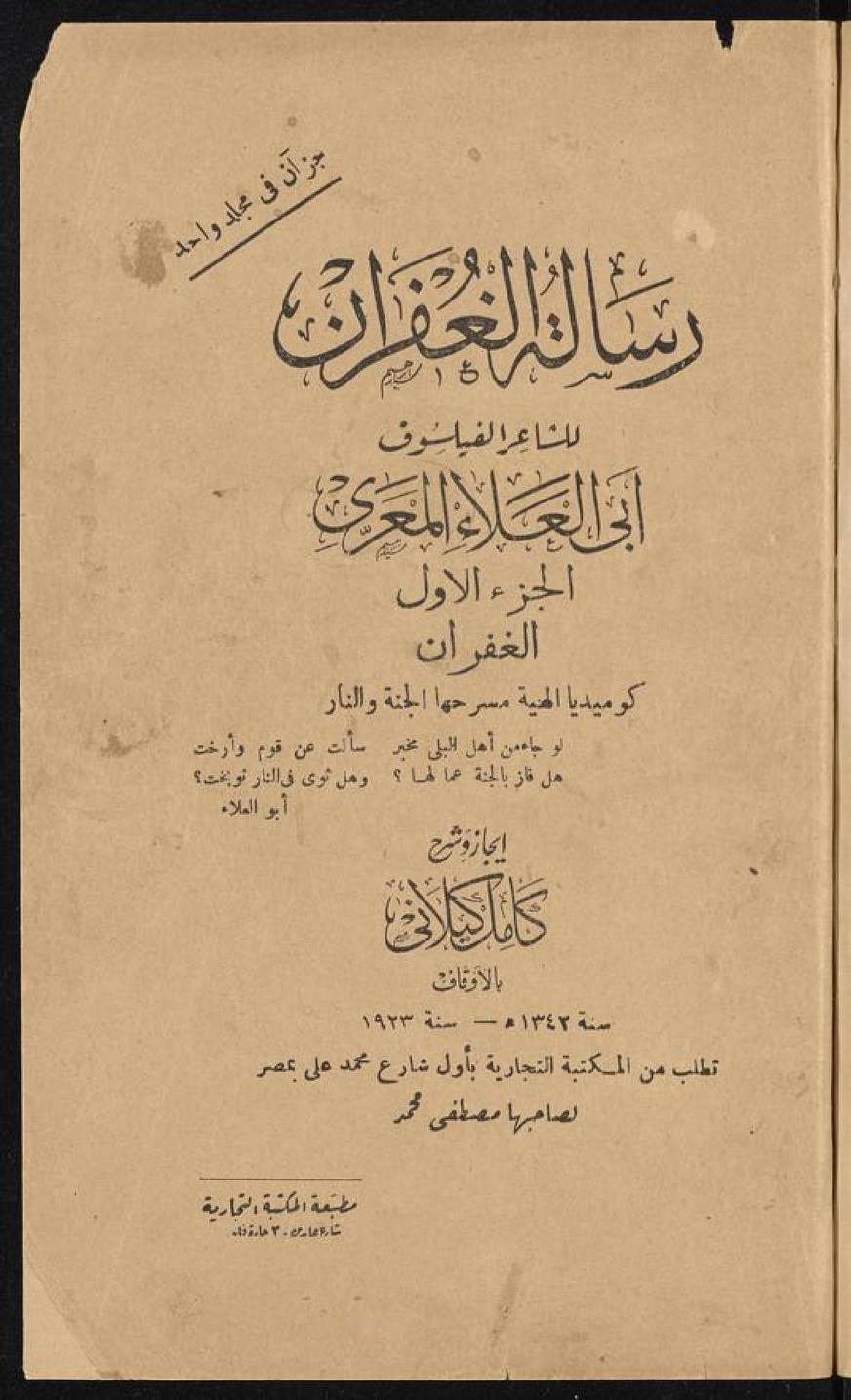
- Cover of Risālat al-Ghufrān
- Author: Abū al-ʿAlāʾ al-Maʿarrī
- Original title: رسالة الغفران
- Language: Arabic
- Genre: Satire, philosophical prose, afterlife vision
- Publication date: ~1033 CE
- Publication place: Abbasid Caliphate / Islamic Golden Age Syria
- Preceded by: The Luzumiyat

Risālat al-Ghufrān (Arabic: رسالة الغفران), or The Epistle of Forgiveness, is a satirical work of Arabic prose written by Abu al-'Ala' al-Ma'arri around 1033 CE. Literary scholars suggest that the Risālat al-Ghufrān influenced Dante Alighieri's Divine Comedy.

== Context ==
The work is a response to a letter sent to al-Ma'arri by the grammarian and man of letters, ʿAlī ibn Manṣūr al-Ḥalabī, known as Ibn al-Qāriḥ. In the words of Suzanne Pinckney Stetkevych:

In his epistle, Ibn al-Qāriḥ sanctimoniously flaunts his own learning and orthodoxy by impugning a number of poets and scholars for being zindīqs, or heretics. He thereby insinuates a challenge to the religious beliefs of al-Maʿarrī, who expressed in his poetry ideas considered heretical by many. Al-Maʿarrī takes up this challenge in his response, Risālat al-Ghufrān, by presenting a tour de force of his own extraordinary learning, and further by offering an imaginary and derisive depiction of Ibn al-Qāriḥ in the Islamic afterworld. There, Ibn al-Qāriḥ is repeatedly taken by surprise at the mercy of the Almighty, as he discovers in the heavenly garden poets and men of letters that he himself had condemned as unbelievers. Hence the title of al-Maʿarrī's epistle and its abiding message: that man should not presume to limit God's mercy.

The narrative details Ibn al-Qāriḥ's imagined journey through the afterlife, where he experiences resurrection and enters Paradise through the intercession of the Islamic prophet Muhammad. Inside Paradise, Ibn al-Qāriḥ engages in literary discussions with poets from the companions of the Prophet and other Muslim figures. The text restricts the presence of pre-Islamic poets in heaven to specific cases with religious justifications; he encounters al-A'sha, saved due to his poem praising the Prophet, and al-Hutay'ah, forgiven for his absolute truthfulness. Al-Ma'arri constructs this environment to satirize Ibn al-Qāriḥ's character, flooding the narrative with material pleasures that mirror the protagonist's own worldly desires. Throughout the vision, the narrative explicitly attributes the forgiveness of these figures and the unfolding of events to the boundless mercy and will of God, directly challenging the protagonist's rigid views on salvation. The protagonist later tours Hell to converse with condemned scholars and notorious poets. The journey also incorporates encounters with religious figures, notably questioning Adam regarding the authenticity of Arabic couplets traditionally attributed to him.

== Reception and interpretation ==
Historically, scholars divided in their reception of the text. Biographers such as al-Safadi (d. 1363) and al-Kala'i (d. 1236) cited the work primarily to demonstrate al-Ma'arri's literary and linguistic mastery. Conversely, Yaqut al-Hamawi (d. 1229) referenced the text in his biographical dictionary as evidence of the author's corrupted belief and heresy. Similarly, al-Dhahabi (d. 1348) characterized the text in his Tarikh al-Islam as an expression of heresy and disdain for religion.

Early Western orientalists interpreted the work as a deliberate mockery of Islamic eschatology. Reynold A. Nicholson (d. 1945) argued that al-Ma'arri depicted the believers' paradise as a grand salon inhabited by immortal bohemians. Miguel Asín Palacios (d. 1944) highlighted the text's hidden sarcasm, characterizing its tone as non-religious satire. The Encyclopaedia of Islam notes that these scholars viewed the narrative as a bold mixture of earnestness and jest that ridiculed afterlife doctrines.

Among modern Arab intellectuals, Taha Hussein (d. 1973) viewed the text's underlying themes and its portrayal of alleged heretics as a reflection of Abbasid-era skepticism.

Aisha Abd al-Rahman argued that earlier interpretations relied on incomplete readings, as these critics analyzed the text before the availability of a verified, comprehensive manuscript. She specifies that Orientalists and early Arab reviewers based their conclusions primarily on the second section of the book—al-Ma'arri's direct prose response containing accounts of heretics—rather than the overarching narrative structure. Regarding classical historians, Abd al-Rahman notes that figures like al-Dhahabi did not independently analyze the text, opting to replicate Yaqut's accusations of heresy. Modern scholarship supports this reassessment; historians have documented that classical detractors often relied on apocryphal and forged verses falsely attributed to al-Ma'arri to justify their charges of apostasy.

Abd al-Rahman identifies the core methodological error of previous critics as treating the work as a literal theological treatise. She categorizes the narrative as an artistic vision structured to reflect Ibn al-Qarih's psychology and material desires, utilizing religious eschatology as a literary device for personal satire rather than doctrinal mockery. Textual evidence within the narrative restricts the events and the forgiveness of specific figures directly to the will of God, contradicting the claims of religious disdain.

== Editions and translations ==
English translation of the book by Geert Jan van Gelder and Gregor Schoeler, published by NYU Press in the Library of Arabic Literature series.

- آمرزش؛ ترجمه عبدالمحمد آیتی (The Epistle of Forgiveness, translated by Abdul Mohammad Ayati) 2nd ed. (Tehran: Ashrafi Publications, 1357)
- رساله الغفران (The Epistle of Forgiveness) Translated by Haidar Shojaei. 1st ed. (Tehran: Majd Scientific and Cultural Association, 1379)
- Reynold A. Nicholson, 'The Risālatu'l-Ghufrān by Abū'l-ʿAlāʾ al-Maʿarrī, Summarized and Partially translated', Journal of the Royal Asiatic Society (1900), 637-720; (1902), 75-101, 337-62, 813-47.
- Risālat al-Ghufrān li-Abī al-ʿAlāʾ al-Maʿarrī, ed. by ʿĀʾishah ʿAbd al-Raḥmān [Bint al-Shāṭiʾ], 7th edn (Cairo: Dār al-Maʿārif, 1981) [first edn 1950].
- L'Épître du pardon, trans. by Vincent-Mansour Monteil (Paris: Gallimard, 1984).
- Abū al-ʿAlāʾ al-Maʿarrī, Paradies und Hölle: Die Jenseitsreise aus dem "Sendschreiben über die Vergebung", trans. by Gregor Schoeler (München: Beck, 2002).
- Abū l-ʿAlāʾ al-Maʿarrī, The Epistle of Forgiveness, Volume One: A Vision of Heaven and Hell Preceded by Ibn al-Qāriḥ's Epistle, ed. and trans. by Geert Jan van Gelder and Gregor Schoeler (New York University Press, 2013).
- Abū l-ʿAlāʾ al-Maʿarrī, The Epistle of Forgiveness, Volume Two: Or, a Pardon to Enter the Garden: Hypocrites, Heretics, and Other Sinners, ed. and trans. by Geert Jan Van Gelder and Gregor Schoeler (New York University Press 2014).
- Suzanne Pinckney Stetkevych, 'The Snake in the Tree in Abu al-ʿAlaʾ al-Maʿarri's Epistle of Forgiveness: Critical Essay and Translation', Journal of Arabic Literature, 45 (2014), 1-80.

== See also ==
- Arabic literature
- Saqt az-Zand
- Luzūmiyyāt
