= Al-Ma'arri =

Arab philosopher and poet (973–1057)

Abu al-'Ala' al-Ma'arri أبو العلاء المعري
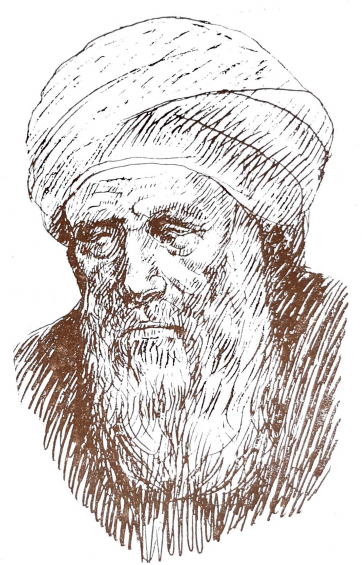
- al-Ma'arri by Kahlil Gibran
- Born: December 973; Ma'arrat al-Nu'man, Hamdanid Emirate of Aleppo
- Died: May 1057 (aged 83); Ma'arrat al-Nu'man, Mirdasid Emirate of Aleppo
- Other names: Abulola Moarrensis; Abulola

Philosophical work
- Era: Post-classical era: Islamic Golden Age
- Region: Middle Eastern philosophy: Arabic philosophy
- School: Pessimism; Rationalism
- Main interests: Poetry, skepticism; ethics; antinatalism
- Notable ideas: Veganism

Abu al-Ala al-Ma'arri (Arabic: أبو العلاء المعري; (Note: Full name: Arabic: أبو العلاء أحمد بن عبد الله بن سليمان التنوخي المعري, romanized: ʾAbū al-ʿAlāʾ Aḥmad ibn ʿAbd Allāh ibn Sulaymān al-Tanūkhī al-Maʿarrī) December 973 – May 1057), also known by his Latin name Abulola Moarrensis, was an Arab philosopher, poet, and writer from Ma'arrat al-Nu'man, Emirate of Aleppo (in present day Syria). Al-Ma'arri's religious beliefs and philosophical worldview have been the subject of extensive historical and modern academic debate. While his critical poetry led detractors and early Western scholars to characterize him as a deist, freethinker, or one of the "foremost atheists" of his time, (Note: Quotation of Nasser Rabbat) this categorization has been disputed by other scholars and complicated by Al-Ma'arri's seemingly contradictory writings.

Born in the city of al-Ma'arra (present-day Ma'arrat al-Nu'man, Syria) during the later Abbasid era, he became blind at a young age from smallpox but nonetheless studied in nearby Aleppo, then in Tripoli and Antioch. Producing popular poems in Baghdad, he refused to sell his texts. In 1010, he returned to Syria after his mother began declining in health, and continued writing, which gained him local respect.

Described by various scholars as a "pessimistic freethinker", al-Ma'arri was a controversial rationalist of his time, known for challenging superstition and dogmatism. His written works exhibit a fixation on the study of language and its historical development, known as philology. He was pessimistic about life, describing himself as "a double prisoner" of blindness and isolation. Because his poetry fiercely critiqued the religious practices of his era, several critics interpreted his work as an attack on Judaism, Christianity, Islam, and Zoroastrianism, with some historians asserting he became a deist. However, in response to contemporary accusations of heresy stemming from these poetic critiques, al-Ma'arri authored Zajr al-Nabeh. In this text, he explicitly denied holding atheistic or anti-Islamic beliefs, clarifying that his verses targeted the corruption, hypocrisy, and ignorance of religious figures rather than the core tenets of the faith itself.

He advocated social justice and lived a secluded, ascetic lifestyle. He was a vegan, known in his time as a moral vegetarian, entreating: "Do not desire as food the flesh of slaughtered animals / Or the white milk of mothers who intended its pure draught for their young." Al-Ma'arri held an antinatalist outlook, in line with his general pessimism, suggesting that children should not be born to spare them of the pains and suffering of life. Saqt az-Zand, Luzumiyat, and Risalat al-Ghufran are among his main works.

Consistent with his pervasive pessimism, al-Ma'arri harbored a deep skepticism regarding gender relations and advocated for the strict seclusion of women. As analyzed by the Egyptian scholar Taha Hussein, al-Ma'arri advised against teaching women to read or write to shelter them from societal corruption, and controversially argued that the Hajj pilgrimage should not be obligatory for them.

== Life ==
Abu al-'Ala' was born in December 973 in al-Ma'arra (present-day Ma'arrat al-Nu'man, Syria), southwest of Aleppo, whence his nisba ("al-Ma'arri"). At his time, the city was part of the Abbasid Caliphate, the third Islamic caliphate, during the Islamic Golden Age. He was a member of the Banu Sulayman, a notable family of Ma'arra, belonging to the larger Tanukh tribe. One of his ancestors was probably the first qadi of Ma'arra. The Tanukh tribe had formed part of the aristocracy in Syria for hundreds of years, and some members of the Banu Sulayman had also been noted as good poets. He lost his eyesight at the age of four due to smallpox. Later in his life, he regarded himself as "a double prisoner", which referred to both his blindness and the general isolation that he felt during his life.

He began his career as a poet at a young age, around 11 or 12 years old. He was educated at first in Ma'arra and Aleppo, then in Antioch and other Syrian cities. Among his teachers in Aleppo were companions from the circle of Ibn Khalawayh. This grammarian and Islamic scholar had died in 980 CE, when al-Ma'arri was still a child. Al-Ma'arri nevertheless laments the loss of Ibn Khalawayh in strong terms in a poem of his Risālat al-Ghufrān. Al-Qifti reports that when on his way to Tripoli, al-Ma'arri visited a Christian monastery near Latakia where he listened to Hellenistic philosophy debates that birthed his secularism, but other historians such as Ibn al-Adim deny that he had been exposed to any theology other than Islamic doctrine. Aisha Abd al-Rahman details Ibn al-Adim's evidence regarding anachronisms in the accounts of later compilers, including Ibn Kathir. She highlights Ibn al-Adim's documentation that the House of Knowledge (Dar al-Ilm) in Tripoli was established by Qadi Jalal al-Mulk Ibn Ammar in 472 AH (1079 CE), twenty-three years after al-Ma'arri's death in 449 AH (1057 CE). These accounts confused al-Ma'arri's verified journey to the House of Knowledge in Baghdad with the later Tripoli institution. Abd al-Rahman attributes the monastery narrative to subsequent transmitters who sought to tie his scholarship to Hellenistic philosophy. She argues that the widespread presence of Christian monasteries across Islamic territories makes the claim of a singular, transformative philosophical encounter illogical. She documents that Greek philosophical works were already translated and integrated into Arabic scholarship over two centuries before al-Ma'arri's era. She concludes that chroniclers formulated these narratives to credit foreign origins, discounting the capacity of his native Islamic environment.

In 1004–05, al-Ma'arri learned that his father had died and, in reaction, wrote an elegy where he praised his father. Years later he would travel to Baghdad where he became well received in the literary salons of the time, though he was a controversial figure. After the eighteen months in Baghdad, al-Ma'arri returned home for unknown reasons. He may have returned because his mother was ill, or he may have run out of money in Baghdad, as he refused to sell his works. He returned to his native town of Ma'arra in about 1010 and learned that his mother had died before his arrival.

He remained in Ma'arra for the rest of his life, where he opted for an ascetic lifestyle, refusing to sell his poems, living in seclusion, and observing a vegan diet. His personal confinement to his house was only broken once when violence had struck his town. In that incident, al-Ma'arri went to Aleppo to intercede with its Mirdasid emir, Salih ibn Mirdas, to release his brother Abu'l-Majd and several other Muslim notables from Ma'arra who were held responsible for destroying a winehouse whose Christian owner was accused of molesting a Muslim woman. Though he was confined, he lived out his later years continuing his work and collaborating with others. He enjoyed great respect and attracted many students locally, as well as actively holding correspondence with scholars abroad. Despite his intentions of living a secluded lifestyle, in his seventies, he became rich and was the most revered person in his area. Al-Ma'arri never married and died in May 1057 in his hometown.

== Works ==
=== The Tinder Spark (Saqṭ az-Zand; سقط الزند) ===
Poem from Luzūmīyāt, read in Arabic
The restrictive rhyme and meter can be heard in the start of poem 197

An early collection of his poems appeared as The Tinder Spark (Saqṭ az-Zand; سقط الزند). The collection of poems included praise of people of Aleppo and the Hamdanid ruler Sa'd al-Dawla. It gained popularity and established his reputation as a poet. A few poems in the collection were about armour.

=== Unnecessary Necessity (Luzūm mā lam yalzam لزوم ما لا يلزم) ===
A second, more original collection appeared under the title Unnecessary Necessity (Luzūm mā lam yalzam لزوم ما لا يلزم), or simply Necessities (Luzūmīyāt اللزوميات). The title refers to how al-Ma'arri saw the business of living and alludes to the unnecessary complexity of the rhyme scheme used.

=== The Epistle of Forgiveness (Risalat al-Ghufran رسالة الغفران) ===
His third work is a work of prose known as The Epistle of Forgiveness (Risalat al-Ghufran رسالة الغفران). The work was written as a direct response to the Arabic poet Ibn al-Qarih, whom al-Ma'arri mocks for his religious views. In this work, the poet visits paradise and meets the Arab poets of the pagan period. This view is shared by Islamic scholars, who often argued that pre-Islamic Arabs are indeed capable of entering paradise. Because of the aspect of conversing with the deceased in paradise, the Risalat al-Ghufran has been compared to the Divine Comedy of Dante which came hundreds of years after. The work has also been noted to be similar to Ibn Shuhayd's Risala al-tawabi' wa al-zawabi, though there is no evidence that al-Ma'arri was inspired by Ibn Shuhayd nor is there any evidence that Dante was inspired by al-Ma'arri. Algeria reportedly banned The Epistle of Forgiveness from the International Book Fair held in Algiers in 2007.

=== Other works ===
Paragraphs and Periods (al-Fuṣūl wa al-Ghāyāt) is a collection of homilies. The work has been accused of being a parody of or an attempt to imitate the Quran.

Al-Ma'arri also composed a significant corpus of verse riddles.

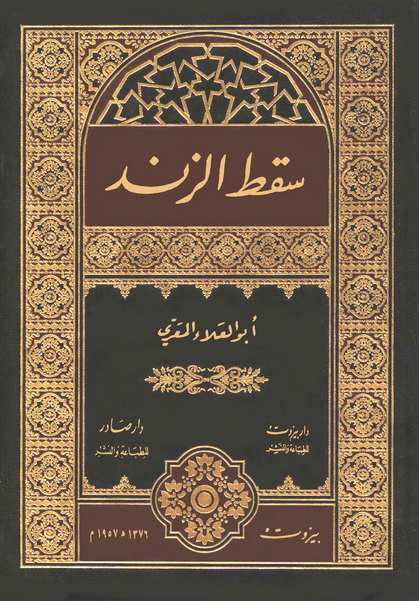
Saqt al-Zand

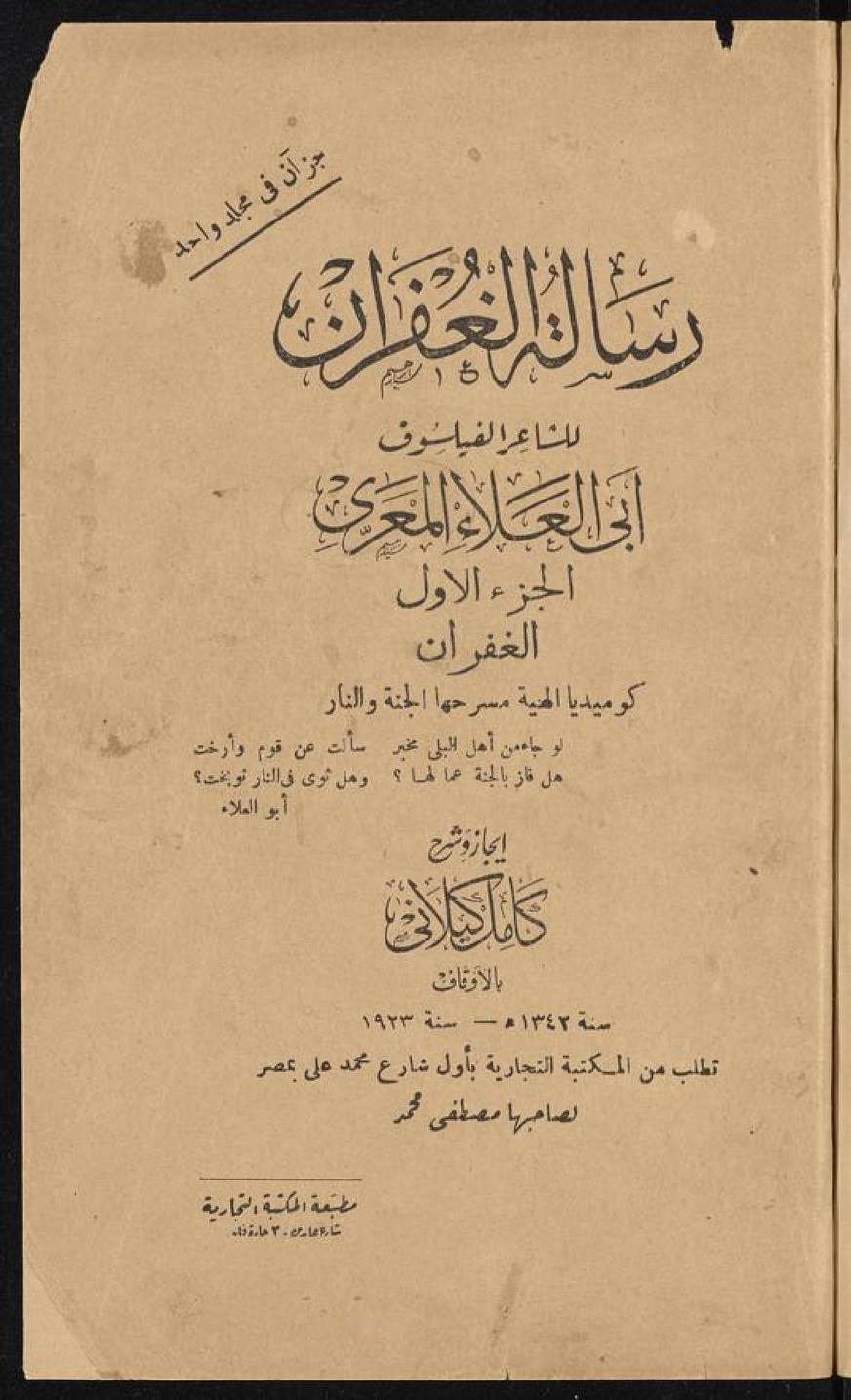
Risalat al-Gufran

== Views ==
=== Opposition to religion ===
In early Western scholarship, taking cues from his own detractors, Al-Ma'arri has frequently been characterized as a skeptic who denounced superstition and dogmatism in religion. This specific interpretation of his poetry, along with his general negative view on life, has led to descriptions of him as a pessimistic freethinker. Throughout his philosophical writings, a recurring theme highlighted by these early critics is the idea that reason holds a privileged position over traditions, suggesting that relying on the preconceptions and established norms of society can be limiting.

Based on a study of some of his poetry, early orientalists such as Reynold A. Nicholson argued that Al-Ma'arri viewed religion as a "fable invented by the ancients", suggesting he considered it worthless except for those who exploit the credulous masses. This historical viewpoint is frequently illustrated by translations found in early 20th-century encyclopedias:

Do not suppose the statements of the prophets to be true; they are all fabrications. Men lived comfortably till they came and spoiled life. The sacred books are only such a set of idle tales as any age could have and indeed did actually produce.

Based on Nicholson's translations, Al-Ma'arri was understood by scholars to have criticized many Islamic dogmas; Nicholson notably cited a verse where the poet allegedly described the Hajj as "a pagan's journey". In this framework, Al-Ma'arri was depicted as rejecting claims of divine revelation, with his creed characterized as that of a philosopher and ascetic for whom reason provides a moral guide and virtue is its own reward. Nicholson argued that his perceived secularist views targeted Judaism and Christianity equally, quoting Al-Ma'arri's observation that monks in their cloisters and devotees in their mosques blindly followed their local beliefs, and would have become Magians or Sabians had they been born among them. A verse frequently cited by these authors to summarize his apparent stance on organized religion reads: "The inhabitants of the earth are of two sorts: those with brains, but no religion, and those with religion, but no brains."

=== Scholarly defense and reinterpretation ===
The medieval historian and Qadi of Aleppo, Kamal ad-Din Ibn al-Adim (d. 1262), authored an extensive treatise titled Al-Insaf wa al-Tahharri (Equity and Investigation) defending al-Ma'arri. Ibn al-Adim for his part concluded that Al-Ma'arri's faith was orthodox and criticized his detractors for failing to investigate his actual beliefs before declaring him a heretic.

al-Ma'arri's final dictated work, Daw' al-Saqt (The Light of the Spark), is an apparent expression of his belief in Islam. Originally intended as a linguistic commentary on his early poetry, this late-life manuscript makes use of more orthodox Islamic theology, including a reverence for the Islamic prophet Muhammad, praise for Muhammad's companions, and unambiguous affirmations of the Day of Judgment. The prominent medieval historian Ibn al-Wardi, who had initially classified al-Ma'arri as a heretic, would retract his accusations after examining the manuscript. In his historical chronicle, Ibn al-Wardi documented his shift in perspective, stating that Daw' al-Saqt definitively "clarified his return to the truth and the soundness of his faith," noting that as it was al-Ma'arri's final work, "deeds are judged by their endings." Directly addressing accusations of heresy and apostasy, which was punishable by death under classical Islamic law, al-Ma'arri authored the apologetic work Zajr al-Nabih (Repelling the Barker) at the urging of concerned friends. Amjad al-Trabulsi, who edited the manuscript, argues for a significant historiographical discrepancy: while classical biographers such as al-Qifti and al-Dhahabi officially listed Zajr al-Nabih in Al-Ma'arri's bibliography, they had seemingly failed to quote its contents when evaluating his beliefs, relying instead on controversial interpretations of his poetry. In Zajr al-Nabih, al-Ma'arri clarified that verses appearing to mock religion were directed at the corruption of religious practitioners or were critiques of other faiths. Regarding the specific claim that he called the Hajj a "pagan's journey," he explained that his poetry was condemning the hypocrisy of certain pilgrims, not the Islamic ritual itself, which he affirmed as a valid hardship for eternal reward.

There has been an effort by modern Arab and Muslim literary critics to redeem al-Ma'arri from the accusations of zandaqa which surrounded him in life and the centuries after. They argue that al-Ma'arri's reputation as a heretic stems largely from selective readings of his poetry and the restating of claims made by his earlier detractors. The Indian Muslim philologist Abd al-Aziz al-Maymani (d. 1978) argued that many of the blatantly heretical verses attributed to al-Ma'arri were later pseudipigraphic fabrications by his detractors. al-Maymani noted that these fabricated poems often contained weak linguistic structures completely inconsistent with al-Ma'arri's renowned mastery of Arabic. He also documented that strict Maliki scholars from al-Andalus cited al-Ma'arri favorably, and recorded testimonies from figures like Al-Silafi acknowledging his piety and repentance from his early skepticism.

In the 1991 critical edition of al-Batalyawsi's commentary on the Luzumiyat, the editor Hamid Abd al-Majid provides a comprehensive textual analysis addressing the origins of the controversies around al-Ma'arri's alleged heresy. Abd al-Majid argues that al-Ma'arri was fully aware of the systematic forgery of his poetry by his regional detractors. According to a surviving letter cited in the edition, known as Risalat al-Sabi'in, al-Ma'arri complained to the Aleppine ruler Thimal bin Salih about two specific contemporaries, including al-Sharif bin al-Mahbara, who deliberately altered his dictated verses to accuse him of disbelief. In this narrative, al-Ma'arri described himself directly as "a lied-about old man" (shaykh makdhub a'layh). To counter these organized distortions, al-Ma'arri authored Zajr al-Nabih to defend his work, and subsequently wrote a tract titled Najr al-Zajr specifically to isolate the fabricated verses and clarify their intended meanings. Abd al-Majid notes a historical divergence in the textual transmission of the Luzumiyat; while the Eastern copies suffered heavily from deliberate interpolation by his enemies, the early copies transcribed by his trusted students and transmitted to Al-Andalus remained intact. These Andalusian manuscripts, utilized by al-Batalyawsi, completely omitted the blatantly heretical lines found in the Eastern versions and consistently reflected orthodox Islamic theology. As a practical example of this textual corruption, the edition points to a well-known verse attributed to al-Ma'arri claiming that all religions are equal in misguidance; Abd al-Majid notes that the verified Andalusian text contains an entirely different wording that conforms with Islamic orthodoxy. Furthermore, the commentary addresses the misinterpretation of al-Ma'arri's authentic verses by critics lacking jurisprudential expertise. Citing the medieval scholar Abu al-Fadl al-Khwarizmi, Abd al-Majid explains that verses commonly interpreted as mocking the rituals of Hajj were technical legal debates regarding the specific timing of rites at Mina and Muzdalifah, reflecting his knowledge of Islamic jurisprudence rather than a rejection of the pilgrimage. The critical text also collates accounts from al-Ma'arri's contemporaries to affirm his religious practice; historians such as al-Silafi and Ibn al-Adim report that the judge Abu al-Fath observed al-Ma'arri weeping intensely and rubbing his face in the dirt out of fear of the afterlife upon reciting a Quranic verse, an event that led the judge to confirm the strength of his faith.

=== Assessment of his Philosophical Status ===
Taha Hussein categorized Al-Ma'arri as a genuine philosopher, arguing that his practical asceticism perfectly aligned with his intellectual conclusions. Hussein asserted that while Al-Ma'arri extensively studied Greek philosophy in Antioch, Tripoli, and Baghdad, his true philosophical status was cemented by his ability to live according to his findings rather than merely transmitting foreign knowledge.

Amin al-Khuli disputed this classification, arguing that Al-Ma'arri's output lacks the systematic methodology required for philosophical inquiry. Al-Khuli observed that Al-Ma'arri's writings consist of scattered literary reflections heavily reliant on linguistic ornamentation rather than logical deduction. He identified severe epistemological and doctrinal contradictions across Al-Ma'arri's works, noting that he simultaneously affirmed and denied the possibility of knowledge. Furthermore, Al-Khuli highlighted a disconnect between Al-Ma'arri's stated beliefs and his behavior; despite advocating for absolute isolation and expressing a hatred for life, he maintained social interactions, received students, and clung to existence.

In his book Abu al-'Ala' wa Ma Ilayh, Abd al-Aziz al-Maymani attempted to reconcile these inconsistencies by describing Al-Ma'arri as a "natural philosopher." Al-Maymani argued that Al-Ma'arri was observing the dual nature of worldly phenomena—recognizing that things can be beneficial in certain contexts and harmful in others—comparing him to a skilled physician diagnosing an illness without artificiality or pretense. Al-Khuli rejected this reconciliation, stating that the distinction between "natural" and "artificial" philosophy is invalid, as a true philosopher must govern his life according to a coherent doctrine. He countered that Al-Ma'arri did not qualify his observations based on changing contexts; instead, he issued absolute, unconditional affirmations and negations throughout his life, creating genuine, irreconcilable contradictions that preclude him from being classified as a systematic philosopher.

Al-Khuli further contended that Al-Ma'arri dismantled the epistemological basis of philosophy by explicitly rejecting natural causality. According to Al-Khuli's analysis, Al-Ma'arri attributed all physical occurrences directly to absolute divine will and predestination, denying inherent natural properties; he cited verses where Al-Ma'arri claimed a sword only cuts or fails to cut based on immediate divine command rather than its physical sharpness. Additionally, Al-Khuli argued that Al-Ma'arri severely restricted the scope of intellectual inquiry by declaring the metaphysical study of the soul to be madness, citing divine concealment of such knowledge. Al-Khuli contrasted this stance with that of Al-Ghazali—historically recognized as a severe critic of philosophy—noting that while Al-Ghazali attempted to interpret scripture to permit philosophical inquiry into the soul, Al-Ma'arri unconditionally closed the door to such research, placing his methodology entirely outside the philosophical tradition.

=== Asceticism ===
Al-Ma'arri was an ascetic, renouncing worldly desires and living secluded from others while producing his works. He opposed all forms of violence. In Baghdad, while being well received, he decided not to sell his texts, which made it difficult for him to live.

=== Veganism ===
In al-Ma'arri's later years, he chose to stop consuming meat and all other animal products (i.e., he became a practicing vegan). He wrote:

Do not unjustly eat what the water has given up, and do not desire as food the flesh of slaughtered animals,
Or the white (milk) of mothers who intended its pure draught for their young, not for noble ladies.
And do not grieve the unsuspecting birds by taking their eggs; for injustice is the worst of crimes.
And spare the honey which the bees get betimes by their industry from the flowers of fragrant plants;
For they did not store it that it might belong to others, nor did they gather it for bounty and gifts.
I washed my hands of all this; and would that I had perceived my way ere my temples grew hoar!

al-Ma'arri's opposition to animal cruelty has been met with hostility on the part of certain later Islamic scholars, including Ibn al-Qayyim, who would remark, "among those who held this doctrine was one blind in both sight and insight: the dog of Ma’arrat al-Nu’man, known as Abu al-‘Ala’ al-Ma’arri".

=== Antinatalism ===
Al-Ma'arri's fundamental pessimism is expressed in his antinatalist recommendation that no children should be begotten, so as to spare them the pains of life. In an elegy composed by him over the loss of a relative, he combines his grief with observations on the ephemerality of this life:

Soften your tread. Methinks the earth's surface is but bodies of the dead,
Walk slowly in the air, so you do not trample on the remains of God's servants.

Al-Ma'arri's self-composed epitaph, on his tomb, states (in regard to life and being born): "This is my father's crime against me, which I myself committed against none."

== Legacy ==
Al-Ma'arri remains a polarizing figure in the modern era due to historical accusations regarding his religious orthodoxy. In 2013, during the Syrian Civil War, the al-Nusra Front demolished a statue of al-Ma'arri, which had been crafted in 1944 by the sculptor Fathi Muhammad. Reports indicated the militants targeted the monument because they classified him as a heretic, while other rumors suggested the destruction was motivated by local claims linking his lineage to the Assad family.

== Editions ==
- Risalat al-Ghufran, a Divine Comedy. Translated by G. Brackenbury 1943.
- The Epistle of Forgiveness: Volume One: A Vision of Heaven and Hell. Translated by Geert Jan Van Gelder and Gregor Schoeler. Library of Arabic Literature, New York University Press 2013.
- The Epistle of Forgiveness: Volume Two: Hypocrites, Heretics, and Other Sinners. Translated by Geert Jan Van Gelder and Gregor Schoeler. Library of Arabic Literature, New York University Press 2014.
- Those riddles of al-Maʿarrī that are cited in al-Ḥaẓīrī's twelfth-century Kitāb al-Iʿjāz fī l-aḥājī wa-l-alghāz have been edited as Abū l-ʿAlāˀ al-Maʿarrī, Dīwān al-alġāz, riwāyat Abī l-Maʿālī al-Ḥaẓīrī, ed. by Maḥmūd ʿAbdarraḥīm Ṣāliḥ (Riyadh [1990]).

== See also ==
- Abbasid Caliphate
- Arabic literature
- Islamic Golden Age
- List of vegans
- Veganism

== Sources ==
- Beeston, A. F. L. The Cambridge History of Arabic Literature. Cambridge University Press.
- Browne, Edward Granville (1999) [1906]. A Literary History of Persia. Curzon. ISBN 978-0-7007-0406-4.
- Glassé, Cyril (2001). "al-Ma'arrī, Abū-l-'Alā'". The New Encyclopedia of Islam. Introduction by Huston Smith. AltaMira Press. ISBN 9780759101906.
- Grigoryan, Sona (2023). Neither Belief nor Unbelief: Intentional Ambivalence in al-Maʿarrī's Luzūm. De Gruyter.
- Hitti, Philip Khuri (1968). Islam, a Way of Life. University of Minnesota Press. ISBN 9781452910406.
- Holt, P. M.; Lambton, Ann K. S.; Lewis, Bernard, eds. (1977). "Religion and Culture". The Cambridge History of Islam. Cambridge University Press. ISBN 978-0-521-29138-5.
- Khalidi, Tarif (1994). Arabic Historical Thought in the Classical Period. Cambridge University Press. doi:10.1017/CBO9780511583650. ISBN 0-521-46554-0.
- Majid, Anouar (18 September 2007). A Call for Heresy: Why Dissent Is Vital to Islam and America. Minneapolis: University of Minnesota Press. ISBN 978-0-8166-5127-6.
- Nicholson, Reynold Alleyne (2006). A Literary History of the Arabs. Kessinger Publishing. ISBN 978-1-4286-3576-0.
- Smoor, P. (1984). "al-Ma'arri". In Gibb, H. A. R. (ed.). The Encyclopaedia of Islam. Vol. 3, Part 1. Brill. pp. 927–935.
- Smoor, Pieter (2006). Meri, Josef W.; Bacharach, Jere L. (eds.). Medieval Islamic Civilization. Routledge. ISBN 978-0-415-96691-7.
- Stewart, Devin (2017). "Rhythmical Anxiety: Notes on Abu l-'Ala al-Maarri's (d. 449/1058) al-Fusul wa'l-Ghayat and Its Reception". In Alshaar, Nuha (ed.). The Qur'an and Adab. The shaping of literary traditions in classical Islam. Oxford University Press. pp. 239–272.
- Watt, William Montgomery; Cachia, Pierre (1996). A History of Islamic Spain. Edinburgh University Press. ISBN 978-0-7486-0847-8.
- Zayzafoon, Lamia Ben Youssef (2005). The Production of the Muslim Woman. Lexington Books. ISBN 9780739110782.
