= Library of Arabic Literature =

Book series of Arabic literature

- Parent company: New York University Press
- Official website: https://www.libraryofarabicliterature.org/

The Library of Arabic Literature (Arabic: المكتبة العربية) is a bilingual book series that publishes English translations and Arabic editions of Arabic texts from the seventh to nineteenth centuries.

== Premise ==
The Library of Arabic Literature publishes editions of significant Arabic texts from the seventh to nineteenth centuries and their English translations. The series' aim is "to revive and reintroduce classic Arabic literature to a whole new generation of Arabs and non-Arabs, and make it more accessible and readable to everyone," as very little of the corpus of Arabic literature from this period is available to an English-speaking audience. The books are edited and translated by distinguished scholars of Arabic and Islam from around the world.

The series publishes each book in a hardcover parallel-text format, with Arabic and English on facing pages, as well as in English-only paperbacks and free downloadable Arabic PDFs. According to Ahram Online, the Library of Arabic Literature "has established itself as including go-to English versions of sometimes hard-to-find classical Arabic texts in the same way that the well-known Loeb series has done for classical Greek and Latin texts with their facing English translations." For some texts, the series also publishes separate scholarly editions with full critical apparatus.

Genres include poetry and prose, fiction, religion, philosophy, law, science, history, and travel writing.

The Library of Arabic Literature is published by NYU Press and supported by a grant from the New York University Abu Dhabi Research Institute.

The first volume was published in December 2012.

== Awards ==
The Library of Arabic Literature's award-winning edition-translations include Leg Over Leg by Ahmad Faris al-Shidyaq, edited and translated by Humphrey Davies, which was shortlisted for the American Literary Translators Association's 2016 National Translation Award and longlisted for the 2014 Best Translated Book Award, organized by Open Letter; Virtues of the Imam Ahmad ibn Hanbal by Ibn al-Jawzi, edited and translated by Michael Cooperson, which won the Sheikh Hamad Award for Translation and International Understanding in 2016; The Epistle of Forgiveness by Al-Ma'arri, edited and translated by Geert Jan van Gelder and Gregor Schoeler, which won the Sheikh Hamad Award for Translation and International Understanding in 2015; and Impostures by al-Hariri, edited and translated by Michael Cooperson, which won the 2020 Sheikh Zayed Book Award in the Translation Category, shortlisted for the 2021 National Translation Award, was a Finalist for the 2021 PROSE Award in the Literature category, and was on The Wall Street Journal's list of Top 10 Books of the Year.

== Publications ==
As of 2024, the Library of Arabic Literature has published more than fifty bilingual hardcover edition-translations and more than forty English-only paperbacks. Arabic-only PDFs are also available for download from the website for free. All books are published in all three formats unless otherwise noted. Forewords only appear in the paperback versions.

=== 2012 ===
- Classical Arabic Literature: A Library of Arabic Literature Anthology, translated by Geert Jan van Gelder (English only)

=== 2013 ===
- The Epistle on Legal Theory by Muhammad ibn Idris al-Shafi'i, edited and translated by Joseph E. Lowry; foreword by Kecia Ali
- The Epistle of Forgiveness, Volume One: A Vision of Heaven and Hell by Abū l-ʿAlāʾ al-Maʿarrī, edited and translated by Geert Jan van Gelder and Gregor Schoeler; foreword by Matthew Reynolds
- Virtues of the Imam Ahmad ibn Ḥanbal, Volume One by Ibn al-Jawzī, edited and translated by Michael Cooperson; also abridged with volume two as The Life of ibn Ḥanbal, with a foreword by Garth Fowden
- Leg over Leg, Volume One by Aḥmad Fāris al-Shidyāq, edited and translated by Humphrey Davies
- Leg over Leg, Volume Two by Aḥmad Fāris al-Shidyāq, edited and translated by Humphrey Davies

=== 2014 ===
- The Epistle of Forgiveness, Volume Two: Hypocrites, Heretics, and Other Sinners by Abū l-ʿAlāʾ al-Maʿarrī, edited and translated by Geert Jan van Gelder and Gregor Schoeler; foreword by Matthew Reynolds
- The Principles of Sufism by ʿĀʾishah al-Bāʿūniyyah, edited and translated by Th. Emil Homerin; foreword by Ros Ballaster
- A Treasury of Virtues: Sayings, Sermons, and Teachings of 'Ali, with the One Hundred Proverbs attributed to al-Jahiz by al-Qāḍī al-Quḍāʿī, edited and translated by Tahera Qutbuddin; foreword by Rowan Williams
- The Expeditions: An Early Biography of Muḥammad by Maʿmar ibn Rāshid, edited and translated by Sean W. Anthony; foreword by M.A.S. Abdel Haleem
- Leg over Leg, Volume Three by Aḥmad Fāris al-Shidyāq, edited and translated by Humphrey Davies
- Leg over Leg, Volume Four by Aḥmad Fāris al-Shidyāq, edited and translated by Humphrey Davies
- Two Arabic Travel Books (published together in hardcover and separately in paperback)
  - Accounts of China and India by Abū Zayd al-Sīrāfī, edited and translated by Tim Mackintosh-Smith; foreword by Zvi Ben-Dor Benite
  - Mission to the Volga by Aḥmad ibn Faḍlān, edited and translated by James E. Montgomery; foreword by Tim Severin

=== 2015 ===
- Virtues of the Imam Ahmad ibn Ḥanbal, Volume Two by Ibn al-Jawzī, edited and translated by Michael Cooperson
- Disagreements of the Jurists: A Manual of Islamic Legal Theory by al-Qāḍī al-Nuʿmān, edited and translated by Devin Stewart; foreword by John J. Coughlin and John Sexton
- Consorts of the Caliphs: Women and the Court of Baghdad by Ibn al-Sāʿī, edited by Shawkat M. Toorawa and translated by The Editors of the Library of Arabic Literature; introduction by Julia Bray and foreword by Marina Warner
- What ʿĪsā ibn Hishām Told Us: or, A Period of Time, Volume One by Muḥammad al-Muwayliḥī, edited and translated by Roger Allen; foreword by Maria Golia
- What ʿĪsā ibn Hishām Told Us: or, A Period of Time, Volume Two by Muḥammad al-Muwayliḥī, edited and translated by Roger Allen; foreword by Maria Golia
- The Life and Times of Abū Tammām by Abū Bakr al-Ṣūlī, edited and translated by Beatrice Gruendler; foreword by Terence Cave

=== 2016 ===
- The Sword of Ambition: Bureaucratic Rivalry in Medieval Egypt by ʿUthmān ibn Ibrāhīm al-Nābulusī, edited and translated by Luke Yarbrough; foreword by Sherman 'Abd al-Hakim Jackson
- Brains Confounded by the Ode of Abū Shādūf Expounded, Volume One by Yūsuf al-Shirbīnī, edited and translated by Humphrey Davies; foreword by Youssef Rakha
- Brains Confounded by the Ode of Abū Shādūf Expounded, Volume Two by Yūsuf al-Shirbīnī, edited and translated by Humphrey Davies
- A Hundred and One Nights, edited and translated by Bruce Fudge; foreword by Robert Irwin
- Risible Rhymes by Muḥammad ibn Maḥfūẓ al-Sanhūrī, edited and translated by Humphrey Davies (in paperback, collected with Brains Confounded, Volume Two)
- Light in the Heavens: Sayings of the Prophet Muhammad by al-Qāḍī al-Quḍāʿī, edited and translated by Tahera Qutbuddin

=== 2017 ===
- The Excellence of the Arabs by Ibn Qutaybah, translated by Sarah Bowen Savant and Peter Webb and edited by James E. Montgomery and Peter Webb
- Scents and Flavors: A Syrian Cookbook, edited and translated by Charles Perry
- Arabian Satire: Poetry from 18th-Century Najd by Ḥmēdān al-Shwēʿir, edited and translated by Marcel Kurpershoek

=== 2018 ===
- In Darfur: An Account of the Sultanate and Its People, Volume One by Muḥammad al-Tūnisī, edited and translated by Humphrey Davies; introduction by R.S. O'Fahey
- In Darfur: An Account of the Sultanate and Its People, Volume Two by Muḥammad al-Tūnisī, edited and translated by Humphrey Davies
- Diwan ʿAntarah ibn Shaddad: A Literary-Historical Study by James E. Montgomery (Arabic text with English scholarly apparatus)
- Arabian Romantic: Poems on Bedouin Life and Love by ʿAbdallāh ibn Sbayyil, edited and translated by Marcel Kurpershoek
- War Songs by ʿAntarah ibn Shaddād, edited and translated by James E. Montgomery with Richard Sieburth; foreword by Peter Cole

== Editorial Board Members ==
- Philip F. Kennedy (New York University) - General Editor
- James E. Montgomery (University of Cambridge) - Executive Editor
- Shawkat M. Toorawa (Yale University) - Executive Editor
- Sean W. Anthony (Ohio State University) - Editor
- Huda J. Fakhreddine (University of Pennsylvania) - Editor
- Lara Harb (Princeton University) - Editor
- Maya Kesrouany (New York University Abu Dhabi) - Editor
- Enass Khansa (American University of Beirut) - Editor
- Bilal Orfali (American University of Beirut) - Editor
- Maurice A. Pomerantz (New York University Abu Dhabi) - Editor
- Mohammed Rustom (Carleton University) - Editor
- Julia Bray (University of Oxford) - Consulting Editor
- Michael Cooperson (University of California, Los Angeles) - Consulting Editor
- Joseph E. Lowry (University of Pennsylvania) - Consulting Editor
- Tahera Qutbuddin (University of Oxford) - Consulting Editor
- Devin J. Stewart (Emory University) - Consulting Editor

== See also ==
- Loeb Classical Library - a similar bilingual series for Greek and Latin classics
- Clay Sanskrit Library - a Sanskrit bilingual series
