= Hadith Isa bin Hisham =

1898–1903 maqama by Muhammad al-Muwaylihi

- Author: Muhammad al-Muwaylihi
- Original title: حديث عيسى بن هشام أو فترة من الزمن
- Translator: Roger Allen
- Language: Arabic
- Publication date: 1907
- English publication date: 2015

Hadith Isa bin Hisham, or "A Period in Time" (Arabic: حديث عيسى بن هشام أو فترة من الزمن) is a work of literature by Muḥammad al-Muwayliḥī first published in serial form between April 1898 and August 1903 in the Egyptian newspaper Misbah ash-Sharq. The serialized pieces were compiled and published in a book in 1907.

The episodes published serially often presented satirical political commentary in the vein of Yaqub Sanu's Abu Naddara or Abdullah an-Nadeem's at-Tankit wat-Tabkit.

The work is characterized by a combination of old and new styles. It takes the form of a maqama, a classic form of Arabic literature dating back to the 10th century, and its protagonist and titular character is Isa bin Hisham—protagonist of Badi' az-Zaman al-Hamadhani's classic Baghdadi Maqama. In the story, Isa bin Hisham wanders through a cemetery for reflection and encounters an Ottoman pasha revived from the dead. Through their journey together, Muwayliḥī raisies critiques of Egyptian society and comments on the changes and reforms that impacted it in the last period of the Ottoman Empire, in the judicial system, policing, education, theater, and in other areas. One of the issues Muwayliḥī addresses is the question of authenticity and modernity.

It was the only book other than the Qur'an that Naguib Mahfouz's father had read.

== Editions ==
- Muḥammad al-Muwayliḥī, al-Aʿmāl al-kāmila (“Complete works”), 2 vols., ed. Roger Allen, Cairo 2002.

Translations

- Muḥammad al-Muwayliḥī, A Period of Time, trans. Roger Allen, Reading 1992 (developed from Roger Allen's Oxford 1968 doctoral dissertation)
- Muḥammad al-Muwayliḥī, What ʿĪsā ibn Hishām Told Us, Or, A Period of Time, trans. Roger Allen, 2 vols., New York University Press, 2015
