= Al Ustadh =

Literary and political journal in Egypt (1892–1893)

- Editor: Abdullah al-Nadeem
- Categories: Satirical magazine Literary magazine Political magazine
- Founder: Abdullah Al Nadim
- Founded: 1892
- First issue: 24 August 1892
- Final issue: 13 June 1893
- Country: Egypt
- Based in: Cairo
- Language: Arabic

Al Ustadh (Arabic: الأستاذ, lit. 'The Master') was a satirical, literary and political journal that was established by Abdullah Al Nadim in Cairo, Egypt, and published for eleven months in the period August 1892–June 1893. Although it was a short-lived publication, it played an important role in the development of short story genre in Arabic.

== History and profile ==
Al Ustadh was launched by Abdullah Al Nadim, an Egyptian writer and political activist, as his third journal in Cairo in 1892. The first issue appeared on 24 August 1892. Al Nadim had been living out of Cairo for a decade following the ʻUrabi revolt and started Al Ustadh shortly after his return to the city. He established the journals Al Tankit wal Tabkit and Al Taif before his exile. Sabry Hafez argues that of his journals Al Ustadh is the most prominent one in terms of its influence.

Al Nadim adopted a rationalist approach when he started Al Ustadh which featured satirical content and drawings, didactic fictional materials and political articles. The fictional materials were written in the colloquial prose like those in Abu Naddara, a magazine by Yaqub Sanu. In the articles published in Al Ustadh Al Nadim frequently referred to his former writings published in his early journal Al Tankit wal Tabkit and focused on the Arabic language as a major element of the national identity of Egyptians. He also published sketches of hashish consumption which he considered as one of the reasons for the underdeveloped status of the Egyptian society. Al Nadim was forced by Cromer, British colonial administrator in Egypt, to close Al Ustadh, and the last issue appeared on 13 June 1893 which contained a letter of thanks to the subscribers . Following this incident Al Nadim left Egypt due to his ongoing opposition to the British rule in Egypt.
