= Muhammad al-Muwaylihi =

Egyptian author and journalist (1858–1930)

The nameplate or masthead of Al-Urwah al-Wuthqa, an anti-colonial Islamic revolutionary journal which al-Muwaylihi helped to publish in Paris.

Muḥammad al-Muwayliḥī (Arabic: محمد المويلحي; born 1858, died 1930) was an Egyptian author and journalist of the Nahda. He edited Misbah ash-Sharq and published Fatra Min az-Zamān, a serialized literary work of social and political satire, compiled and published as a book entitled Hadith Isa bin Hisham in 1907.

== Biography ==
He was born in 1858 into a family of silk merchants. He was arrested for distributing a political leaflet authored by his father, Ibrāhīm al-Muwayliḥī in the period before the ʻUrabi revolt. Although he was originally sentenced to death, his sentence was commuted; he was exiled and went to Italy to join his father. The two went to Paris in 1884 and helped Jamāl ad-Dīn al-Afghānī and Muḥammad ʿAbduh with the publication of the anti-colonial Islamic revolutionary journal al-ʿUrwa al-wuthqā.

The Muwayliḥīs were expelled from France following the fourth issue of their newspaper al-Ittiḥād, which was sharply critical of the Ottoman sultan. After a brief time in London, they were invited to Istanbul and moved there in 1885. With access to the Fāṭih library, Muḥammad had access to important works of Arabic literature and transcribed a number of them, including works of Abū l-ʿAlāʾ al-Maʿarrī—his favorite poet.

In 1887, Muḥammad al-Muwayliḥī returned to Egypt. He wrote for Al Muqattam under a number of pseudonyms. He met the Englishman Wilfrid Scawen Blunt and gained access to the circle of Princess Nāzlī Fāḍil which included Muḥammad ʿAbduh, Saʿd Zaghlūl, Aḥmad Fatḥī Zaghlūl, Qāsim Amīn, Muṣṭafā Fahmī, ʿAlī Yūsuf, and Ḥāfiẓ Ibrāhīm.

The newspaper Miṣbāḥ al-sharq (“Lamp of the east”), edited by Muḥammad al-Muwayliḥī and his father Ibrāhīm, was launched on April 14, 1898. In this newspaper, Muḥammad published Fatra Min az-Zamān, a serialized literary work of social and political satire.

== On other writers ==
=== Ahmed Shawqi ===
Muḥammad al-Muwayliḥī was a famous critic of Egypt's poet laureate Ahmed Shawqi, particularly after the first volume of his anthology ash-Shawqiyat was published.In at least two dedicated articles, al-Muwayliḥī accused Shawqi of a kind of experimentation he considered heretical: he saw Shawqi's publishing of an autobiography as boastful and unprecedented in Arabic poetry; his prose, unbecoming of a poet whose single expressive voice should be poetry; his Western influence from his studies in Europe, "repugnant" and unworthy of the proud Arabic poetic tradition.

These discussions about tradition, authenticity, and formality against experimentation, vulgarity, and Westernization were typical of the Nahda and transcended language and literature, reaching more broadly into other changes happening in culture and society at the time.

English translation of the book by Roger Allen, published by NYU Press in the Library of Arabic Literature series.

== Editions ==
- Muḥammad al-Muwayliḥī, al-Aʿmāl al-kāmila (“Complete works”), 2 vols., ed. Roger Allen, Cairo 2002.

Professor Gaber Asfour, Director-General of the Supreme Council for Culture in Egypt, requested this edition of Roger Allen.

Translations

- Muḥammad al-Muwayliḥī, A period of time, trans. Roger Allen, Reading 1992

This translation was developed from Roger Allen's doctoral dissertation, completed under the supervision of Muhammad Mustafa Badawi at Oxford in 1968.

- Muḥammad al-Muwayliḥī, What ʿĪsā ibn Hishām told us, trans. Roger Allen, 2 vols., New York University Press, 2015.

== Miscellaneous ==
Muḥammad al-Muwayliḥī appears in Samia Mehrez's Cairo Literary Atlas.
