= Abdullah an-Nadeem =

Egyptian writer and political activist

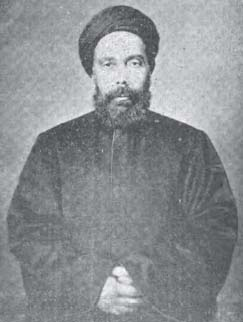
Abdulla an-Nadeem

Abdullah an-Nadeem (1843-October 1896, Arabic: عبد الله النديم ) was a significant Egyptian writer and political activist. He was a major figure during the Urabi revolt with many considering him the voice of the revolution. An-Nadeem was brought up in Alexandria. Poverty played an important role in his life, as he did not receive a formal education and came from the poor districts of Egypt at a time of financial and economic crisis. Corruption in the state, foreign intervention, and exploitation in political power were main aspects of an-Nadeem's political writings and speeches. He sought to overthrow the government that depended on foreigners and advocated for protecting the nation. His nationalist ideologies and political activism were greatly influenced by Jamal al-Din al-Afghani and Muhammed Abduh. An-Nadeem considered himself a self-taught scholar as he mentioned in his book “Kan wa yakoon”; (Was and Will Be).

== Early life ==
Abdullah an-Nadeem (born Abdullah bin Mesbah) was born in Alexandria in 1843 to a poor Egyptian family. His father, Mesbah bin Ibrahim el-Hosni, was a baker. An-Nadeem grew up in El-Gomrok district, a poor neighbourhood near the main port of Alexandria.

His father sent him to the district's kottab, a simple form of schooling. He learned how to read and write and was able to learn the Qur’an by heart when he was only nine years old. In 1855, the poor conditions of his family prevented him from studying at Al-Azhar so his father sent him to El Noor mosque, near his home. He excelled at Islamic jurisprudence, logic, religious studies, and Arabic grammar. He studied under Ibrahim El Sersi, Ibrahim El Shaf’ai, and Mohammed Al-‘Ashry, and others.

However, an-Nadeem was not thrilled by the education he was receiving at the mosque and decided to drop out. Instead, he decided to roam the streets and towns in Alexandria in search for intellectual seminars, poetry recitals, and lectures at local cafes and ventures. During this time he excelled in writing and speech. He became famous for his style and was considered a local celebrity in Alexandria. When word reached his father, he refused to support him financially unless he returned to the mosque. An-Nadeem decided to leave Alexandria and headed south.

When he was 17, an-Nadeem learned Morse code and got a job as a telegraph operator in Banha and was later transferred to Qasar al-Ali in Cairo, which was the residential palace of Hoshiyar Hanim, mother of the Khedive Ismail.

=== Before political activism ===
An-Nadeem settled in Cairo for a while. He attended many seminars of literature, poetry, and culture. He befriended Al-Azhar writers and scholars along with well-known figures such as Mahmoud Sami el-Baroudi (who later on became the 5th prime minister of Egypt), Abdullah Fekry Pasha, Sheikh Abou Al- Nasr, Sheikh Ahmed Al-Rizkani, Mohammed Said Bey, and Mahmoud Safwat. Through their company an-Nadeem was exposed to Al-Azhar education and thought. At the same time Jamal al Din al-Afghani came to Cairo and began to lecture about the reformation of Islam. When he heard about him, he attended his lectures and was deeply impacted by his bold ideas. He became a recurring member of al-Afghani's councils and engaged in his seminars and learned from him reformation of religion, freedom of research, criticism and boldness in defending the right.

Al Afghani was quick to recognise an-Nadeem's capabilities so he began to privately tutor him, which influenced an-Nadeem's political and nationalist ideologies greatly. His recurrent visits to al-Afghani led to his termination from his job at the palace. Once again he was on the road. He resided at Mansoura where he found residence at the “Omada” of a small village and took a job as a private tutor for the Omda's children teaching them writing, reading, and religious studies. At that time he managed to learn more about the peasants living in Mansoura and the poor conditions that they suffered from. He didn't last long at this job, which led to his departure from Mansoura. When he finally found a job again as a government employee he headed back to Cairo where he was reunited with al-Afghani who began to take a more nationalist approach in his teachings and lessons. And since then an-Nadeem's political life began.

== Background ==
During the period of Khedive Ismail Egypt was on the verge of modernisation and connections with Europe increased specifically after the opening of the Suez Canal. Many Europeans came to Egypt to take advantage of the problematic fiscal situation that emerged during that time hoping to make huge fortunes from loaning the government money. Europeans began to take part in the cultural and economic life in Egypt. At the same time, the prominent Islamic ideologist and political activist Jamal al-Din al-Afghani came to Egypt. His teachings included religious reform and opposing foreign intervention promoting nationalist ideologies. Concurrently, reform and nationalist ideologies were spreading in many parts in Egypt. Al-Afghani had a major impact on nationalists and helped spread national political thought along with religious reformation.

The spread of national ideologies and religious reform played an important role in the emergence of political newspapers. Many newspapers emerged during that period due to al-Afghani's advocacy. Yaqub Sanu founded the satirical magazine Abu Naddara Zarqqa. It is considered the first satirical political magazine that appeared in Egypt. Sanu's use of colloquial language and cartoons made it very popular in Egyptian culture. Using this magazine, Sanu criticized the Khedive's policies and his entourage. He also criticized the government and the people for not calling for their rights. His emerging popularity irritated the Khedive who recognized the danger of Sanu and confiscated the magazine and banished him. Sanu resided in Paris and managed to publish his magazine and send many copies to Egypt. In that period from 1876 – 1879, al-Afghani supported the emergence of more newspapers and journalists such as Mekhail Abdel Sayyid who founded the Watan (nation) newspaper, Adeeb Isaiah the founder of Misr (Egypt) newspaper, also Selim Al Naqqash who founded the newspaper Al Tejara (commerce), brothers Selim and Beshara Tuqla who founded Al-Ahram, and Selim Anhory Mira’at Al Shark (mirror of the East). More newspapers appeared such as Al Mahrousa and Al Asr Al Jadeed.

These newspapers arose from popular culture using language and anecdotes that Egyptians were able to relate to. They called for reform of government, and also opposed foreign intervention not just in politics but also in social life. Journalists wrote from the empowerment of al-Afghani.

The situation in Egypt was unstable due financial problems because of the Khedive's expenditures that were on efforts to modernize Egypt in a European way. Money was spent on projects, luxury goods, and tributes to the Ottoman Sultan. More money was spent on the Suez Canal project and opening. The end of the American Civil War attributed to the decrease in cotton prices, which was Egypt's major revenue.

== Political life ==
An-Nadeem returned to Alexandria, which was full of nationalist associations and Arabic newspapers. He wrote in the newspapers Misr and Al-Tejara many articles in the voice and principles of Al-Afghani. An-Nadeem began to search for more political involvement so he searched for secret political movements in Alexandria, and in 1879 he joined the movement “Misr Al- Fatah”. It was a political organization working in secret and planning to overthrow the Khedive Ismail. They handed out political publications spreading nationalist ideologies and thought. They also wrote about the critical economic and political situation that was the result of the corrupt Khedive. Due to the secrecy, the organization's capabilities were limited and ineffective, but an-Nadeem was able to learn more about the discourse of patriotism and began to mingle more with people on the streets teaching and spreading nationalist and patriotic ideologies and lecturing people about the importance of democracy and a constitution. During that time, an-Nadeem founded his first newspaper Al Tankit wal Tabkit, which was a weekly newspaper with satirical content projecting hidden political messages. He then replaced it with Al Tayef (الطائف) newspaper which was more serious paper with a nationalist tone.

On 26 June 1879, the European governments were able to pressure and convince the Ottoman Sultan Abdel Hamid II to depose Ismail Pasha and appoint his son Tewfik Pasha instead with Riyad Pasha serving as prime minister.

Many were optimistic with this decision including an-Nadeem, the military officers, and al-Afghani. Tewfik Pasha was one of many students of al-Afghani and had many times attended seminars and lectures with national figures and writers including an-Nadeem. Tewfik's era did not improve Egypt's situation. On the contrary, there was more British and French intervention in domestic affairs.

=== Urabi Revolt ===
Military officers under the leadership of Ahmed Urabi began to form secret movements spreading awareness of the foreign intervention in Egyptian affairs. They persuaded an-Nadeem to join them. An-Nadeem found that the officers were targeting reformation and independency from foreign influence. He participated with his writings and speeches. With his style and articulation, an-Nadeem was able to summon people to the Urabi movement and he spoke of the importance of political activism and social reform. Urabi appointed an-Nadeem as his personal advisor and through his writings and speeches, an-Nadeem enforced many people to join the military movement. In 1879 they formed the Egyptian Nationalist Party in the hopes of fostering a stronger national identity.

After years of discrimination, the military officers under the leadership of Urabi sent a petition to Riyad Pasha in January 1881. It was a demand to remove all discriminatory acts against Egyptians. Urabi asked an-Nadeem to write a charter to the Egyptian people requesting authorization to represent them. The movement had two public demands; the resignation of Riyad Pasha's government, and the formation of a council of representatives. An-Nadeem was a major component of a demonstration led by Urabi consisting of military officers and Egyptian civilians that headed to Abdeen Palace where the Khedive resided. The demands were met and Riyad's government was dissolved. Mohamed Sherif Pasha was appointed as Prime Minister and Head of Government. He saw great danger from an-Nadeem and his writings as someone who was able to shape public opinion and sway people to the officers’ movement. An-Nadeem mentioned in an article entitled “Bashing idiots” that it was the time in which laws protected citizens from the oppressors.

An-Nadeem kept writing about nationalism and the role of a nation in his articles. He supported the development of political associations specifically in Alexandria. However, his paper "al-Tayef" had become very popular and according to Ahmed Samir who was one of his students and who wrote a biography of an-Nadeem, the newspaper was used by the military officers to spread their political movement and ideologies without the an-Nadeem's consent; something that an-Nadeem was not very fond of.

=== British occupation ===
The British were especially concerned that Urabi would default on Egypt's massive debt and that he might try to regain control of the Suez Canal. So they placed their warships on the shore of Alexandria. Meanwhile, Tewfik fled to their protection, moving his court to Alexandria. The strong naval presence spurred fears of an imminent invasion. The French fleet was recalled to France. The British warships in the harbor opened fire on the city's gun emplacements after the Egyptians ignored an ultimatum from Admiral Seymour to remove them. In September 1882 the British army headed by Sir Archibald Alison landed in Alexandria were met by Egyptian forces headed by Urabi at the Battle of Kafr El Dawwar. Another army, led by Sir Garnet Wolseley, landed in the Canal Zone and on 13 September 1882 they defeated Urabi's army at the Battle of Tell El Kebir. From there, the British cavalry advanced on Cairo which surrendered without a shot being fired and the British occupation would start in Egypt.

== Later life ==
According to Samir, an-Nadeem was with Urabi at the Battle of Tell El Kebir, and he returned with Urabi to Cairo after the defeat, where Samir met him at Urabi's house. An-Nadeem sneaked out during the night and left for Kafr Al-Dawar with his father. Urabi had considered going to Alexandria to surrender to Tewfik in hope of a pardon. In his biography of an-Nadeem, Samir wrote that this was the last time he would see an-Nadeem for the next ten years. An-Nadeem disappeared, grew his beard and started wearing large turbans to avoid being recognized. He was finally arrested in a small town called "Meet al-Gharqa".

=== An-Nadeem during the British occupation ===
An-Nadeem was exiled to Jaffa for the first time in September 1891, although he did roam in many cities in this region including Nablus and Qalqilya. He remained in between these cities until the death of Khedive Tewfik Pasha in January 1892. He was succeeded by his son Abbas II Helmy Bey who allowed an-Nadeem to return to Egypt. Abbas II was supportive of Egyptian nationalists and an-Nadeem resumed his active role as a nationalist writer and founded the magazine Al Ustadh (الأستاذ) the Professor in May 1893. Through his articles and writings in Al Ustadh he criticized the British occupation and the idea of colonization. He specifically attacked many Egyptians who aided the British as he wrote a piece in Al Ustadh saying "I am your brother, why do you deny it?". He criticized their role in helping the British and the Europeans "who are tearing the East apart watching us burn like the lodges". This piece which was published in Al Ustadh infuriated Lord Cormer himself who demanded from the Khedive to exile an-Nadeem again. And through the British pressure, an-Nadeem's paper was closed down and he was exiled for the second time to Jaffa. However, after returning to Alexandria for a short while he was summoned to the Sultan's court and remained there working at the information Bureau.

=== An-Nadeem's political thought and legacy ===
An-Nadeem was a nationalist by heart. He was inspired by Al-Afghani's reformation ideologies and relied on journalism and speech to deliver his thoughts and opinions. His student Ahmed Samir and writers who have mentioned him have all claimed that his vocal abilities and linguistic capacities were immense. He was able to gather people and criticize them while they were standing listening to him very attentively. His publications and writing styles were popular. He was still effective and inspiring after he disappeared for ten years and returned from exile when he founded his last newspaper. Many state that Ahmed Urabi himself was impacted by an-Nadeem's nationalist views and ideologies. He believed in economic and religious reforms. He was a strong opposer to foreign intervention and colonization believing that the Arabs should not be subject to foreign rule.

== Death ==
An-Nadeem died in October 1896 at the age of 54. He was given an official funeral by the Sultan and many figures attended most prominently al-Afghani and Sheikh Mohammed al-Zafer. He was buried in Yahya Efendi cemetery in Beşiktaş in what is today Istanbul.
