= Sheikh Hamad Award for Translation and International Understanding =

Literary award in Arabic

The Sheikh Hamad Award for Translation and International Understanding is a Qatari literary award for translation from and to Arabic. The total value of the award is $2 million. It is named in honor of Hamad bin Khalifa Al Thani, the ruling Emir of Qatar from 1995 to 2013. It is among the world's richest literary prizes for translation.

== History ==
Sheikh Hamad Award for Translation and International Understanding was initiated by the FAIR Forum (Forum for Arab and International Relations), in Doha, Qatar in 2015, in order to revive the culture of honoring translation and translators, which has been one of the pillars of Arab civilization throughout the ages. From Bayt Al-Hikma (The House of Wisdom) to Madrasat Al-Alsun (School of languages), translation played a major role in the exchanges between the Arab culture and the world throughout history. It enabled to convey thoughts and words and to build bridges between the two sides. Today, translation and translators still have an important role in promoting peace and harmony between different cultures.

The annual award consists of three categories:

- The Translation Awards: include four branches: from Arabic to English, from English to Arabic, from Arabic to a second language and from the second language to Arabic. Each branch is worth $200,000 ($100,000 first place, $60,000 second place and $40,000 third place).
- The Achievement awards: up to ten branches: the translation from Arabic to 5 other languages and the translation from these 5 languages to Arabic. Each branch is worth up to $100,000.
- The International Understanding Award: worth $200,000 for a single winner, it aims at recognizing the efforts of an individual or institution in building a culture of peace and promoting international understanding.

== 2022 Edition ==
The second language for the 2022 Translation Award was Turkish. The languages for the Achievement Awards category were Romanian, Kazakh, Swahili, Bahasa Indonesia, and Vietnamese.

Category	Rank	Winner(s)	Translated book
Arabic to Turkish	First	Muḥyī al-Dīn Mājid	Tafsīr mā baʿd al-ṭabīʿah by Ibn Rushd
Arabic to Turkish	Second	Muḥammad Amīn Mashālī and Muntahā Mashālī	Rūḥ al-ḥadāthah by Taha Abderrahmane
Arabic to Turkish	Second bis.	Numan Konaklı	al-Muthaqqafūn fī al-ḥaḍārah al-ʿArabīyah by Muḥammad ʿĀbid al-Jābirī
Arabic to Turkish	Third	Osman Bayder and Özcan Akdağ	Dalālat al-ḥāʾirīn by Mūsá ibn Maymūn
Arabic to Turkish	Third bis.	Soner Duman	al-Siyāsah al-sharʿīyah fī iṣlāḥ al-rāʿī wa-al-raʿīyah by Ibn Taymiyya
Turkish to Arabic	First	Ṣalāḥ Saʿdāwī	Tārīkh fann al-khaṭṭ by Muhittin Serin
Turkish to Arabic	Third	Heval Daqmaq	Barbarī, ʿaṣrī, mutaḥaḍḍir by İbrahim Kalın
Arabic to English	Second	William Hutchins	Ibn Arabi's Small Death by Mohammed Hasan Alwan
Arabic to English	Third	Leri Price	The Walker by Samar Yazbek
English to Arabic	Second	Muḥammad ʿAbd al-Salām Ḥamshī	Populism and World Politics by David MacDonald et al.
English to Arabic	Second bis.	Ayman Ḥaddād	Gaza: An Inquest into Its Martyrdom by Norman Finkelstein
English to Arabic	Third	Muṣṭafá Muḥammad ʿAbd Allāh Qāsim	The Open Sea by Joseph Manning
English to Arabic	Third bis.	ʿĀmir Shaykhūnī	Stealing from the Saracens by Diana Darke
Dictionary		Muḥammad Manṣūr Ḥamzah	Bahasa Dictionary

=== Achievement Awards ===
Category	Winners
Achievement Award	Mehmet Hakkı Suçin; Muḥammad Ḥarb; ʿAbd Allāh Aḥmad Ibrāhīm al-ʿAzab; Burhan Köroğlu; Arab Network for Research and Publishing; İnsan Yayınları; Mana Yayınları
Achievement Awards in Languages	Romanian – Nicolae Dobrișan; Romanian – George Grigore; Kazakh – Ikhtiyar Baltore; Bahasa Indonesia – ʿAbd al-Ḥayy al-Kattānī

== 2021 ==
The second language for the Translation Award was Chinese. The languages for the Achievement Awards category were Urdu, Amharic, Greek, and Dutch.

Translation Awards

Category	Rank	Winner (s)	Translated Book
English to Arabic	Second	Mu`īn Rūmīyah	Dictionary of the Social Sciences edited by Craig Calhoun
English to Arabic	Third	Jamāl Ibrāhīm Sharaf	The American Pragmatists by Cheryl Misak
Arabic to English	Second	Ovamir Anjum	Ranks of the Divine Seekers by Ibn Qayyim al-Jawziyya
Chinese to Arabic	First	Yārā Ibrāhīm `Abd al-`Azīz al-Maṣrī	al-Ḥubb fi al-qarn al-jadīd by Can Xue
Chinese to Arabic	First bis.	Isrā’ `Abd al-Sayyid Ḥasan Muḥammad Ḥajar et.al.	Mawsū`at tārīkh al-Ṣīn edited by Zhang Qizhi
Chinese to Arabic	Third	Ḥasanayn Fahmī Ḥusayn	Thaqāfat al-ţa`ām al-Ṣīnī by Xie Dingyuan
Arabic to Chinese	First	Ge Tieying (Māhir)	al-Bukhalā` by al-Jāḥiẓ
Arabic to Chinese	Second	Wang Fu (Farīdah)	Ṭawq al Ḥamām by Rajā’ `Ālim

Achievement Awards

Category	Winners
Achievement	Li Zhenzhong (`Alī) Bayt al-Ḥikmah Group for Culture (Egypt)
Achievement Awards in Languages	Urdu - Muḥammad Ṭufayl Hāshimī; Urdu - `Abd al-Kabīr Muḥsin; Amharic - Al-Najāshī for Publishing and Distribution; Amharic - Ḥasan Tājū Legas; Greek - Persa Koumoutsi; Greek - Khālid Ra’ūf; Dutch - Richard van Leeuwen
Translation Encouragement Award	Usāma Ghawjī; Fahd Muţlaq al-`Utaybī

== 2017 ==
The second language for the Translation Award category was French. The languages for the Achievement Awards category are Japanese, Chinese, Persian, Urdu and Malay.

=== Translation Awards ===
Category	Rank	Winner(s)	Translated book
Arabic to French	First	Philippe Vigreux	La Parole Est D’or (Maqāmāt al-Hamadhānī)
Arabic to French	Second	Frédéric Lagrange	Les Basses Oeuvres (Tarmī bisharar by `Abduh Khal)
Arabic to French	Second	May A. Mahmoud	Papa Sartre (Bābā Sartre by `Alī Badr)
French to Arabic	First	Maḥmūd Ṭarshūnah	Al-Yaman al-Sa`īd and Al-Yaman al-Islāmī (Le Yémen Bienheureux and Le Yémen Islamique by Radhi Daghfous)
French to Arabic	First	Jān Mājid Jabbūr	Zaman al-Madhlūlīn (Le Temps des Humiliés by Bertrand Badie)
French to Arabic	Second	Jamāl Sheḥayyed	Al-Masarrāt wa-al-Ayyām (Les Plaisirs et les Jours by Marcel Proust)
French to Arabic	Third	Muḥmmad Ḥātimīand Muḥmmad Jādūr	Al-Uṣūl al-Ijtimā`īyah wa-al- Thaqāfīyah lil Waṭanīyah al-Maghribīyah (Les origines sociales et culturelles du nationalisme marocain by Abdallah Laroui)
French to Arabic	Third	Aḥmad al-Ṣādiqī	Ibn `Arabī, Sīratuhu wa Fikruhu (Ibn ‘Arabi ou La Quête du Soufre Rouge by Claude Addas)
Arabic to English	First	Paul Starkey	The Shell (Al-Qawqa`ah by Muṣṭafá Khalīfah)
Arabic to English	First	Katharine Halls and Adam Talib	The Dove’s Necklace (Ṭawq al-Ḥamām by Rajā’ `Ālim)
Arabic to English	Second	Jibrīl Fu’ād Ḥaddād	The Lights of Revelation and the Secrets of Interpretation (Anwār al-Tanzīl fī Asrār al-ta’wīl by Al-Bayḍāwī)
English to Arabic	First	Mujāb Al-Imām and Mu`īn Al-Imām	Uṣūl al-Niẓām al-Siyāsī and al-Niẓām al-Siyāsī wa al-Inḥiṭāṭ al-Siyāsī (The Origins of Political Order and Political Order and Political Decay by Francis Fukuyama)
English to Arabic	Second	Yūsūf Bin `Uthmān	Dirāsāt Niūtūnīyah (Newtonian Studies by Alexandre Koyré)
English to Arabic	Third	Ḥamzah Bin Qabalān	Ayyu Naw`in Mina al-Makhlūqāt Naḥnu? (What Kind of Creatures Are We? by Noam Chomsky)

=== Achievement Awards ===
Category	Winners
Achievement Award for the French language	Sindbad Publishers – Arles, France
Translation and Dictionaries Studies	Īsá Mammīshī Muḥammad Dīdāwī Ḥasan Sa`īd Ghazālah
Achievement Awards in Eastern Languages (Chinese, Persian, Japanese, Malay, Urdu)	`Abd al-Jabbār al-Rifā`ī Xue Qing Guo (Bassām) Muḥammad al-Sa`īd Jamāl al-Dīn `Abd al-`Azīz Ḥamdī `Abd al-`Azīz Ḥafiẓ Ikrām-ul-Ḥaqq Jalāl al-Sa`īd al-Hifnāwī Encyclopaedia Islamica Foundation - Tehran

== 2016 Edition ==
The second language for 2016 was Spanish.

Category	Rank	Winner(s)	Translated book
Arabic to English	First	Michael Cooperson	Virtues of the Imām Aḥmad ibn Ḥanbal by Ibn al-Jawzī
Arabic to Spanish	First	Salvador Peña Martín	Mil y una noches in four volumes
Arabic to Spanish	Second	Ignacio Ferrando	Azazel by Youssef Ziedan
Arabic to Spanish	Third	Mahmud Sobh	El diván de la poesía Árabe oriental y Andalusí
English to Arabic	First	Murād Tadghūt	Arabic Manuscripts: A Vademecum for Readers by Adam Gacek
English to Arabic	Second	Ḥasan Ḥilmī	The Cantos of Ezra Pound (selections) and Personae: Collected Shorter Poems (selections)
English to Arabic	Third	Muṣṭafa Muḥammad `abd Allah Qāsim	Constantinople: City of the World's Desire 1453-1924 by Philip Mansel
Spanish to Arabic	First	Saleh Almani	Diez mujeres by Marcela Serrano
Spanish to Arabic	Second	Sulaymān Al `aṭṭār	El ingenioso hidalgo don Quijote de la Mancha
Spanish to Arabic	Third	`alī Ibrāhīm Menūfī	Hatshapsut: de reina a Faraón de Egipto by Teresa Bedman and Francisco J. Martín Valentín
Achievement Award		Casa Árabe, Madrid, Córdoba, Spain	
Achievement Award		Banipal Publishing, London, UK	
Achievement Award		Ibn Tufayl Foundation for Arabic Studies, Almería, Spain	

== 2015 Edition ==
The second language for 2017 was Turkish.

Category	Rank	Winner(s)	Translated book
Arabic to English	First	Geert Jan van GelderGregor Schoeler	Epistle of Forgiveness by Al-Ma`arrī
Arabic to English	Second	Imran Ahsan Khan Nyazee	The Reconciliation of the Fundamentals of Islamic Law by al-Shāṭibī
Arabic to English	Second	Issa Boullata	The Unique Necklace by Ibn `Abd Rabbihi
Arabic to English	Third	Ferial GhazoulJohn Verlenden	Chronicles of Majnun Layla and Selected Poems
Arabic to Turkish	First	Muhammet Ҫelik	al-`aql al-akhlāqī al-`Arabī by Muḥammad `Ābid al-Jābirī
Arabic to Turkish	Second	Osman Guman	Dalā’il al-i`jāz by `Abd al-Qāhir al-Jurjānī
Arabic to Turkish	Third	Ömer Türker	Sharḥ al-mawāqif by al-Sharīf al-Jurjānī
English to Arabic	First	Imām `Abd al-Fattāḥ Imām	Multicultural Odysseys by Will Kymlicka
English to Arabic	Second	Fāyiz Ṣuyyāgh	The Age of Extremes by Eric Hobsbawm
English to Arabic	Third	Aḥmad Sālim Sālim `Alī `Īsā	A History of Egypt in the Middle Ages by Stanley Lane-Poole
English to Arabic	Third	Aḥmad Ḥasan al-Ma`īnī	The Persians: Ancient, Mediaeval and Modern Iran by Homa Katouzian
Turkish to Arabic	First	Fazel Bayat	al-Bilād al-`Arabīyah fī al-wathā’iq al-`Uthmānīyah (four volumes)
Turkish to Arabic	Second	`Abd al-Qādir `Abdallī	Huzur by Ahmet Hamdi Tanpinar
Turkish to Arabic	Third	Ṣafwān Shalabī	La wujūd limāyud`ā bilghad (Collection of Turkish short stories)
Achievement Award		The Arab Organization for Translation (Al-Munaẓẓamah al-`Arabīyah li-al-Tarjamah)	
