= Urwa ibn al-Zubayr =

Muslim jurist and scholar (c. 644–713)

- عُرْوَة بْن الزُّبَيْر

Personal life
- Born: 23 AH (643/644 CE)
- Died: 94 AH (712/713 CE)
- Spouse: Fakhtah bint al-Aswad ibn Abi al-Bakhtari; Umm Yahya bint Al-Hakam ibn Abi al-As; Asma bint Salama ibn Umar ibn Abi Salama; Sawdah bint Abd Allah ibn Umar ibn al-Khattab; Unnamed bint Asmifa ibn Wa'la ibn Ya'fur
- Children: Abd Allah; Umar; al-Aswad; Yahya; Muhammad; Uthman; Abu Bakr; Hisham; Ubayd Allah; Mus'ab; Umm Kulthum; Aisha al-Kubra; Umm Umar; Aisha al-Sughra; Khadija; Asma
- Parents: Zubayr ibn al-Awwam (father); Asma bint Abi Bakr (mother)
- Era: Rashidun Caliphate; Umayyad Caliphate
- Relatives: Abd Allah ibn al-Zubayr (brother); Mus'ab ibn al-Zubayr (brother); Amr ibn al-Zubayr (brother); Aisha (aunt); Marwan ibn al-Hakam (brother-in-law); Abd al-Malik ibn Marwan (nephew-in-law)

Religious life
- Religion: Islam
- Profession: Hadith scholar, mufassir, jurist (Tabi'i)

Urwa ibn al-Zubayr ibn al-Awwam al-Asadi (Arabic: عُرْوَة بْن الزُّبَيْر بْن الْعَوَّام الأَسَدِيّ, romanized: ʿUrwa ibn al-Zubayr ibn al-ʿAwwām al-ʾAsadī; c. 644–713) was an early Muslim traditionist, widely regarded as a founding figure in the field of historical study among the Muslims. He was a son of Muhammad's close aide Zubayr ibn al-Awwam, and a nephew of his wife A'isha. He spent much of his life in Medina, witnessed the First Fitna (656–661) as a youth, and supported his elder brother Abd Allah ibn al-Zubayr in his failed attempt to establish his caliphate in the Second Fitna (680–692). After Abd Allah's elimination by his Syria-based Umayyad rivals, Urwa reconciled with the Umayyads, whom he paid occasional visits and maintained a literary correspondence with.

Urwa's relations with important early Islamic figures gave him access to first-hand accounts on the early Islamic period, which he collected from his father, his aunt, and a number of companions of Muhammad, passing these on to his students, above all his son Hisham and Ibn Shihab al-Zuhri, as well as Abu al-Aswad Muhammad ibn Abd al-Rahman (d. 132/750). A large number of these traditions are reported in the hadith and historical literature. Some of his literary correspondences with the Umayyad caliphs Abd al-Malik ibn Marwan (r. 685–705), who was his nephew-in-law via his marriage to Umm Yahya bint Al-Hakam ibn Abi al-As, and al-Walid I (r. 705–715) have also been reported in historical works. Combined, they cover almost all important events of Muhammad's prophetic career as well as early caliphate, and are central to the historical study of Muhammad. Modern Western historians have debated the authenticity of the Urwa corpus of traditions. Some hold that most of the traditions reported on his authority did indeed originate with him and the core of the information contained therein is genuine, although they have been modified and colored by later transmitters to some extent. On the other hand, some hold that much of the corpus is later, retrospective attribution to Urwa.

== Biography ==
Sources differ on Urwa's birth year, placing it in 22, 23, 26, or 29 AH. 23 AH, corresponding to 643/644 CE, is most likely. His father was Zubayr ibn al-Awwam, a senior companion of the Islamic prophet Muhammad, and his mother was Asma, a daughter of the first caliph Abu Bakr (r. 632–634) and sister of Muhammad's wife A'isha. Abd Allah ibn al-Zubayr, the counter-caliph of the Second Fitna, was his full brother.

Urwa spent his early life in Medina, during the caliphate of the third caliph Uthman (r. 644–656). After Uthman's assassination, he accompanied his father, brother, and his aunt A'isha to the southern Iraqi town of Basra, where the three elders fought against the fourth caliph Ali (r. 656–661). Urwa was not allowed to participate in the fight due to his young age. His father was killed in the battle and Urwa returned to Medina with his aunt. His father's considerable fortune enabled Urwa to concentrate on studies, and he began collecting and studying reports on the earlier period of Islam. His main informant was A'isha. It is unclear exactly when he started the activity, but he is reported to have held regular sessions of study with his friends in the Prophet's Mosque of Medina during the later years of the reign of Mu'awiya I (r. 661–680), the first caliph of the Umayyad Caliphate, which succeeded the earlier Medina-based Rashidun Caliphate after the First Fitna (656–661). The group included among others, his half-brother Mus'ab and the future caliph Abd al-Malik ibn Marwan, since Urwa was married to Abd al-Malik's paternal aunt, Umm Yahya bint Al-Hakam ibn Abi al-As, this made Urwa the uncle-in-law of Abd al-Malik. Arab historian al-Baladhuri (d. 892) narrates a report from Urwa that he spent seven years in Egypt, which according to the historian Joseph Horovitz would fall between 678 and 685, and married there. The historian Gregor Schoeler considers it unlikely that he spent seven continuous years in Egypt.

During the peak of the Second Fitna, Urwa's elder brother Abd Allah controlled much of Western Arabia, including the Islamic holy cities of Mecca and Medina.

In the Second Fitna (680–692), his elder brother Abd Allah established his counter-caliphate in opposition to the Umayyads, and Urwa supported him. (Note: Charles Pellat and Abd al-Aziz Duri hold that he played no part in politics.) When the Umayyad general al-Hajjaj ibn Yusuf besieged Mecca in 692 to overthrow Abd Allah, Urwa is reported to have negotiated Abd Allah's surrender with al-Hajjaj, who agreed to grant him safety. Abd Allah ultimately decided to die fighting; al-Hajjaj struck his body on a cross. Urwa escaped al-Hajjaj to Medina, where he deposited the wealth of the Zubayrid family, and then rode to Caliph Abd al-Malik (r. 685–705) in Damascus, the capital of the Umayyads, informing him of Abd Allah's death even before al-Hajjaj's messenger could reach him. The Caliph treated him with respect and granted his request to retrieve Abd Allah's body. Urwa returned to Mecca to bury Abd Allah and offered funeral prayers over him. The sources do not mention any further Damascus visits by Urwa in Abd al-Malik's time, but the two maintained correspondence, as Abd Al-Malik would consult him on the events of early Islamic period.

After the end of the civil war, Urwa settled in Medina and continued his scholarly activity. After Abd al-Malik's death in 705, Urwa traveled to Damascus to give his allegiance to the new caliph al-Walid I (r. 705–715). During this stay, Urwa's son Muhammad died in an accident, while Urwa himself suffered from gangrene in one of his feet, which had to be amputated. In 706, he was appointed to the newly established ten-member council of fuqaha (jurists) by the then governor of Medina, Umar ibn Abd al-Aziz. The council was tasked to advise the governor on legal matters. Urwa died on his estate near Rabadha, which lay 200 km east of Medina, and was buried there. The year of his death is given variously between 93 AH and 101 AH, the most likely being 94 AH, which corresponds to 712/713 CE.

The sources describe Urwa as a person with upright character who avoided discord and lived a pious life. He is regarded as one of the 'Seven Fuqaha of Medina'. They were, according to the sources, the most prominent of a number of Medinan jurists who played a significant part in the development of the Medinan school of fiqh (Islamic jurisprudence). In the view of Joseph Schacht, a scholar of Islamic Law, none of them actually held to the legal doctrines of the Medinan school, since the doctrines developed only later and were ascribed to them in retrospect. Urwa is reported to have written books on law, but these have not survived. According to a report by his son Hisham (d. 763/764), Urwa destroyed them on the day of the Battle of al-Harra (August 683), (Note: One variant suggests that they rather got burnt in the subsequent pillage of the town.) when the army of the second Umayyad caliph Yazid I (r. 680–683) stormed Medina to quell the rebellion there. The scholars of the early period of Islam would write books for private use, destroying them before their deaths out of fear that they might fall into others' hands and compete with the Qur'an. Urwa destroyed the books anticipating his death in the battle. He later used to express deep regret for this loss.

== Transmission of historical material ==
Urwa serves as a source for two types of materials on the early Islamic period: hadith and letters. His situation in an important early Islamic family enabled him to obtain first hand information on the period. He would gather accounts from his father, mother, as well as his aunt, but also reported from other authorities such as Abd Allah ibn Abbas, Abu Hurayra, Abd Allah ibn Amr ibn al-As, Usama ibn Zayd, and Abu Dharr al-Ghifari. (Note: A broader list of his authorities reported by Ibn Sa'd includes Zayd ibn Thabit, Abu Ayyub al-Ansari, Nu'man ibn Bashir, Mu'awiya, Abd Allah ibn Umar, and Marwan ibn al-Hakam.)

=== Hadith ===
Urwa narrated a number of hadiths (traditions about the sayings and deeds attributed to Muhammad as well as early Muslims) which are transmitted through his son Hisham and his student Ibn Shihab al-Zuhri (d. 742). These have been reported in hadith collections—Musnad of Ibn Hanbal (d. 855), and the canonical compilations of al-Bukhari (d. 870) and Muslim (d. 875) among others—legal works like Muwatta of Malik ibn Anas (d. 795), historical works (Ibn Ishaq, al-Tabari, al-Baladhuri), and the exegetical works (e.g. Tafsir al-Tabari). The hadiths cover all events of significance on early Islam, but his reports concerning the life of Muhammad are of central importance. According to Schoeler, these are taken as the starting point for any historical study of Muhammad's life. They include subjects like the beginning of Muhammad's prophecy, Meccan persecution, the emigration of the Muslims to Medina (hijra), campaigns against the Jewish tribes of Qaynuqa and Qurayza, the battles of the Trench and Hunayn, the treaty of al-Hudaybiya, Muhammad's letters to various people, as well as his last days. He also narrated short reports on the Rashidun period such as the Ridda wars, campaigns in Syria, the claims of Abbas, Fatima, and Muhammad's wives to his inheritance, battles of the Yarmuk, Qadisiyya, and of the Camel, and Umar's journey to Jerusalem. However, some of these are no more than passing references.

In addition to historical data, he transmitted hadiths on legal issues concerning laws (such as those on property, marriage, divorce, the status of women and slaves) and rituals, such as ablution, prayer, and pilgrimage. Many of his transmitted hadiths give explanations for various Qur'anic passages and provide historical background to their origin. This would later become a standard practice in Qur'anic exegesis to explain verses in terms of Muhammad's life.

In the traditional Muslim hadith criticism, Urwa is considered a trustworthy transmitter and is praised for his piety and depth of his knowledge. In some of his hadith narrations, Urwa did not specify the authorities from whom he got these traditions (isnad), whereas in others, his isnads do not fulfil the requirements of isnad criticism as they developed later on. In his day, the use of isnad was somewhat customary but was nevertheless flexible, and rules of isnad reliability had not yet fully developed (e.g. it was not required to stretch the isnad back to a companion of Muhammad). Two-thirds of his hadiths are transmitted on the authority of A'isha, although in some of these isnads her name might have been inserted later. The historian Montgomery Watt assumes that all of the isnads in his traditions that go beyond him are likely later insertions based on conjecture, which may or may not be correct. In some reports, his sources were written documents, such as Muhammad's letter to the residents of the East Arabian town of Hajar.

=== Written sources ===
Excerpts from Urwa's letter to Abd al-Malik concerning the battle of Badr, as reported by al-Tabari

You have written to me asking about Abū Sufyān and the circumstances of his expedition. Abū Sufyān b. Ḥarb came from Syria at the head of nearly seventy horsemen from all the clans of Quraysh. They had been trading in Syria and they all came together with their money and their merchandise. The Messenger of God and his companions were informed about them [...] The Muslims set out with no other object than Abū Sufyān and the horsemen with him. They did not think that these were anything but (easy) booty and did not suppose that there would be a great battle when they met them. It is concerning this that God revealed, "And ye longed that other than the armed one might be yours."[Qur'an 8:7]

Urwa's letters to the caliphs Abd al-Malik and al-Walid, which he wrote in response to their queries, have been reported to the fullest in the History and the Tafsir of al-Tabari (d. 923), although to a lesser extent also in earlier works of Ibn Ishaq (d. 767), al-Waqidi (d. 823), Ibn Sa'd (d. 844/845), Ibn Hanbal, and Umar ibn Shabba (d. 875), which contain excerpts and references to these letters. Some letters, however, only appear in al-Tabari's works. The letters have not survived in the documentary form nor has their exact wording been preserved, due to the process of oral transmission. Nine letters in total have been reported through three different chains of transmission from Hisham, al-Zuhri, and Abu al-Zinad, a mawla (freedman) of the family of Caliph Uthman. However, not all are transmitted through each of these isnads. The letters contain accounts of the Meccan persecution, hijra to Abyssinia (Ethiopian Empire) and Medina, the battles of Badr and Hunayn, treaty of al-Hudaybiya, conquest of Mecca, and calumniation of A'isha.

Later authors attribute to Urwa books on the military campaigns of Muhammad (Kitab al-Maghazi). Abu al-Aswad Muhammad ibn Abd al-Rahman, an Egyptian orphan Urwa is said to have raised during his stay there, allegedly compiled into such a book traditions he had collected from Urwa. A 9th-century scholar from Baghdad, Abu Hassan al-Ziyadi, also compiled a now lost Maghazi of Urwa. Anthony and Schoeler claim that both attributions to Urwa are spurious and that it is almost certain he did not write a Maghazi book. According to Cook, during his day, dissemination of traditions through writings was frowned upon and he most likely relied upon oral transmission, which was the preferred medium of transmission of traditions at the time. He did write down some of the hadiths he taught, but these were mainly written as notes for topically arranging his hadith lectures and not as a book.

== Assessment ==
=== Authenticity ===
The authenticity of the traditions transmitted by Urwa concerns two questions. First, whether the vast number of traditions attributed to him can actually be traced back to him. Second, whether the material reported by him is indeed authentic. According to the Islamicist Andreas Goerke and Schoeler, the majority of the hadiths attributed to Urwa do go back to him, although some appear to be spurious. The textual analysis of the traditions transmitted by both Hisham and al-Zuhri, which differ considerably in wording and detail but share the same overall structure, reveals that most of them were indeed transmitted independently of each other and come from the same source (i.e. Urwa). On the reliability of information that indeed goes back to Urwa, Schoeler states that it is possible that some of the information Urwa received from his authorities was distorted due to bias and memory lapse, but it is unlikely that any of that material was invented or distorted beyond recognition. Nor is it likely that the reports were distorted by Urwa himself. The information on Muhammad's life, at least for the Medinan period, as derived from Urwa, is thus largely reliable.

Analyzing the al-Hudaybiya traditions attributed to Urwa, Goerke concluded that his version is the oldest of all, and has been redacted over the long transmission process. In the first step, Urwa himself combined various eyewitness reports available to him, not all of which necessarily belonged to the same event. He orally transmitted that synthesized version to Hisham and al-Zuhri, who in turn transmitted it independently of each other. The original core of the tradition going back to Urwa likely consisted of three points: a treaty between Muhammad and the Quraysh tribe; a clause requiring extradition back to Mecca of any Meccan fugitives to Medina; and actual extradition of certain individuals. Al-Zuhri's version was committed to writing significantly later than Hisham's and suffered alterations during transmission. In particular, the incident of bay'at al-shajara and the revelation of the entire Sura 48 of the Qur'an on this occasion were added later. Similarly, Goerke and Schoeler concluded that the core of the hijra traditions—the harassment of the Muslims in Mecca, hijra to Abyssinia, general hijra to Medina followed by Muhammad and Abu Bakr's journey to the city—indeed goes back to Urwa. The specific details may or may not be from Urwa himself.

Professor Stephen Shoemaker has contested the conclusions of Goerke and Schoeler, arguing that only for a few elements of these traditions can a secure connection with Urwa be established, with a majority of them going back to al-Zuhri at most. Shoemaker suspects that Urwa's reputation as an authority on Muhammad's life might have resulted in attribution to him of many traditions that were previously unassigned to any authority.

Modern historians of early Islam have held Urwa's letters to be largely genuine. Early on, Leone Caetani and Horovitz endorsed their authenticity. According to the latter, even though Urwa does not name his sources, they undoubtedly come from the traditions he collected. Similarly, Watt considered the letter concerning the hijra genuine, even though it has anti-Umayyad bias due to the history of Zubayrid-Umayyad hostility. Schoeler, likewise, regards the letters as authentic, allowing for the possibility of changes in the course of transmission. Shoemaker has cast doubt on the authenticity of the letters, especially those reported only by al-Tabari. Although not entirely excluding the possibility of the letters' origin with Urwa, he argues that the very limited attestation of the letters in the sources warrants same skepticism towards them, as to hadith traditions in general. Given the widespread phenomena of forged epistles in the period concerned, it is possible that the letters were fabricated after Urwa's death. According to the historian Sean Anthony, on the other hand, the internal features of the most of these letters imply they are largely authentic. They are consistent with the image of the Umayyads and Zubayrids that emerges from other sources, are lacking any hagiographic and miraculous stories, and fit well in the context of Umayyad-Zubayrid reconciliation. The lack of any mention of Ali in these letters, towards whom these both families were hostile, adds further weight to their authenticity.

=== Founder of Islamic historiography ===
Based on the accounts that are narrated on his authority in the works of Ibn Ishaq and others, the Arabist Alfred Guillaume calls him the "founder of Islamic history". Schoeler considers his letters "the beginning of Islamic historiography", whereas Horovitz and professor Fuat Sezgin consider them the oldest surviving written records on the life of Muhammad and the oldest Arabic historical prose. (Note: Aban ibn Uthman likely wrote some materials concerning Muhammad's life before Urwa, but they have not survived.) The Islamicist Fred Donner states that since the later sources attribute written books to Urwa and no earlier authorities, it seems to imply that he was the first to systematically collect and write down individual traditions. To professor Abd al-Aziz Duri, Urwa laid the foundation of historical study among the Muslims that was then taken up by later generations. To the historian Chase F. Robinson on the contrary, he was a storyteller who "took some interest in the past" and perhaps taught about it, but not really a historian.

== Sources ==
- Anthony, Sean (2020). Muhammad and the Empires of Faith: The Making of the Prophet of Islam. Oakland, California: University of California Press. ISBN 9780520340411.
- Bewley, Aisha (2000). The Men of Madina - Volume II [An abridged translation of Ibn Sa'd's Kitab al-Tabaqat al-Kabir, Volume 5]. London: Ta-Ha Publishers. ISBN 1-897940-91-2.
- Cook, Michael (1997). "The Opponents of the Writing of Tradition in Early Islam". Arabica. 44 (4): 437–530. doi:10.1163/1570058972582317. JSTOR 4057289.
- Donner, Fred M. (1998). Narratives of Islamic Origins: The Beginnings of Islamic Historical Writing. Princeton: Darwin Press. ISBN 0-87850-127-4.
- Duri, A. A. (1983) [1960]. Conrad, Lawrence (ed.). The Rise of Historical Writing Among the Arabs. Princeton: Princeton University Press. ISBN 0-691-05388-X.
- Goerke, Andreas (2000). "The Historical Tradition about al-Ḥudaybiya: A Study of ʿUrwa B. al-Zubayr's Account". In Motzki, Harald (ed.). The Biography of Muḥammad: The Issue of the Sources. Leiden: Brill. pp. 240–275. ISBN 978-90-04-11513-2.
- Goerke, Andreas; Schoeler, Gregor (2005). "Reconstructing the Earliest sīra Texts: the Hiğra in the Corpus of ʿUrwa b. al-Zubayr". Der Islam. 82 (2): 200–220. doi:10.1515/islm.2005.82.2.209. S2CID 160926592.
- Guillaume, Alfred (1998) [1955]. The Life of Muhammad: A Translation of Isḥāq's Sīrat Rasūl Allāh. Karachi: Oxford University Press. ISBN 0-19-636033-1.
- Horovitz, Joseph (2002) [1927-1928]. Conrad, Lawrence (ed.). The Earliest Biographies of the Prophet and Their Authors. Princeton: Darwin Press. ISBN 0-87850-118-5.
- McDonald, M.V., ed. (1987). The History of al-Ṭabarī, Volume VII: The Foundation of the Community: Muḥammad at Madina, A.D. 622–626. SUNY Series in Near Eastern Studies. Albany, New York: State University of New York Press. ISBN 978-0-88706-344-2.
- Pellat, Charles (2004). "Fuḳahāʾ al-Madīna al-Sabʿa". In Bearman, P. J.; Bianquis, Th.; Bosworth, C. E.; van Donzel, E. & Heinrichs, W. P. (eds.). The Encyclopaedia of Islam, Second Edition. Volume XII: Supplement. Leiden: E. J. Brill. pp. 310–312. ISBN 978-90-04-13974-9.
- Robinson, Chase F. (2003). Islamic Historiography. Cambridge: Cambridge University Press. ISBN 0-521-62081-3.
- Schacht, Joseph (1982) [1964]. An Introduction to Islamic Law. Oxford: Oxford University Press. ISBN 0-19-825473-3.
- Schoeler, Gregor (2000). "ʿUrwa b. al-Zubayr". In Bearman, P. J.; Bianquis, Th.; Bosworth, C. E.; van Donzel, E. & Heinrichs, W. P. (eds.). The Encyclopaedia of Islam, Second Edition. Volume X: T–U. Leiden: E. J. Brill. pp. 910–913. ISBN 978-90-04-11211-7.
- Sezgin, Fuat (1967). Geschichte des arabischen Schrifttum (in German). Vol. 1: Qurʾānwissenschaften, Ḥadīṯ, Geschichte, Fiqh, Dogmatik, Mystik. Bis ca. 430 H. Leiden: E. J. Brill.
- Shoemaker, Stephen J. (2011). "In Search of ʿUrwa's Sīra: Some Methodological Issues in the Quest for 'Authenticity' in the Life of Muḥammad". Der Islam. 85 (2): 257–344. doi:10.1515/ISLAM.2011.006. S2CID 144794999.
- Watt, W. Montgomery (1960) [1953]. Muhammad at Mecca. London: Clarendon Press.
