= The Theocrat =

Book by Bensalem Himmich

- Author: Bensalem Himmich (1948-Present)
- Translator: Roger Allen
- Language: AR/EN (Trans.)
- Published: 1990
- Publisher: Dar Al-Shorouk Publishing
- Publication place: Cairo, Egypt

The Theocrat is the 1990 novel by the Moroccan author and former minister of culture Bensalem Himmich. It was published by Dar Al-Shorouk publishing, and it was considered one of the most influential Arabic novels due to its centering old Arab history. In his novel, Himmich revives the character of al-Hakim bi-Amr Illah ("the ruler by order of God"), the Fatimid caliph who ruled Egypt during the tenth century. The Arab Writers Union considered is among the most important 105 novels of the 20th century. Additionally, it also enjoys a high status among historical Arabic fiction, for the novel takes inspiration from facts, events, and historical personalities.

== English translation ==
The Theocrat was translated into English by the comparative and Arabic Literature professor at Pennsylvania University, Roger Allen, after taking a liking to it and recognizing its value. He said, "it is a novel revealing the highest level of culture, and his narrative style aligns with the techniques of writing." He was particularly interested in the author's ability to connect past and present, which prompted him to translate the novel into English. He clarified that this new edition also connects past and present, with some mild differences that do not affect its core. He also mentioned that this is one of the Arabic novels raising awareness regarding the importance of dismantling fascism.

== Criticism ==
The novel was critiqued by the judging panel and given the "Naqid" or "Critique" Award. The panel mentioned the author's attempt at processing and critiquing the present based on the judgment of al-Hakim bi-Amr Illah, not abiding by the traditional majority of historical novels; therefore, limiting fictional tension between fictional imagery and storylines. This infused the novel with historic-ness, for he made the subject, style, and structure a complete artistic work. One of its perks is its ability to benefit from oral storytelling, which is linguistically, historically, psychologically, and socially rich.
