= Al-Ba'uni =

Al-Bā'ūnī is an Arabic family name (or nisba) most famously denoting the prominent dynasty of scholars and jurists descending from Nāṣir b. Khalīfa b. Faradj al-Nāṣirī al-Bā'unī al-Shāfi'ī, who began life as a weaver in the village of Bā'ūn (or Bā'ūna) in Hauran. Leaving around 750/1349 for Nazareth, Nāṣir had the following prominent descendants before the dynasty disappears from the historical record:

- Nāṣir
  - Ismā'īl (who became a sufi and deputy qadi in Nazareth)
  - Aḥmad (b. Nazareth c. 751/1350, d. Damascus 816/1413). He 'was at various times the Friday preacher at the al-Aqṣá Mosque in Jerusalem, the Friday preacher at the Umayyad Mosque in Damascus, the Shafi‘i judge of Damascus and, for two months, of Egypt, as well'. Aḥmad became shaykh al-shuyūkh under Sultan Barqūq (r. 784–801/1382–99), 'but he fell from royal grace for refusing to lend the sultan funds from religious endowments. Aḥmad wrote a commentary on the Quran and a poem on proper religious belief, and was considered an excellent preacher'.
    - Ibrāhīm (b. Safed 777/1375, d. Damascus 870/1464×65; inter alia, deputy qadi of Damascus; khatib of the Umayyad Mosque and the Al-Aqsa Mosque; nāẓir al-ḥaramayn (supervisor of the Muslim holy places of Jerusalem and Hebron); and teacher of Al-Sakhawi). 'His fine literary abilities won him the title "Master of Literature in the Land of Syria".'
    - Muḥammad (b. Damascus 780/1378, d. Damascus 871/1466; khatib of the Umayyad Mosque)
    - Yūsuf (b. Jerusalem 805/1402, d. Damascus 880/1475; qadi in Safed, Tripoli, Aleppo, and Damascus, 'fondly remembered as one of the best Shafi‘i judges of Damascus') Yusuf had at least five sons. His most prominent children were:
      - 'A'isha (b. Damascus, d. Damascus 922/1516; possibly the most prolific female writer of the Middle Ages)
      - Aḥmad (d. 910/1505; poet)
      - Muḥammad (d. 916/1510; poet)

The family is noted for its interest in Islamic mysticism and Sufism; 'many members of the Bū'ūnī family ... were buried in a family plot adjacent to the zāwiyah of the Sufi master Abū Bakr ibn Dūwūd (d. 806/1403). This strongly suggests their attachment to this Sufi and his descendants, who were affiliated with the Urmawī branch of the Qādirīyah order'. Several of the family's female members, including 'A'isha al-Ba'uniyya, married members of another prominent Damascus family, Ibn Naqīb al-Ashrāf, who were noted for being descendants of Muhammad.
