= Gregor Schoeler =

German–born Swiss Arabist and Islamicist

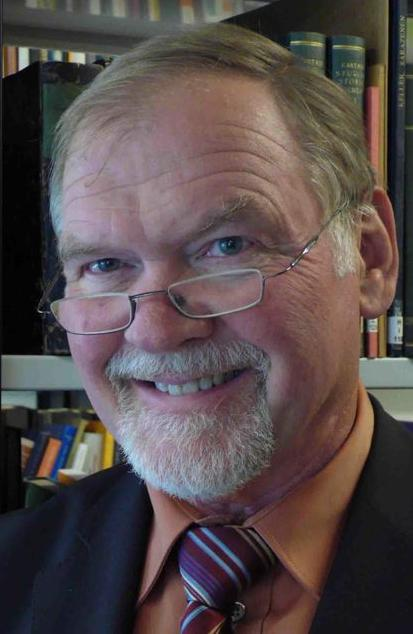
Gregor Schoeler

Gregor Schoeler (born 27 July 1944 in Waldshut, Germany) is an Arabist and Islamicist with German and Swiss citizenship. His areas of research are the biography (Sīrah) of Muhammad, the Islamic system of teaching and transmission, Hadith, classical Arabic and Persian literature, especially Arabic poetry, belles-lettres and literary theory, the description of Arabic manuscripts and the classical heritage in Islam. In his research on the biography of Muhammad, he used individual examples to reconstruct the ways in which the accounts of Muhammad were transmitted, and showed that many of these accounts can be traced back to Urwa ibn al-Zubayr (d. 712/13), the nephew of Muhammad's wife ʿĀ'isha bint Abī Bakr. He also helped develop the method of isnād-cum-matn analysis.

== Life ==
Gregor Schoeler graduated from the Scheffel-Gymnasium in Bad Säckingen (Germany) in 1963. He first studied German and Romance studies, Philosophy and Semitic studies at the University of Marburg, the latter with Otto Rössler, and later Islamic Studies and Semitic Studies at the Goethe University Frankfurt and University of Giessen. He received his doctorate in Islamic Studies in Giessen in 1972; his doctoral supervisor was Ewald Wagner. From 1972 to 1973 and from 1975 to 1978 he worked as a research assistant on a project on the poet Abu Nuwas funded by the German Research Foundation (DFG); from 1973 to 1974 he was an assistant at the Orient-Institut Beirut, which at that time was still maintained by the Deutsche Morgenländische Gesellschaft. From 1978 to 1980 he was engaged as a research assistant in the DFG-funded project for the cataloguing of oriental manuscripts in Germany. In 1980 he became a university assistant at the University of Giessen, and in 1981 he completed his habilitation in Giessen.

In 1982, Schoeler was appointed professor at the University of Basel, where he held the Chair of Islamic Studies until his retirement in 2009, and was head of the Oriental Seminar. From 1993 to 2010 he was co-editor of the Swiss journal Asiatische Studien/Etudes Asiatiques. In the spring of 2000, he was a visiting professor at the École pratique des hautes études in Paris, and in March 2010 he was a Messenger Lecturer at Cornell University. Shawkat Toorawa, professor of Arabic literature at Yale University, praised him on this occasion as "may be the most significant scholar of early Islam".

His most well known work is the collected series of lectures known as Écrire et transmettre dans les débuts de l'islam, which is available in French, English and Arabic.

Gregor Schoeler is married to the graduate psychologist Christa Schoeler (born 1943) and has two children: the social pedagogue Benedikt Schoeler (born 1980) and the actress and stage director Livia Schoeler (born 1982).

== Awards ==
- In 2006, Schoeler was awarded the Prix Delalande-Guérineau by the Académie des Inscriptions et Belles-Lettres at the Institut de France for his book Ecrire et transmettre dans les débuts de l'Islam.
- In 2012 he received the "World Prize for the Book of the Year" of the Islamic Republic of Iran for his book The biography of Muḥammad: nature and authenticity.
- In 2015, together with Geert Jan van Gelder, he received the Sheikh Hamad Award for Translation and International Understanding for the edition and translation of Abū l-ʿAlāʾ al-Maʿarrī’s Risālat al-Ghufrān (Epistle of Forgiveness).

== Publications in chronological order ==
- Arabische Naturdichtung. Die Zahrīyāt, Rabʿ̄īyāt und Rauḍīyāt von ihren Anfängen bis Aṣ-Ṣanaubarī. Eine gattungs-, motiv- und stilgeschichtliche Untersuchung. Steiner u. a., Wiesbaden u. a. 1974, ISBN 3-515-01838-7 (Beiruter Texte und Studien 15), (Revised version of the PhD dissertation).
- Einige Grundprobleme der autochthonen und aristotelischen arabischen Literaturtheorie. Ḥāzim al-Qarṭāğannīs Kapitel über die Zielsetzungen der Dichtung und die Vorgeschichte der in ihm dargelegten Gedanken. Steiner, Wiesbaden 1975, ISBN 3-515-01966-9 (Abhandlungen für die Kunde des Morgenlandes 41, 4).
- Der Dīwān des Abū Nuwās, Teil IV, Wiesbaden 1982.
- „Mündliche Thora und Ḥadīth im Islam. Überlieferung, Schreibverbot, Redaktion“, in: Der Islam 66 (1989) 213-251. - Engl. translation in „Oral Torah and Ḥadīth: Transmission, Prohibition of Writing, Redaction“, in: Harald Motzki (ed.): Hadith. Origins and Development. Ashgate Publishing, Aldershot/Burlington 2004, p. 67–108.
- Arabische Handschriften, Teil II (= Verzeichnis der orientalischen Handschriften in Deutschland XVII B2). Franz Steiner, Stuttgart 1990. Online version
- Charakter und Authentie der muslimischen Überlieferung über das Leben Mohammeds. De Gruyter, Berlin u. a. 1996, ISBN 3-11-014862-5 (Studien zur Sprache, Geschichte und Kultur des islamischen Orients NF 14). – Engl. translation as The Biography of Muhammad: Nature and Authenticity, translated by U. Vagelpohl, ed. by J. E. Montgomery, London, New York 2011. ISBN 9780415567176
- Abū l-ʿAlāʾ al-Maʿarrī: Paradies und Hölle. Die Jenseitsreise aus dem „Sendschreiben über die Vergebung“. Aus dem Arabischen übersetzt und herausgegeben. C. H. Beck, München 2002, ISBN 3-406-48446-8.
- Ecrire et transmettre dans les débuts de l'islam. Paris 2002.
- The Oral and the Written in Early Islam translated by U. Vagelpohl, edited by J. E. Montgomery. Routledge, London, New York 2006. Collection of six essays translated into English, five of which previously appeared in Der Islam. C
- Together with Andreas Görke: Die ältesten Berichte über das Leben Muḥammads: das Korpus ʿUrwa ibn az-Zubair. Darwin Press, Inc., Princeton, N.J., 2008.
- The Genesis of Literature in Islam: From the Aural to the Read, in Collaboration with and Translated by Shawkat M. Toorawa. Edinburgh 2009. Augmented English translation of Ecrire et transmettre dans les débuts de l'islam. The main addition is a chapter on al-Jahiz.
- Abū l-ʿAlāʾ al-Maʿarī: The Epistle of Forgiveness: Volume One: A Vision of Heaven and Hell. Edited and translated by Geert Jan Van Gelder and Gregor Schoeler. New York University Press, New York 2013.
- Abū l-ʿAlāʾ al-Maʿarrī: The Epistle of Forgiveness: Volume Two: Hypocrites, Heretics, and Other Sinners. Edited and translated by Geert Jan Van Gelder and Gregor Schoeler. New York University Press, New York 2014.
- Together with Youssef Mogtader: Turandot. Die persische Märchenerzählung, Edition, Übersetzung, Kommentar. Wiesbaden 2017.
- Arabische Handschriften, Teil XIV Arabische Foliobände der Staatsbibliothek zu Berlin - Preussischer Kulturbesitz (= Verzeichnis der orientalischen Handschriften in Deutschland XVII B14), Stuttgart 2020.
- Recording in The Wiley Blackwell Concise Companion to the Hadith. Ed. by D.W. Brown. Hoboken NJ 2020. p. 91–112.
- „Arabic“, in How Literatures Begin: A Global History. Ed by Joel B. Lande & Denis Feeny. Princeton University Press, Princeton & Oxford 2021. p. 191–216.
- Together with Andreas Görke: The Earliest Writings on the Life of Muḥammad. The ʿUrwa Corpus and the Non-Muslim Sources. (=Studies in Late Antiquity and Islam 27). Gerlach Press, Berlin 2024.
