= Leg Over Leg =

Leg over Leg
- NYU Press edition (2014)
- Author: Ahmad Faris Shidyaq
- Original title: الساق على الساق
- Translator: Humphrey T. Davies
- Language: Arabic
- Genre: Novel
- Published: 1855 (Arabic)
- Publisher: NYU Press (English)
- Publication place: France
- English publication date: 2013
- Pages: 1920 pages
- ISBN: 9781479897544
- Website: http://nyupress.org/books/9781479897544

Leg over Leg (Arabic: الساق على الساق, romanized: al-saaq ealaa al-saaq) is a book by Ahmad Faris Shidyaq, considered one of the founders of modern Arabic literature. Detailing the life of 'the Fariyaq', the alter ego of the author, offering commentary on intellectual and social issues, it is described as "always edifying and often hilarious", "the finest, wildest, funniest and most surprising novel in Arabic", and "[an] unclassifiable book". It was originally published in 1855 in Arabic in Paris.

In 2014, NYU Press published an English translation by Humphrey T. Davies as part of the Library of Arabic Literature series. It was collected in four volumes in an Arabic-English bilingual edition and two volumes in a paperback English edition.

== History ==
The book was first published in Arabic 1855 in France. The author did not publish it in his homeland, Lebanon, likely because of the book's comments on religion.
