= 'A'isha al-Ba'uniyya =

Medieval Arabic Sufi master and poet

- Born: ʿĀʾishah bint Yūsuf al-Bāʿūniyyah c. 1456; Damascus, Mamluk Sultanate (now Syria)
- Died: December 1517; Damascus, Mamluk Sultanate (now Syria)
- Occupations: Sufi master, poet, writer
- Writing career
- Language: Arabic
- Notable works: Al-Fath al-Mubin, Al-Mawrid al-Ahnā

ʿĀʾishah bint Yūsuf al-Bāʿūniyyah (Arabic: عائشة بنت يوسف الباعونية, died the sixteenth day of Dhū al-Qa‘dah, 922/1517) was a Sufi master and poet. She is one of few female medieval Islamic mystics to have recorded their own views in writing, and she "probably composed more works in Arabic than any other woman prior to the twentieth century." Some of her works have been translated to English in the 21st century. "In her the literary talents and Ṣūfi tendencies of her family reached full fruition." She was born and died in Damascus.

== Life ==
Her father Yūsuf (born Jerusalem, 805/1402 – died in Damascus, 880/1475) was a qadi in Safed, Tripoli, Aleppo, and Damascus, and a member of the prominent al-Bāʻūnī family, noted through the fifteenth century for its scholars, poets and jurists. She is believed to have been born into a distinguished family of scholars. Her grandfather, Ahmad ibn Nasir, was a prominent preacher and Shafi’i judge in both Damascus and Jerusalem, known as the “Shaykh ash-Shuyukh” (Master of Scholars). Like her brothers ‘Ā’ishah was taught primarily by her father, along with other family members, studying the Quran, hadith, jurisprudence, and poetry, and by her claim, by the age of eight, ‘Ā’ishah was a hafiza (she had learned the Quran by heart).

Meanwhile, her principal Sufi masters were Jamāl al-Dīn Ismā‘īl al-Ḥawwārī (fl. late ninth/fifteenth century) and his successor Muḥyī al-Dīn Yaḥyá al-Urmawī (fl. ninth-tenth/fifteenth-sixteenth centuries), whom she held in high regard. Probably in 1475, ‘Ā’ishah undertook the pilgrimage to Mecca. She was married to Aḥmad ibn Muḥammad Ibn Naqīb al-Ashrāf (d. 909/1503), from the prominent ‘Alid family of Damascus, also noted for their scholarship; by ‘Ā’ishah's reckoning, Aḥmad was descended from Muḥammad's daughter Faṭimah and her husband ‘Alī, via their son al-Ḥusayn. ‘Ā’ishah and Aḥmad had two known children, a son, ‘Abd al-Wahhāb (b. 897/1489), and a daughter, Barakah (b. 899/1491).

=== Studies in Cairo and death ===
In 919/1513, ‘Ā’ishah and her son moved from Damascus to Cairo, returning to Damascus in 923/1517. ‘Ā’ishah's goal may have been to secure her son's career. On the way, their caravan was raided by bandits near Bilbeis, who stole their possessions, including ‘Ā’ishah's writings. It appears that in Cairo, she and her son were hosted by Maḥmūd ibn Muḥammad ibn Ajā (b. 854/1450, d. 925/1519), who was personal secretary and foreign minister to al-Ashraf Qansuh al-Ghuri (d. 922/1516), the Burji Mamluk sultan. Ibn Ajā helped ‘Abd al-Wahhāb find work in the chancery and helped ‘Ā’ishah enter into Cairo's intellectual circles; ‘Ā’ishah went on to write him 'several glowing panegyrics'.

In Cairo, ‘Ā’ishah studied law and was granted license to lecture in law and to issue fatwas (legal opinions); "she gained wide recognition as a jurist". As she was granted the authority to teach and issue fatwas, it attracted many male and female students.

‘Ā’ishah left Cairo in 922/1516, with her son and Ibn Ajā, and alongside al-Badr al-Suyūfī (c. 850–925/1446–1519), al-Shams al-Safīrī (877–956/1472–1549), and several other noted scholars, was granted an audience with Sultan Qansuh al-Ghawri in Aleppo shortly before his defeat at the Battle of Marj Dabiq: 'an extraordinary event befitting her exceptional life'. ʻĀ’ishah then returned to Damascus, where she died in 923/1517.

ʻĀ’ishah "inherited an independence of mind and outlook which is seen in her companionship with her men contemporaries on equal terms". Thus she was a close friend of Abu 'l-Thanā' Maḥmūd b. Ajā, who was the final ṣāḥib dawāwīn al-inshāʼ of the Mamluk era, and corresponded, in verse, with the Egyptian scholar ‘Abd al-Raḥmān al-‘Abbāsī (b. 867/1463, d. 963/1557). 'It is quite apparent from biographies of ‘Ā’ishah and from her own comments in her writings that she was highly regarded as a pious woman and Sufi master.' Her manuscript The Principles of Sufism, which is described as her "key work", has been translated into English by Th. Emil Homerin. In this book, she "outlines her philosophy based on the four principles of repentance, sincerity, remembrance and love."

== Works ==
=== List of works ===
According to Th. Emil Homerin, the chronology of ʿĀ’ishah's work is not yet known, and indeed the majority has been lost, but ʿĀ’ishah's known original works are:

- Dīwān al-Bā‘ūniyyah (collection of poems)
- Durar al-ghā’iṣ fī baḥr al-Mu‘jizāt wa ’l-kha-ṣā’iṣ (The Diver's Pearls, on the Sea of "The Miracles and Virtues")
- al-Fatḥ al-ḥaqqī min fayḥ al-talaqqī (True Inspiration, from the Diffused Perfume of Mystical Learning') (lost)
- al-Fatḥ al-mubīn fī madḥ al-amīn (Clear Inspiration, on Praise of the Trusted One)
- al-Fatḥ al-qarīb fī mi‘rāq al-ḥabīb (Immediate Inspiration, on the Ascension of the Beloved) (lost)
- Fayḍ al-faḍl wa-jam‘ al-shaml (The Emanation of Grace and the Gathering of the Union)
- Fayḍ al-wafā fī asmā’ al-muṣṭafā (The Emanation of Loyalty, on the Names of the Chosen One) (lost)
- al-Ishārāt al-khafiyyah fī ’l-Manāzi al-‘aliyyah (The Hidden Signs, on the "Exalted Stations") (lost)
- Madad al-wadūd fī mawlid al-maḥmūd (The Aid of the Affectionate God, on the Birth of the Praiseworthy Prophet) (lost)
- al-Malāmiḥ al-sharīfah min al-āthār al-laṭīfah (Noble Features, on Elegant Reports) (lost)
- al-Mawrid al-ahnā fī ’l-mawlid al-asnā (The Most Wholesome Source, on the Most Exalted Birthday)
- al-Munktakhab fī uṣūl al-rutab (Selections on the Fundamentals of Stations)
- al-Qawl al-ṣaḥīḥ fī takhmīs Burdat al-madīḥ (Reliable Words, on the Quintains of the "Mantle of Eulogy")
- Ṣilāt al-salām fī faḍl al-ṣalāh wa ’l-salām (Gifts of Peace, on the Merit of Blessing and Salutation) (lost)
- Tashrīf al-fikr fī naẓm fawā’id al-dhikr (Noble Thought, on the Benefits of Recollection in Verse)
- al-Zubdah fī takhmīs al-Burdah (The Fresh Cream Quintain of "The Mantle") (lost)

In addition to these, ʿĀ’ishah adapted a range of other texts. Homerin has also published some of the only translations of ʿĀ’ishah's work into English:

- Th. Emil Homerin, 'Living Love: The Mystical Writings of ʿĀ’ishah al-Bāʿūniyyah (d. 922/1516)', Mamluk Studies Review, 7 (2003), 211–34.
- Th. Emil Homerin, 'The Principles of Sufism'. By Ā’ishah al-Bāʿūniyyah.

=== Clear Inspiration, on Praise of the Trusted One ===
ʿĀ’ishah's best-known work is her Clear Inspiration, on Praise of the Trusted One (al-Fatḥ al-mubīn fī madḥ al-amīn), a 130-verse Badī‘iyya (a form designed to illustrate the badī or rhetorical devices in the poetic repertoire, with each verse illustrating a particular device) in praise of the Islamic prophet Muhammad. Influenced by Abd al-Qadir al-Jilani, her poetry conveys a mystical love for God and the Prophet. Her panegyrics stand out as masterpieces. Referring to nearly fifty earlier poets, the work emphasises the breadth of ʿĀ’ishah's learning. This text 'no doubt' inspired ‘Abd al-Ghanī al-Nābulusī's Nasamāt al-Azhār; both writers accompanied their respective badī‘iyyas with a commentary.

=== The Emanation of Grace and the Gathering of the Union ===
The Emanation of Grace and the Gathering of the Union (Fayḍ al-faḍl wa-jam‘al-shali) is a collection of over 300 long poems in which ʿĀ’ishah 'described mystical states and praised Muhammad, the founder of her order variously Abdul Qadir Gilani, and her own Sufi shaykhs. She used technical terminology and typical Sufi poetic motifs such as wine and love in her poems'. They seem to date from throughout ʿĀ’ishah's life up to her move to Cairo and show her command of almost all Arabic poetic forms of the time.

=== Selections on the Fundamentals of Stations ===
In this work, called in Arabic Al-Muntakhab fi Usul al-Rutab, she attempted to articulate and clarify some of her mystical beliefs and practices in a separate Sufi compendium. She notes at the outset that the stages of the mystical folk are innumerable. Still, all of them are based on four fundamental principles of the path towards God: repentance, sincerity (ikhlas)), dhikr (recollection), and love (muhabba).

Principle 1: Tawbah (Repentance) (1) remorse for past misdeeds, (2) desisting immediately from current offenses, and (3) never returning to sin. She further notes that each body part has a share in repentance. The heart must resolve to leave sin and be remorseful, while the eyes should be downcast; the hands should cease to grasp; the feet should stop hurrying, and the ears should stop trying to listen in. This is repentance for the common people. The repentance of the elect goes further by opposing the lust of concupiscence (nafs) and by averting the gaze of the heart away from pleasure and prosperity while abstaining from all transient things. Such repentance is required for the love for God, who said (2:222): "Verily, God loves those who turn in repentance. . . ."

Higher still is the repentance of the elect of the elect. They turn away from considering anything but God, including spiritual states and blessings, until God reveals His beauty to them, eradicating everything but Himself.

Principle 2: Ikhlas (Sincerity) Sincere obedience to God should be motivated only by the desire to draw closer to Him. The believer should not think of attaining praise or glory among people, for sincerity requires the utmost humility. Therefore, concupiscence (nafs) is to be disciplined, while the heart must be blind to the opinions of others, as the spirit guards against pride. Sincerity, she says, is like water helping the tiny seeds of good works to grow, while hypocrisy is a cyclone that will sweep away the fields of one's labor.

Principle 3: Dhikr (Recollection) The third principle, dhikr, or "recollection" of God is essential to both repentance and sincerity. ‘A’ishah begins her section on this pivotal topic with God's promise in the Quran (2:152): "Remember Me, and I will remember you," and she elaborates on this reciprocal relationship of recollection between God and His faithful worshippers in a series of mystical interpretations: "Remember Me with sincerity, and I will remember you among the spiritual elect; remember Me in your striving, and I will remember You with witnessing; . . . remember Me in your passing away, and I will remember you in your abiding; . . . remember Me in your hearts, and I will remember you in nearness to Me; remember Me in your spirits, and I will remember you in moments of enlightenment; remember Me in your heart secrets, and I will remember you in illuminations!"

Principle 4: Mahabbah (Divine Love)

This leads naturally to mahabbah, or "love," the subject of the final and longest section of Al-Muntakhab. She opens with God's command to Muhammad in the Quran (3:31): "Say: 'If you love God, then follow me and God will love you.'" She quotes Qushayri saying true love of God requires lovers to efface themselves completely as their beloved wears them out. This love relationship is possible because God created human beings in the best of forms and, so, He has a special affection for them.

She then goes on to mentioning levels as well as the signs of divine love being bestowed on someone.

For the common believer, the seeds of love are planted by reading the Quran and following the custom of the Prophet and then nourished by complying with divine law. This love will thwart Satan's temptations, provide solace in times of adversity, and make service to God delightful. By contrast, love among the spiritual elite strikes like lightning, confusing the lovers. This overwhelming love causes the spiritual elite to pass away in God's love for them, which is beyond any description or allusion.

She then turns to the signs of love, which include intimacy with God and estrangement from the world, awe before God and contentment with His will, performing pious deeds, loving others who love God, and passing away in the beloved from all things.

Her writing here reflects an invitation to chase the path of love like she often does in her poems:

"I see love, an ocean without a shore. If you are love's chosen ones, plunge in!"

== International Recognition ==
In 2006, UNESCO commemorated the 500th anniversary of her birth, listing her alongside figures like Freud and Mozart.

Celebrations in the Arab world included conferences, articles, poetry recitations, and tributes, such as naming a street in Damascus and several schools after her.

== Editions ==
- al-Mawrid al-ahnā fī ’l-mawlid al-asnā and al-Fatḥ al-mubīn fī madḥ al-amīn, in ‘Ā’ishah al-Bā‘ūniyyah al-Dimashqiyyah, ed. by F. al-‘Alawī (Damascus: Dār Ma‘add, 1994)
- Dīwān Fayḍ al-faḍl wa-jamʻ al-shaml, ed. by Mahdī Asʻad ʻArār (Bayrūt : Dār al-Kutub al-ʻIlmīyah, 2010). ISBN 9782745167637
