= Devin J. Stewart =

American Islamic studies scholar (born 1962)

Devin J. Stewart is a scholar of Islamic studies and Arabic language and literature, born on the 14th of November, 1962, in Portland, Oregon. He is Samuel Candler Dobbs Professor of Middle eastern and South Asian studies at Emory University. His research interests include Islamic law, the Qur'an, Islamic schools and branches and varieties of Arabic.

== Education ==
Stewart graduated magna cum laude with an A.B. in Near Eastern studies from Princeton University in 1984 after completing a 143-page long senior thesis titled "Three Wise Men: The Safawi Religious Institution 1576 - 1629." He completed the Center for Arabic Study Abroad's program at the American University in Cairo, and then earned his PhD with distinction in Arabic and Islamic studies at the University of Pennsylvania six years later.

== Career ==
Stewart has taught Arabic studies, Islamic studies and Middle Eastern studies at the Department of Middle Eastern and South Asian Studies at Emory University since 1990. He also serves on the editorial board for the Library of Arabic Literature. He is one of the senior editors of the Encyclopedia of Islam.

Much of Stewart's work has focused on the reconstruction of early Muslim legal theory based on ancient texts. He has also called attention to infrequently studied genres of Arabic literature such as Maqama.

== Work ==
=== Articles ===
- Stewart, Devin (1997). "Impoliteness Formulae: The Cognate Curse in Egyptian Arabic". Journal of Semitic Studies. 42 (2): 327–360.
- Stewart, Devin (1990). "Sajʿ in the "Qurʾān": Prosody and Structure". Journal of Arabic Literature. 21 (2): 101–139. JSTOR 4183221.
- Stewart, Devin (2006). "Rhymed Prose". Encyclopaedia Of The Quran Vol 4. Brill. pp. 476–484.
- Stewart, Devin (2006b). "Soothsayer". Encyclopaedia Of The Quran Vol 5. Brill. pp. 78–80.
- Stewart, Devin (2007). "The Structure of the Fihrist: Ibn al-Nadim as Historian of Islamic Legal and Theological Schools". International Journal of Middle East Studies. 39 (3): 369–387. doi:10.1017/S0020743807070511. JSTOR 30069526. S2CID 161910065.
- Stewart, Devin (2011). "The mysterious letterrs and other formal features of the Qurʾān in light of Greek and Babylonian oracular texts". In Reynolds, Gabriel Said (ed.). New Perspectives on the Qurʾān: The Qurʾān in its historical context 2. Routledge. pp. 323–348.
- Stewart, Devin (2013). "Divine Epithets and the Dibacchius: Clausulae and Qur'anic Rhythm". Journal of Qur'anic Studies. 15 (2): 22–64.
- Stewart, Devin (2017). "Reflections on the State of the Art in Western Qurʾanic Studies". In Bakhos, Carol; Cook, Michael (eds.). Islam and Its Past: Jahiliyya, Late Antiquity, and the Qurʾan. Oxford University Press. pp. 4–68.
- Stewart, Devin (2022). "Approaches to the Investigation of Speech Genres in the Qur'an". Journal of Qur'anic Studies. 24 (3): 1–45.
- Stewart, Devin (2024). "Ignoring the Bible in Qur'anic Studies: Scholarship of the Late Twentieth Century". ReOrient. 9 (1): 131–169.
- Stewart, Devin (2024b). "Images of Writing in the Qurʾān and Sulṭān as a Royal Warrant". Der Islam. 101 (1): 74–131.
- Stewart, Devin (2024c). ""Signs for Those Who Can Decipher Them": Ancient Ruins in the Qurʾān". In Rashwani, Samer (ed.). Behind the Story: Ethical Readings of Qurʾānic Narratives. Brill. pp. 44–92.

=== Books ===
- Islamic Legal Orthodoxy: Twelver Shiite Responses to the Sunni Legal System. Salt Lake City: University of Utah Press, 1998.

=== Edited works ===
- Texts and Studies on the Qurʾān, with Gerhard Böwering and Bilal Orfali. Leiden: Brill Publishers.
