= Al-Urwah al-Wuthqa =

Islamic revolutionary journal (1884)

- Editor: Jamāl al-Dīn al-Afghānī and Muhammad Abduh
- Categories: literary, political
- First issue: 13 March 1884
- Final issue: October 1884
- Country: France
- Based in: Paris
- Language: Arabic

Al-Urwah al-Wuthqa (Arabic: العروة الوثقى, romanized: al-ʿurwa al-wuthqā, lit. 'The Firmest Bond') was an Islamic revolutionary journal founded by Muhammad Abduh and Jamāl al-Dīn al-Afghānī. Despite only running from 13 March 1884 to October 1884, it was one of the first and most important publications of the Nahda. The journal targeted people across the Islamic ummah, calling upon them to unite. Its firm stance against European colonialism caused British authorities to ban it in Egypt and India. Al-Urwah al-Wuthqa is an Arabic term with religious significance, appearing twice in the Quran.

== History and profile ==
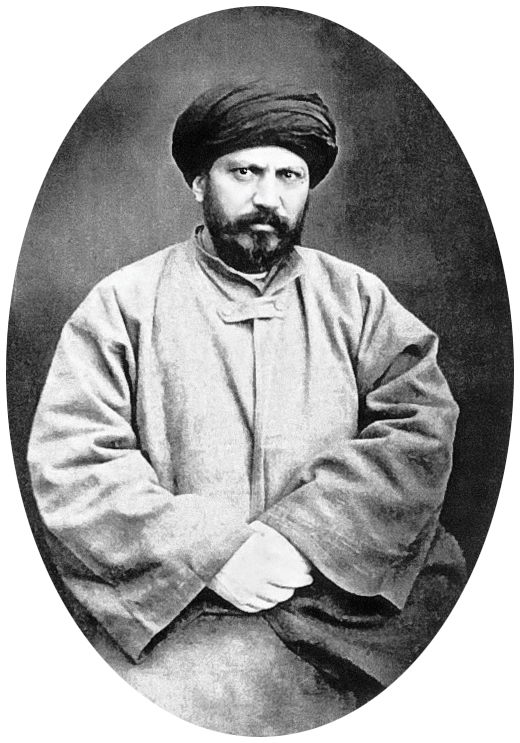
Jamal-al-Din Afghani advocated Islamic unity in the face of an increasingly stronger Christian Europe.

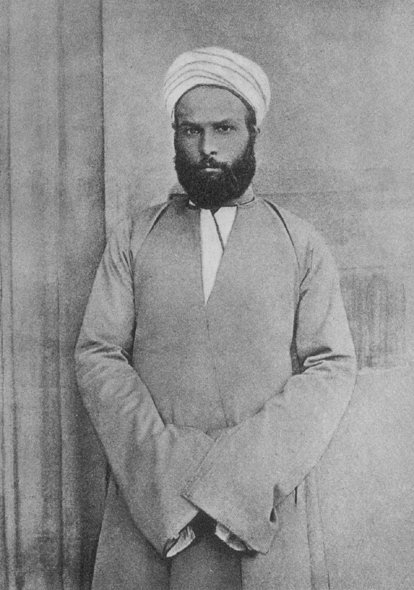
Muhammad Abduh was an Islamic modernist and rationalist.

The journal was founded in a room in Paris in 1884, and the first edition was published on March 13 of that year (corresponding with 15 Jumādā al-Ūlā, 1301). Ibrāhīm al-Muwayliḥī and his son Muhammad al-Muwaylihi, both in exile from the Ottoman Empire, helped with its publication.

The Imam Muhammad Abduh summarized the main goals of the magazine in a speech he sent to his friend, the English poet Wilfrid Scawen Blunt: protecting the independence of Eastern peoples from the aggression of Western countries, and to pressure the English government into stopping its policies that harm Muslims.

Also among the goals of the magazine, as can be ascertained from its editorial line: a call to unite and stand in solidarity, and to embrace the Nahda, and to liberate Egypt and Sudan from British colonialism.

== Censorship ==
Al-Urwah al-Wuthqa was banned by British authorities in Egypt and India, and an elaborate network including Arab businessmen in Bombay disseminated copies throughout the Arab world.

== End of publication ==
Muhammad Abduh and Jamāl al-Dīn al-Afghānī decided to end the magazine in October 1884 after publishing 18 editions over the course of eight months, probably due to financial problems resulting from the ban.

== Legacy ==
Some issues of Al-Urwah al-Wuthqa were found in the library of Dar al-Arab publishers, in addition to some other writings and speeches of Muhammad Abduh and Jamāl al-Dīn al-Afghānī. In 1957, these were published with a foreword from Gamal Abdel Nasser in a book entitled Al-Urwah al-Wuthqa wa al-Thawra al-Tahririya al-Kubra (العروة الوثقى والثورة التحريرية الكبرى).
