= Mohammad bin Ahmad Al-Ba'uni =

- Born: 1374; Damascus
- Other names: Mohammad Al-Ba'uni
- Occupation: Writer
- Era: Mamluk period

Mohammad bin Ahmad Al-Ba'uni (Arabic title: محمد بن أحمد الباعوني) is Shams Al-Din Abu Al-Barakat Mohammad bin Ahmad bin Naser bin Khalifa bin Farah bin Abdullah bin Abdulrahman Al-shams bin Shehab Al-Ba'uni Al-Demashqi Al-Shafi'i the brother of Ibrahim and Yusuf.

He was born in Damascus and died in it (776 – 870 AH) (1374 -1466 AD). The name of Al-Ba'uni was taken from Ba'un, which is one of the villages of Ajloun in eastern Jordan.

== His life ==
He was born in Damascus and grew up there. He memorized the Qur’an and the curriculum and presented it to a group. He learnt fiqh from his father and the two teachers Shihab Al-Din Ahmad bin Abdullah bin Badr Al-Ghazi and Muhammad bin Ahmed bin Musa bin Abdullah Al-Shams Al-Kafiri Al-Ajlouni. He worked in fields other than jurisprudence as well. He recited Al-Hadith for Al-Shams Mohammad bin Mohammad bin Khattab and Aysha bint ibn Abdulhadi and others. He cared about poetic composition and came up with beautiful lines. He composed a poem in the prophetic biography for Al-Alaa' Magaltai and called it (Arabic title: Menhatu Al-Labib fe Siratu Al-Habib), which was more than one thousand lines. He also wrote (Arabic title:Tuhafatu Al-Dhurafa' fe Tarikh Al-Muluk wa Al-Khulafa'), and (Arabic title: Yanabee' Al-Ahzan). He wrote a lot of Hadith books and the like with his own handwriting.

He gave a khutbah at Al-Nasiri Ibn Manjak Mosque, known as Al-Qasab Mosque, as well as the Mosque of Damascus. He began writing Al-asra and Al-aswar and others, but he stopped later engaging himself in worshiping. He talked about some of his compositions and other things. Among those who wrote about him was Abu Al-Abbas al-Majdali, the preacher. Even ibn Khatib Al-Nasiriyah wrote about him and described him as the virtuous, scholarly imam. He wrote about him in some of his compositions and even he recited some of his narrations. All were good. He died in Ramadan and was buried with his father behind the corner of Ibn Dawood, may God have mercy on him. An example of his poetry is his eulogy to one of his sons:

Oh, Mohammad! If meeting you back is impossible

and the pleasures of life vanish all,

I will cry over you all my life,

and if I die, my bones in their grave will cry over you.

== His works ==
- (Arabic title: Takhmin Qasidet ibn Zurayq).
- (Arabic title: Yanabi' Al-Ahzan).
- (Arabic title: Tuhfet Al-Dhurafaa' fe Tarikh Al-Muluk and Khulafaa'), Orjuza a poem written using Al-Rajaz metre in the history of the caliphs and sultans who took over Egypt until the era of Al-Ashraf Barsbay.
- (Arabic title: Menhatu Al-Labib fe Siratu Al-Habib), orjuza in which he composed the prophetic biography for Magaltai.
- (Arabic title: Al-hadh Al-mawfur fe madh ibn Al-farfur)
- (Arabic title: Jawaher Al-mataleb fe manaqeb al-imam Ali bin Abu Taleb (book)).
- (Arabic title: Faraed Al-Suluk fe Tarikh Al-Khulafaa' and Al-muluk
