= Bilal Orfali =

Lebanese scholar of Arabic language and literature

Bilal Orfali is a Lebanese scholar of Arabic language and literature. He currently serves as Sheikh Zayed Chair of Arabic and Islamic Studies at the American University of Beirut. He is considered an expert on Arabic prose and poetry, especially during the 10th century.

== Life ==
Orfali earned a Bachelor of Science, Bachelor of Arts and Master of Arts from the American University of Beirut in 2000, 2001 and 2003 respectively. He then went on to earn a Master of Philosophy in 2006 and a Doctor of Philosophy in 2009, both from Yale University. Orfali is currently a professor of Arabic studies at AUB, while also having served as a visiting scholar at the prestigious Institute for Advanced Study in Princeton, New Jersey from 2011 to 2012. He also serves as the director of the AUB's intensive CAMES summer program for Arabic language education.

== Selected works ==
=== Abstracts ===
- "The Arabian Nights Encyclopedia," taken from Encyclopedias About Muslim Civilisations by Aptin Khanbaghi (ed), pgs. 25–26. Translated by Yasmeen Hanoosh. Edinburgh: Edinburgh University Press, 2009.

=== Articles ===
- Orfali, Bilal (2009). "The Works of Abū Manṣūr al-Tha'ālibī (350-429/961-1039)". Journal of Arabic Literature. 40 (3). Leiden: Brill Publishers: 273–318. doi:10.1163/008523709X12554960674539. JSTOR 20720591.
- "A Sketch Map of Arabic Poetry Anthologies up to the Fall of Baghdad." Journal of Arabic Literature, vol. 43, # 1, 2012. Pgs. 29–59.

=== Edited works ===
- In the Shadow of Arabic: The Centrality of Language to Arabic Culture. Leiden: Brill Publishers, 2011. 1st ed., 572 pgs. ISBN 9789004215375
- Sufism, Black and White, with Nada Saab. Leiden: Brill Publishers, 2012. 1st ed., 570 pgs. ISBN 9789004216778
- Texts and Studies on the Qurʾān, with Gerhard Böwering and Devin J. Stewart. Leiden: Brill Publishers. ISSN 1567-2808

=== Original works ===
- The Comfort of the Mystics, with Gerhard Böwering. Leiden: Brill Publishers, 2013. 1st ed., 720 pgs. ISBN 9789004233614
