= Shawkat Toorawa =

British academic

Shawkat M. Toorawa
- Born: 1963 (age 62–63); London, England

Academic work
- Main interests: Islamic Studies; Medieval Arabic Literature; Quranic (Islamic) studies

Shawkat M. Toorawa (born 1963) is the Brand Blanshard Professor of Near Eastern Languages & Civilizations and a professor of comparative literature at Yale University. He has published extensively on classical, medieval and modern Arabic literature, and has also published translations from Arabic. He identifies himself as a multicultural Muslim having lived in England, France, Hong Kong, Singapore, Mauritius and the US. He is a faculty member in the Near Eastern Languages and Civilizations Department at Yale University.

== Biography ==
Toorawa was born in London, England to Mauritian parents of Indian origin. Both parents were Muslim, one Shia and one Sunni, and were married in 1962. The family moved three years later, in 1965, to Paris, France where his father was transferred.

He first became aware of being Muslim in 1966 through his Senegalese tutor, Abdullah Diop, who came to their apartment daily to teach him the Arabic Script and stories about the prophets. A year later, at the age of five he began attending the English School of Paris. It was here that he learnt about Moses, Jesus and Muhammad and began constructing his understanding of interfaith differences. His parents told him the “different people believed different things” and that as Muslims they “did not believe that Jesus had been killed or that he had died on the cross, but that Christians did, and that was OK.” He performed the Hajj with his family before they moved to Osaka, Japan and then Hong Kong in 1972. A year later the family moved to Singapore where he attended an international school, the United World College of South East Asia.

In 1981 he left Singapore to pursue a Bachelor’s degree with honors in Oriental Studies at the University of Pennsylvania. He graduated magna cum laude in 1985. He continued to pursue his education at the University of Pennsylvania for the next four years and graduated with a Master of Arts in Oriental Studies (Arabic and Islamic Studies) in 1989. He returned to the university in 1998 to pursue a Ph.D. in Asian and Middle Eastern Studies (Islamic Near East) with distinction. He taught at Duke University from 1989 to 1991, and at the University of Mauritius from 1996 to 2000. He taught at Cornell University from 2000 to 2016.

He has written about Classic and Medieval Arabic Literature, Modern Arabic poetry, the Quran, Islam and the Indian Ocean. His research focuses mainly on the Middle East and South Asia.

He is a former Mellon Foundation New Directions Fellow. He is Co-Executive Editor of the Library of Arabic Literature, an initiative to translate classical and premodern Arabic Literature. He is also a Director of the School of Abbasid Studies.

== The Dr. T Project ==
The Dr.T Project was an idea that first occurred to Toorawa in 2010 while trying to teach students in his classes by connecting subject material to cultural material. When he found that most students didn’t understand the references he teased his class by saying he should teach a class called “Everything Professor Toorawa Thinks You Should Know but You Don’t.”

Students began emailing him asking if such a class did exist and on August 24, 2010 Carol Grumbach, director of the Carol Tatkon Center at Cornell University offered to run such a programme at the centre. "Something like 50 or 60 people showed up," Toorawa said. "And we thought, 'This might work.'” Since then the Dr.T Project has been in session once a week during academic semesters (tea and shortbread are served as an additional lure). It moved to Willard Straight Hall in 2013 where with the assistance of the Browsing Library Director, Brandon Pierotti, the programme garnered much continued success. It is now hosted at Yale.

== Publications ==
=== Articles and Contributions to Books ===
- "Prayer". Key Themes for the Study of Islam, ed. Jamal J. Elias (Oxford: Oneworld Publications, 2010)
- "Azad Bilgrami". Essays in Arabic Literary Biography II: 1350-1850, ed. Joseph E. Lowry and Devin J. Stewart (Wiesbaden: Harrassowitz Verlag, 2008)
- "The Shifa’ al-‘alil of Azad Bilgrami (d. 1200/1786): Introducing an Eighteenth-Century Work on al-Mutanabbi’s Poetry". Middle Eastern Literatures 11/2 (2008), 249–264
- "Referencing the Qur'an: A Proposal, with Illustrative Translations and Discussion". Journal of Qur'anic Studies 9(1) (2007), 134–148
- "Islamic Literatures: Writing in the Shade of the Qur'an". Voices of Islam, vol. 4: Voices of Beauty, Art and Science, ed. Vincent Cornell (Westport, Conn.: Greenwood, 2006), 121–141
- "Defining Adab by (re)defining the Adib: Ibn Abi Tahir Tayfur and storytelling". On Fiction and Adab in Medieval Arabic Literature, ed. Philip Kennedy (Wiesbaden: Harrassowitz, 2005), 285-306
- "Modern Arabic Literature and the Qur'an: Creativity, Inimitability… Incompatibilities?". Religious Perspectives in Modern Muslim and Jewish Literatures, ed. Glenda Abramson and Hilary Kilpatrick (London: RoutledgeCurzon, 2005), 239-257
- "Travel in the Medieval Islamic World: The Importance of Patronage as Illustrated by `Abd al-Latif al-Baghdadi". Eastward Bound: Travel and Travellers, 1050-1550, ed. Rosamund Allen (Manchester: Manchester University Press, 2004), 57-70
- "Ibn Abi Tahir vs. al-Jahiz". Occasional Papers of the School of Abbasid Studies, Cambridge, 6–10 July 2002, ed. James Montgomery (Leuven: Peeters, 2004), 247-261
- "Proximity, Resemblance, Sidebars and Clusters: Ibn al-Nadim’s Organizational Principles in Fihrist 3.3"]. Oriens 38 (2010), 217-247
- Seeking Refuge from Evil: The Power and Portent of the Closing Chapters of the Qur'an. Journal of Qur'anic Studies 4(2), 2002, pp. 54–60

=== Translations ===
- "Dracula", a translation of Salwa Al-Naimi, ‘Drakula’. Poetry 194/1 (April 2009), 62-63
- "Flower of Alchemy" and "Church of Daytime", translations of "Zahrat al-kimiya" and "Kanisat al-nahar" by Adonis. al-‘Arabiyya 40-41 (2007-2008), 145
- "The Fall", translation of Adonis, ‘al-Suqut’. Redivider 5(1) (Fall 2007), 81
- "The New Noah", a translation of Adonis, ‘Nuh al-jadid’. Poetry 190/1 (April 2007), 21-23
- "The Inimitable Rose", being Qur'anic saj‘ from Surat al-Duhâ to Surat al-Nâs (Q. 93–114) in English rhyming prose. Journal of Qur'anic Studies 8.2 (2006), 143–153
- "This Is My Name", a translation of Adonis, "هذا هو اسمي". Journal of Arabic Literature Vol. 24, No. 1 (Mar., 1993).

== Awards and Distinctions ==
=== Fellowships ===
- New Directions Fellowship, Andrew W. Mellon Foundation (2006–09)
- Visiting Fellowship, Oxford Centre for Islamic Studies (April–August 2007)

=== Awards ===
- The James A. Perkins Prize for Interracial Understanding and Harmony, Cornell University (2006)
- Honorary Member, National Residence Hall Honorary (2008–10)
- Member, Honorary Advisory Board, Abraham’s Vision (2005–)
- Member International Jury, Zanzibar International Film Festival, Stonetown, Zanzibar (1999)
- First Prize, Aftaab-e-Islam Mosque Centenary Essay Competition, Mauritius (1996)
- Second Prize, The Ezra Pound Award for Literary Translation, University of Pennsylvania (1989)
- First Prize, AATA Translation Contest (1986)

== See also ==
- Hussein Abdul-Raof
- Library of Arabic Literature
