= Bensalem Himmich =

Moroccan philosopher and writer

Minister of Culture
- In office 29 July 2009 – 3 January 2012
- Monarch: Mohammed VI
- Prime Minister: Abbas El Fassi
- Preceded by: Touriya Jabrane
- Succeeded by: Mohamed Amine Sbihi

Personal details
- Born: 13 August 1948 (age 78) Meknes, Morocco
- Party: USPFP

Bensalem Himmich (Arabic: بنسالم حميش; born in 1948 in Meknes) is a Moroccan novelist, poet and philosopher with a PhD in Philosophy from the University of Paris, who teaches at the Mohammed V University, Rabat. He served as Minister of Culture from 29 July 2009 to 3 January 2012.

== Career ==
He has published 26 books, both literary and scientific works, in Arabic and French. As a liberal philosopher, Himmich is concerned with matters including ideological education in Islam. He advocates the division of church and state. His creative and academic works are in both Arabic and French and some of his novels have been translated into several languages.

The Egyptian Writers’ Union selected his novel Majnoun Al-Hukm (The Theocrat) as one of the 100 best novels of the 20th Century, and another novel, Mu’adhdhibati (My Torturess), was shortlisted for the International Prize for Arabic Fiction. Himmich received the grand award of the French Academy of Toulouse in 2011.

His work deals with the problems and conflicts with which Morocco is faced today.

== Books ==
- De la formation idéologique en Islam
- Le Calife de l'épouvante (Le serpent à plumes)
- The Polymath, ed.: American University in Cairo
- Au pays de nos crises
- The Self - Between Existence and Creation

== Awards ==
- Bensalem Himmich won the prize of the critics (1990) for his novel le fou du pouvoir, a book elected by the Arab union of writers as one of the hundred best books of the 20th century.
- He won the prize Charika of the Arab culture of jury composed of UNESCO and well known literary personalities.
- Ben Salem Himmich won the Naguib Mahfouz Medal for Literature for his book Al-'Allamah (2001; The Polymath, a book about the great Arab writer Ibn Khaldoun) (The award was established in 1996 and awarded for the best contemporary novel published in Arabic. The winning work is translated into English and published in Cairo, London, and New York.)
- The Naguib Mahfouz Medal (Cairo, 2002). Himmich was awarded by the Naguib Mahfouz Medal for Literature for his book Al-'Allamah (The Polymath), about the great Arab writer and thinker Ibn Khaldoun.
- The UNESCO Sharjah Prize (Paris, 2003).
- 2019 Sheikh Zayed Book Award: Literature Award.
