= Th. Emil Homerin =

American scholar of religion (1955–2020)

Thomas Emil Homerin
- Born: May 19, 1955
- Died: December 26, 2020 (aged 65)
- Citizenship: American
- Spouse: Nora Walter (m. 1977)

Academic work
- Discipline: Arabic literature; Islam

Thomas Emil Homerin (19 May 1955 – 26 December 2020) was an American scholar of religion. He was Professor of Religion in the Department of Religion & Classics at the University of Rochester. He taught courses on Islam, classical Arabic literature, mysticism. He died in 2020 and buried in Mt. Hope Cemetery in Rochester.

== Early life ==
Thomas Emil Homerin was born in Pekin, Illinois, to Floyd A. Homerin and Miriam Jane Bond. He attended the University of Illinois Urbana-Champaign, where he earned a bachelor's degree in 1977 and a master's degree in 1978. He later completed a Ph.D. with honors at the University of Chicago in 1987. In 1977, he married Nora Walter; they had two sons, Luke and Elias.

== Career ==
A specialist in Arabic literature and Islam, Homerin had lived and worked in Egypt for a number of years. Among his many publications are The Wine of Love & Life: Ibn al-Fârid's al-Khamrîyah and al-Qaysarî’s Quest for Meaning (Chicago, 2005), From Arab Poet to Muslim Saint (2nd revised edition, Cairo: American University Press, 2001) and his anthology of translations, Ibn al-Fârid: Sufi Verse & Saintly Life (New York, 2001) published as part of the esteemed Paulist Press series Classics in Western Spirituality. The last of these books features a cover painting by fellow former Pekinite Mark Staff Brandl, with whom Homerin had also collaborated on many artworks and articles. Homerin also authored several chapters on Islam in The Religious Foundations of Western Civilization (Abingdon Press, 2006), edited by Jacob Neusner.

Death and the afterlife were a major focus of Homerin's work, and he carried out field work in Cairo's al-Qarafah cemetery. This initiated his interest in American funerary customs and practice which evolved into his course Speaking Stones on Mt. Hope Cemetery in Rochester, New York. This course examines western funeral ritual and practice, with a particular focus on cemeteries in the United States, and how the iconography and epigraphy of graves and funerary monuments forge symbolic connections among the living and the dead. Homerin and his students published the results of their research in Epitaph, the newsletter of the Friends of Mt. Hope Cemetery.

== Personal life ==
Homerin died on December 26, 2020 due to pancreatic cancer. He was married to Nora Walter and had two sons. Homerin was a member of the Unitarian Universalist church.

== Recognition ==
Homerin was the recipient of grants from the Mrs. Giles Whiting Foundation, the Fulbright Foundation, the American Research Center in Egypt, and the National Endowment for the Humanities. He also received a number of awards including the American Association of Teachers of Arabic Translation Prize, the Golden Key International Honour Society's recognition for his contributions to undergraduate education, the G. Granyon & Jane W. Curtis Award for Excellence in Nontenured Teaching, the University of Rochester's Teacher of the Year Award, and the Georgen Award for Distinguished Achievement and Artistry in Undergraduate Education.
