= Roger Allen (translator) =

English scholar of Arabic literature

Roger Allen (active 1968–present) is an English scholar of Arabic literature. He has translated several Arabic works of literature into English, and has also written scholarly works on Arabic literature.

== Career ==
Allen has translated into English numerous works of contemporary Arabic literature. His translations of Naguib Mahfouz were instrumental in bringing the Egyptian writer to global attention, and Allen also played a critical role in the nomination process that eventually led to Mahfouz winning the Nobel Prize in Literature in 1988.

Allen edited a volume of the Cambridge History of Arabic Literature and was consulted on the series.

Roger Allen received his doctorate from Oxford University in 1968.

Roger Allen served as a professor of Arabic Literature at the University of Pennsylvania since 1968. Allen was the first director of the Huntsman Program at the University of Pennsylvania along with Jamshed Ghandi.

== Personal life ==
Allen was organist-choirmaster of St. Mary’s Church, Hamilton Village, the Episcopal parish on the University of Pennsylvania campus, from 1974 until 2000.

== Works translated ==
- Naguib Mahfouz, God’s World (1973, in conjunction with Akef Abadir)
- Naguib Mahfouz, Autumn Quail (1985)
- Naguib Mahfouz, Mirrors (1977, 1999)
- Naguib Mahfouz, Karnak Café (2007)
- Naguib Mahfouz, Khan al-Khalili (2008)
- Naguib Mahfouz, One Hour Left (2010)
- Jabra Ibrahim Jabra, The Ship (in conjunction with Adnan Haydar)
- Jabra Ibrahim Jabra, In Search of Walid Masoud (in conjunction with Adnan Haydar)
- Yusuf Idris, In the Eye of the Beholder
- Abd al-rahman Munif, Endings
- Mayy Telmissany, Dunyazad
- BenSalim Himmich, The Polymath (2004)
- BenSalim Himmich, The Theocrat (2005)
- Ahmad al-Tawfiq, Abu Musa’s Women Neighbors (2006)
- Hanan al-Shaykh, The Locust and the Bird (2009)

== Other publications ==
One of his key works is The Arabic Novel: an historical and critical introduction (1st edition 1982), which initially took the form of a series of lectures at the University of Manchester. He also wrote a book on the Arabic literary tradition as a whole, titled The Arabic Literary Heritage (1998), which later appeared in shortened paperback format under the title An Introduction to Arabic Literature, which was itself translated into Arabic and published in Cairo in 2003. This is now regarded as the standard work in the field. For the series The Cambridge History of Arabic Literature, he edited the volume spanning 1150 to 1850, which was titled The Post-Classical Period (2006). He has contributed to many other scholarly ventures in his field. Beyond UPenn, he has been involved in academic activities in Egypt, Tunisia and Morocco, and has participated in the conferences of the Supreme Council for Culture in Egypt. His former students prepared a three-part festschrift in his honour in 2008-2009.
