= Michael Cooperson =

American scholar and translator

Michael Cooperson is an American scholar and translator of Arabic literature. He is a professor of Arabic at UCLA. He has written two books: Classical Arabic Biography: The Heirs of the Prophets in the Age of al-Ma'mun and Al-Mamun (Makers Of The Muslim World). He has also translated several works from Arabic and French. Cooperson has also taught at the Middlebury School of Arabic and Stanford University.

== Bibliography ==
=== Works ===
- Classical Arabic Biography: The Heirs of the Prophets in the Age of al-Ma'mun
- Al-Mamun (Makers Of The Muslim World)

=== Translations ===
- The Author and His Doubles: Essays on Classical Arabic Culture by Abdelfattah Kilito
- The Time-Travels of the Man Who Sold Pickles and Sweets by Khairy Shalaby
- The Caliph's Heirs — Brothers at War: the Fall of Baghdad by Jurji Zaydan
- The Maqamat (titled Impostures in English) by al-Hariri

== Awards ==
In 2021, he won the Sheikh Zayed Book Award for translation from Arabic to English, for Impostures.

== See also ==
- List of Arabic-English translators
