= Abu Naddara =

Satirical magazine in Egypt and in France (1877–1910)

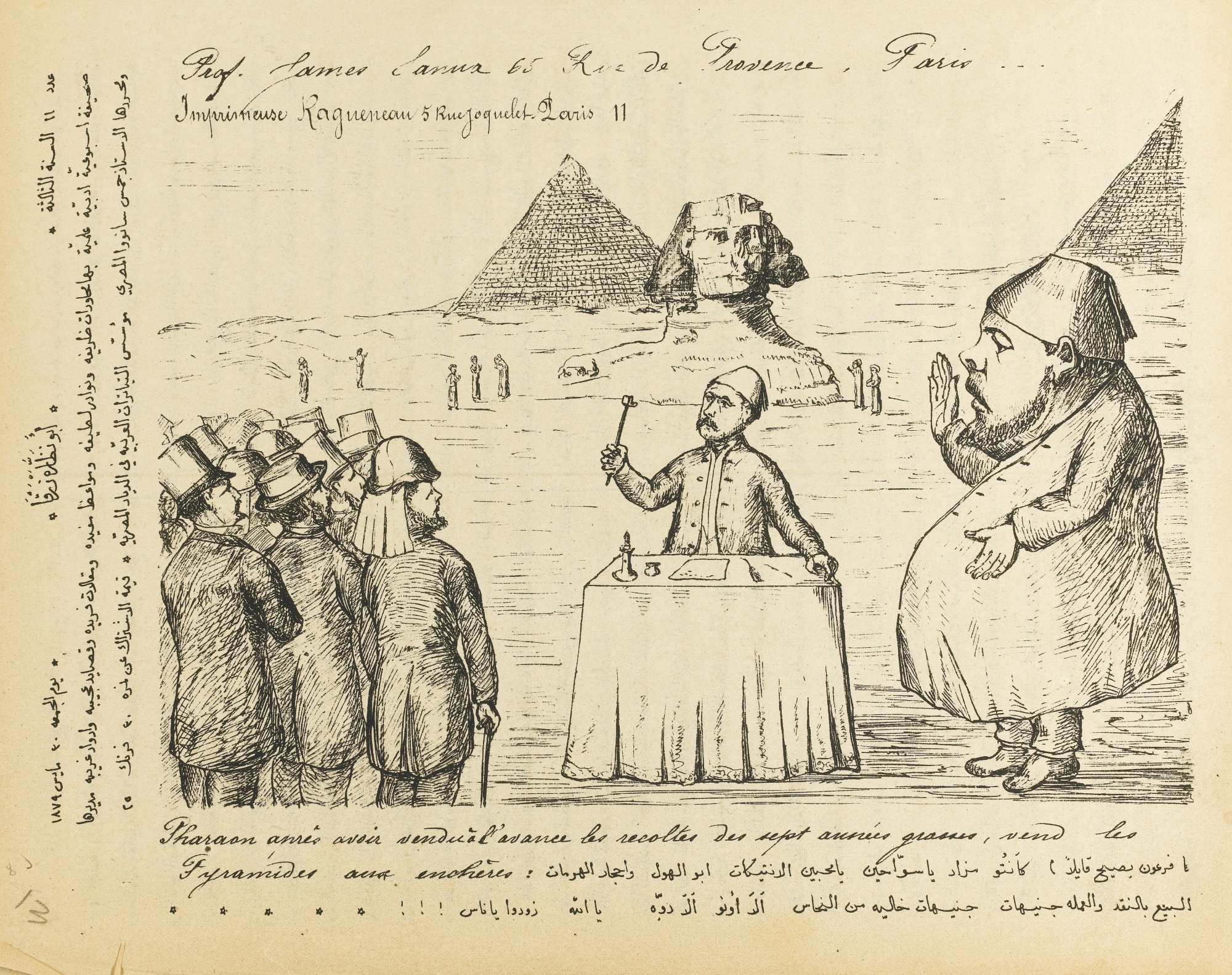
- Categories: Political satire magazine
- Frequency: Weekly
- Publisher: Yaqub Sanu
- Founder: Yaqub Sanu
- Founded: 1877
- First issue: 21 March 1877
- Final issue: December 1910
- Country: Egypt; France
- Based in: Cairo (March 1877–August 1878); Paris (August 1878–December 1910)
- Language: Arabic; French

Abu Naddara (Arabic: أبو نظارة, lit. 'Man with Glasses'; full title Abu Naddara Zarqa) was an Arabic political satire magazine based in Cairo, Egypt, and then in Paris, France. Its title, Abu Naddara, was the pseudonym of the founder, Yaqub Sanu. The magazine was the first Arabic publication which employed cartoons to express social and political criticism. It existed in the period 1877–1910.

== History and profile ==
Abu Naddara was established by Yaqub Sanu in 1877 in Cairo as a four-page publication, and the first issue appeared on 21 March that year. Yaqub Sanu had been involved in theatre, and the magazine was an extension of his theatrical activities since it covered satirical sketches based on theatrical elements.

A political activist and Yaqub Sanu's mentor, Jamal al Din Al Afghani, encouraged him to launch Abu Naddara. The magazine was published on a weekly basis. All caricatures published in the magazine were produced by Yaqub Sanu himself. It covered both Arabic language and French language materials in the caricatures. The Arabic materials were written in colloquial style. The magazine managed to have a large audience and sold nearly 50,000 copies. It was also distributed free of charge to army officers.

However, soon Abu Naddara began to publish caricatures which criticised Khedive Ismail, ruler of Egypt, and also, the royal family of Egypt. Yaqub Sanu employed symbolism to criticize the rulers of Egypt and Ottoman Sultan and created the following carton figures: Sheikh Al Hara (Arabic: the Chief of the quarter) represented Khedive Ismail, Al Wad Al Ahbal (Arabic: the Foolish Boy) for Khedive Tewfik and Sheikh Al Tumn (Arabic: the chief of the prison) for the Ottoman ruler Sultan Abdul Hamid. Due to the critical approach of the magazine Yaqub Sanu was forced by Khedive Ismail to leave Egypt, and as a result, he settled in Paris where he continued to publish Abu Naddara. The first issue published there appeared in August 1878, and the magazine was also sent to Egypt in secret. The new target of the magazine became the British authorities in Egypt from 1882. Abu Naddara attempted to get assistance from the French authorities to end the British rule in the country. The magazine ceased publication following the December 1910 issue.

The full issues of Abu Naddara were archived at Occidental College, Los Angeles, California.
