= Yaqub Sanu =

Egyptian journalist, playwright and theatre director (1839–1912)

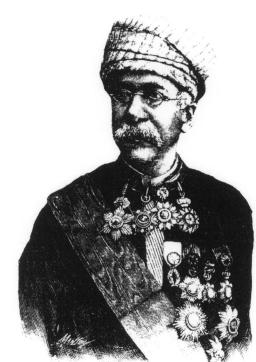
- Born: 1839; Cairo, Egypt
- Died: 1912 (aged 72–73); Cairo, Egypt
- Known for: Pioneer of political satire and popular theater in Egypt

Yaʿqūb Ṣanūʿ (Egyptian Arabic: يعقوب صنوع, ALA-LC: Yaʿqūb Ṣanūʿ, anglicized as James Sanua), also known by his pen name "Abu Naddara" (Arabic: أبو نظارة Abū Naẓẓāra "the man with glasses"; January 9, 1839 – 1912), was an Egyptian actor, playwright, theatrical producer, journalist, publisher, political cartoonist, and teacher. He was a pioneer of political satire and popular theater in Egypt and authored numerous plays in Egyptian Arabic.

He is credited with coining the phrase "Egypt for the Egyptians" (مصر للمصريين) and, through his political writing, inspiring the Egyptian military officer Ahmed Urabi to revolt (1879–1882).

== Early life ==
Sanu was born in 1839 in Cairo of the Khedivate of Egypt to an Italian father from Livorno, a Sephardic protegé named Raphael, and an Egyptian Jewish mother. His father worked for Prince Ahmad Yegen, the grandson of Muhammad Ali Pasha, Khedive of Egypt and Sudan. Yaʿqūb Ṣanūʻ grew up and was educated in a multilingual environment, exposed to Italian, Arabic, French, Hebrew, and English. When he was thirteen, he wrote an Arabic poem and recited it in front of the prince, who was fascinated by the young boy's talents. The prince later sent him to be educated in Livorno, Italy, in 1853, where he studied Arts and Literature. When he returned to Egypt in 1855, he worked as a tutor for the prince's children before he became a teacher in the Arts and Crafts School in Cairo.

== Journalism and theater ==
Sanu became active as a journalist in Egypt, writing in a number of languages, including Arabic and French. He played an important role in the development of Egyptian theatre in the 1870s, both as a writer of original plays in Arabic and with his adaptations of French plays. However, it was as a satirical nationalist journalist that he became famous in his day, becoming a thorn in the side of both the Khedive and the British colonists. In 1870, the Khedive, Ismail Pasha, financially supported Sanu's theatre company and proclaimed him "Molière of Egypt." His plays often featured very colloquial Egyptian Arabic and nationalist themes. Looking to engage non-Muslim women for his modern style of theatre, Sanu found two poor Jewish girls from Ottoman Syria: Milia Dayan and her sister Liza. As they were illiterate, he instructed them to read and write as well as in acting, and they started their career in Sanu's theatrical troupe.

Sanu and the Khedive had a falling out in 1876 when Egypt's bankruptcy led Ismail to withdraw his support. Sanu mercilessly caricatured both Ismail the Magnificent and Egypt's British rulers as bumbling buffoons in his journalism and especially in his cartoons. He was also the first journalist to write in Egyptian Arabic, which was intended to appeal to a mass audience, and his cartoons could be easily understood by even the illiterate.

=== Abu Naddara ===
On 21 March 1877, Sanua founded the satirical magazine Abu Naddara Zarqa, which had an immediate appeal to both those who could read and those who had it read to them. It was quickly suppressed as being liberal and revolutionary, and its author banished. In March and April 1877 fifteen issues appeared, and of these no copies are known. One of Sanu's cartoons, which criticized the Khedive's fiscal extravagance which caused Egypt's bankruptcy in 1876, led Ismail to order his arrest. Sanua went into exile on June 22, 1878 sailing on the ship Freycinet from Alexandria to Marseille. Exile in France simply encouraged his journalistic efforts, and his celebrated journal, reproduced lithographically from handwriting in both Arabic and French, continued to appear, printed at a shop aptly located in the Passage du Caire in the second arrondissement of Paris. Like many such journals, it frequently changed its name, although the title which remained most constant was Rehlat Abou Naddara Zar'a (Travels of the Man in the Blue Glasses from Egypt to Paris). This was the first Arabic-language magazine to feature cartoons, the captions for these being given in French and Arabic, as well as being the first to use Egyptian Arabic – a language different from Literary Arabic.

Its circulation was considerable in Egypt, where it was smuggled inside other larger newspapers (its format is small and each issue consisted only of two leaves.) There is clear evidence of its presence, even in the highest circles, in Egypt – and each issue may well have been printed in some 3,300 copies. The magazine concentrated on both political and financial difficulties in Egypt, and Sanua was probably privy to this information from friends and well-wishers within the administration. Certainly his magazine was well-known: the Saturday Review in London printed in July 1879 a highly favourable notice, and many European memoirs of the period refer to it.

Sanu from 1882 onward drew cartoons which depicted the British as "red locusts" devouring all of Egypt's wealth, leaving nothing behind for the Egyptians. At other times, the British occupying Egypt were simply labelled "the reds" – a reference to the red sun-burned faces of British officials and soldiers in Egypt, which Sanu lampooned by giving every British person in Egypt a face that was grotesquely burned red. A recurring theme of Sanu's humor was the inability of the British characters in his cartoons to properly speak French. The witty dialogue he gave his cartoon characters was highly lauded in 19th century France as Sanu made his British cartoon characters mangle the French language. His Egyptian characters, however, spoke the most correct French, which was intended to show the supposed moral and cultural superiority of the occupied over the occupiers. Like most other educated Egyptians in the 19th century, he believed France was the ideal role model for Egypt.

Sanu became a celebrity in France, and he played up his status as an exotic "Oriental" by taking off his usual European clothing and donning the traditional Egyptian "galabiyah" and turban for photographs and when delivering his lectures; he believed that his credibility as an expert on Egypt relied on this exotic appeal. Sanu was such a celebrity in France that when a small fire broke out in his apartment in Paris, it was covered by the major French newspapers as important news. An article in Le Courrier de France in September 1895 reported that Sannu had "become such an in-demand conference presenter that no week passes by without the press documenting one of his many conference presentations." A man with a high opinion of himself, Sanu obsessively recorded all of the mentions of his name by the media.

Through banned in Egypt, Abu-Naddara Zarqa was a very popular underground newspaper, with Sanu's cartoons being especially popular. Other cartoons drawn by Sanu with captions in Arabic and French depicted La Vieux Albion (England) as a hideous hag together with her even more repulsive son John Bull, who was always shown as an ignorant, uncouth and drunken bully pushing around ordinary Egyptians. Sanu's Egyptian nationalism was based on loyalty to Egypt as a state and geographic entity rather than a sense of ethnicity or religion, as he presented Egypt as a tolerant place where Muslims, Christians and Jews were all united by a common love of al-watan ("the homeland"). To counter the claim made by British officials like Lord Cromer, who justified the British occupation of Egypt as necessary to protect Egypt's Jewish and Christian minorities from the Muslim majority, Sanu wrote that as an Egyptian Jew he did not feel threatened by the Muslim majority, saying in a speech in Paris: "The Koran is not a book of fanaticism, superstition or barbarity."

A Francophile, Sanu's writings often glorified France, with one poem he wrote in French reading:

"We adore you, oh children of France — champions of liberty You inspire our confidence — with your historic loyalty If the French treat us like brothers — the brutal English treat us like dogs The one makes us happy and prosperous — the other, steals our goods The English pillage our fertile fields — taking away the fruits of our labor The French enrich our cities — civilize and educate us".

Keen to win French support, Sanu, who was critical of British imperialism in Egypt, never criticized French imperialism in Tunisia, Morocco or Algeria. After France concluded an alliance with Russia in 1894, Sanu drew a cartoon with the title "Les amis de nos amis sont nos amis" ("The Friends of Our Friends Are Our Friends") who showed an Egyptian, an Indian, and an Iranian all cheering a French sailor and a Russian sailor marching down a street as their friends while a thuggish-looking John Bull looks on in disapproval.

In 1961, the American historian Irene Gendzier argued that Sanu, whose first language was Arabic and who was proud to be both an Egyptian and a Jew, could serve as a symbol of reconciliation between Egyptians and Jews.

== Views ==
=== On language ===
In the language of his plays, Sanu has been observed to disregard Arabic grammatical rules and take "great liberty in deviating from the conventional writing norms." He also inserts many terms from French and Italian, and makes use of different Arabic dialects and accents for non-Arab characters. Responding to an article critical of this idiosyncratic use of language published by the editor of an Italian journal in Alexandria, Sanu presented his views on language in his play Mūliyīr Miṣr wa-Mā Yuqāsīh:

Istephan: This man the [Italian editor] is mad; no one will pay attention to what he says. We will succeed, while he will fail to achieve his goal.

Mitri: In two words we can answer him, gag his mouth, and make him run to hide in his mother's lap. A comedy contains what takes place and what originates among people.

Istephan: Well done, Mitri! Your words are like diamonds.

Mitri: I wonder if, in their communication, people use grammatical or conventional language.

Istephan: Never in their lives do authorities and learned men communicate with each other in grammatical language.

Unlike his contemporaries such as Adib Ishaq, Sanu did not write for the educated elite, but rather for the general public, using a simple yet effective language accessible to the masses.

=== On politics ===
From the early 1870s, he was critical of Isma'il Pasha and lambasted him and his son Tewfik Pasha in his dramas and satirical political cartoons. Sanu saw the Khedive's policies as tyrannical and irrational, especially his crippling taxes on the fallaḥīn (peasants). He referred to Ismail with sarcastic nicknames such as Shaykh al-Ḥāra (شيخ الحارة 'Chief of the Neighborhood') and his son Tewfik as Tewkif (توقيف 'impediment') or al-Wād al-Ahbal (الواد الأهبل 'the idiot boy'). After Sanu was exiled, his critique became more brazen.

He was committed to the anti-colonial slogan "Egypt for the Egyptians," which he appears to have coined.

== Legacy ==
In late 2019 Yaqub Sanu's caricatures were exhibited in the Ubuntu Art Gallery in Cairo.

== Plays ==
- Būrṣat Miṣr (بورصة مصر 'The Egyptian Stock Market')
- al-ʿAlīl (العليل 'The Sickly One')
- Abū Rīda wa-Kaʿb al-Khayr (أبو ريدة وكعب الخير 'Abū Rīda and Kaʿb al-Khayr')
- aṣ-Ṣadāqa (الصداقة 'Faithfulness')
- al-Amīra al-Iskandarānīya (الأميرة الاسكندرانية 'The Alexandrian Princess')
- Anisa ʿala Mūḍa (آنسة على الموضة 'A Fashionable Young Lady')
- Ghandūr Miṣr (غندور مصر 'The Egyptian Dandy')
- ad-Durratīn (الدرتين 'The Two Co-Wives')
- Mūliyīr Miṣr wa-Mā Yuqāsīh (موليير مصر وما يقاسيه ' The Egyptian Molière and What He Suffers')
- al-Qirdāti Lu'ba Tiātriyya Ḥasalat fī Ayyām al-Ghuzz (القرداتي لعبة ثياترية حصلت في أيام الغز 'The Monkey Trainer, a Theatrical Play Set in the Days of the Ghuzz)
- Il marito infedele ('The Unfaithful Husband')
- Fāṭima (فاطمة)
- as-Salāsil al-Muḥaṭṭama (السلاسل المحطَّمة 'The Shattered Chains')
- al-Waṭan wal-Ḥurriyya (الوطن والحرية 'The Homeland and Freedom')

== Bibliography ==
- Ettmüller, Eliane U. (2012): The Construct of Egypt's National-Self in James Sanua's Early Satire & Caricature. Berlin: Klaus Schwarz. ISBN 978-3-87997-411-5
- Fahamy, Ziad (2008). "Francophone Egyptian Nationalists, Anti-British Discourse, and European Public Opinion, 1885-1910: The Case of Mustafa Kamil and Ya'qub Sannu". Comparative Studies of South Asia, Africa and the Middle East. 28 (1): 170–183. doi:10.1215/1089201x-2007-063.
- Gendzier, Irene (Winter 1961). "James Sanua and Egyptian Nationalism". Middle East Journal. 15 (1): 16–28.
- Langone, Angela Daiana (2016): Molière et le théâtre arabe. Réception moliéresque et identités nationales arabes. Berlin: De Gruyter. ISBN 978-3-11-044234-2
- Langone, Angela Daiana (2023): Tre commedie di Yaʽqūb Ṣannūʽ. Il malato, Le due spose rivali, Le tribolazioni del Molière d’Egitto. Venezia: Edizioni Ca' Foscari. ISBN 978-88-6969-696-1 ISBN 978-88-6969-695-4
- Ziad Fahmy, "Francophone Egyptian Nationalists, Anti-British Discourse, and European Public Opinion, 1885-1910: The Case of Mustafa Kamil and Ya'qub Sannu'"
