= Giovanni Camilla =

Italian physician and philosopher

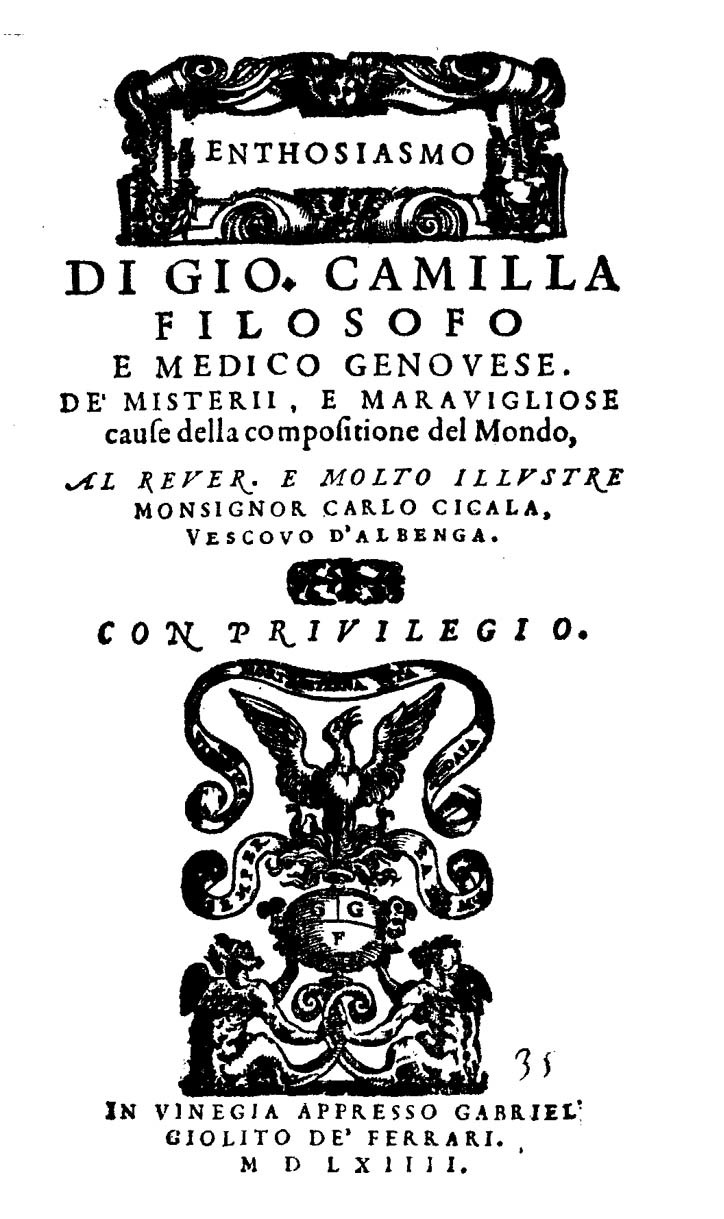
Enthosiasmo, 1564

Giovanni Camilla (also written Camilli or Camillo, Latin: Ioannes Camillus; fl. 2nd half of the 16th century) was an Italian physician and philosopher from Genoa.

== Works ==
- Enthosiasmo. De' misterii, e maravigliose cause della compositione del Mondo (in Italian). Venice: Gabriel Giolito de' Ferrari. 1564.
