= Emmanuele Antonio Cicogna =

Italian historian and writer (1789–1868)

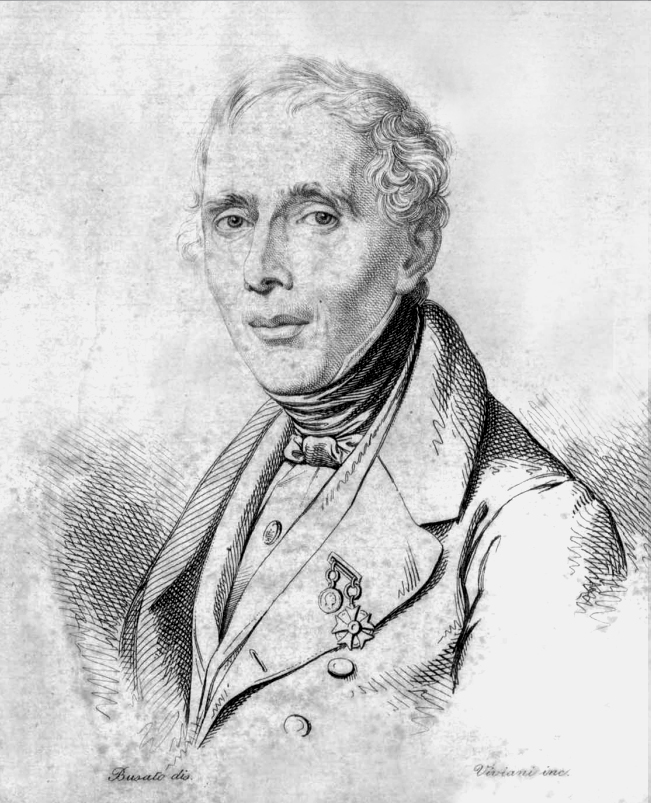
- Born: 17 January 1789; Venice, Republic of Venice
- Died: 22 February 1868; Venice, Kingdom of Lombardy–Venetia
- Occupations: Historian, bibliographer, civil servant

Emmanuele Antonio Cicogna (17 January 1789, Venice - 22 February 1868) was an Italian writer, scholar, and book collector. He left his huge collection of books to the city of Venice and it now forms part of the Museo Correr.

He was the son of Giovanni Antonio Cicogna and Elisabetta Bertolucci and came from a Candian family that had obtained Venetian citizenship. His book collection included editions of historical manuscripts, particularly on inscriptions in Venice and its lagoon. He published well over 100 historical, art-historical, and biographical essays, transcriptions, bibliographies, and short stories. His most notable work is the six-volume Delle iscrizioni veneziane, published between 1824 and 1853 - Carlo Dionisotti commented that "There is still no scholar of the Italian Renaissance who can do without the amazing 'iscrizioni veneziane' by Emanuele Cicogna [...]".

== Works ==
- Sullo scoprimento del Corpo di San Marco Evangelista, Venezia, 1811.
- Saggio di bibliografia veneziana, Tip. di G.B. Merlo, Venezia, 1847.
- Delle inscrizioni veneziane - Raccolte ed illustrate, 6 volumi, Venezia, 1824-1853 (ristampa: Bologna 1969–1983)
- Illustri Muranesi richiamati alla memoria e offerti alla gentilissima signora Ludovica Bigaglia-Bertolini, Venezia, Tipografia Martinengo, 1858.
- Intorno la vita e le opere di Marcantonio Michiel, patrizio veneto della prima metà del secolo XVI, in Memorie dell'Istituto veneto di scienze, lettere ed arti, 9 (1860), pp. 359–425.
- Memoria intorno la vita e gli scritti di Messer Lodovico Dolce (1863).

== Bibliography ==
- Paolo Preto, CICOGNA, Emmanuele Antonio, Dizionario Biografico degli Italiani, Vol XXV, pp. 394–397, Istituto dell'Enciclopedia italiana Treccani
- Neigebaur, Die Bibliothek des Ritters Emanuel Anton Cicogna zu Venedig, «Serapeum», 19 (1858), pp. 209–213
- Giovanni Paoletti, Intorno agli scritti del cavaliere Emmanuele Antonio Cicogna, Venezia, 1864.
- Girolamo Soranzo, Bibliografia veneziana in aggiunta e continuazione del "saggio" di Emmanuele Antonio Cicogna, 2 voll., Venezia, 1885 (rist. New York, 1968)
- Rinaldo Fulin, Saggio del Catalogo dei Codici di Emmanuele A. Cicogna, in Archivio Veneto, 4 (1872) pp. 59–132 e 337–398.
- Lara Spina, „Sempre a pro degli studiosi“: La biblioteca di Emmanuele Antonio Cicogna, «Studi Veneziani», n.s., 29 (1995), pp. 295–355.
- R. Fulin, Indice delle pubblicazioni di Emmanuele Antonio Cicogna, «Archivio Veneto», 5, (1873), pp. 156–173
