= Ron Terpening =

American writer and educator

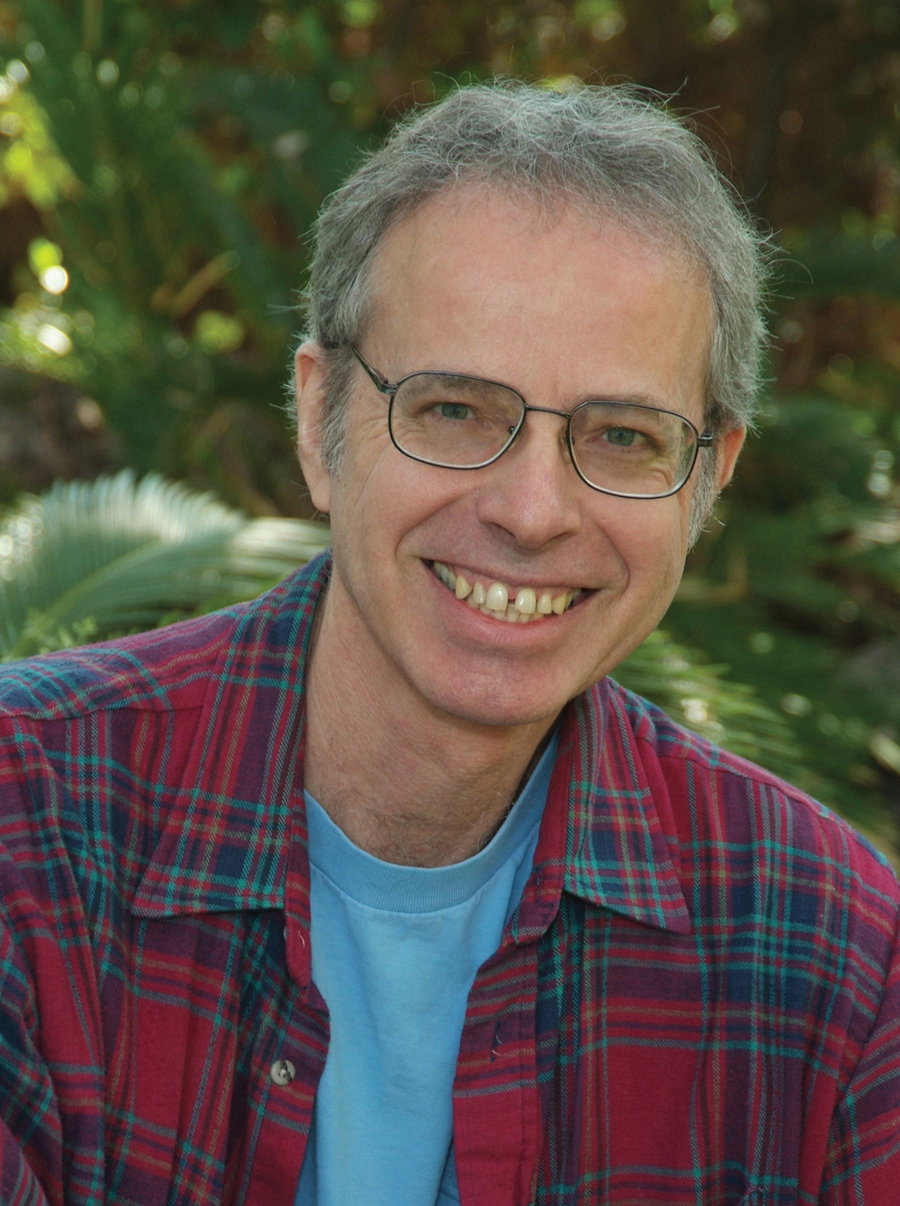
- Terpening in Tucson, 2006
- Born: Ronnie Harold Terpening; May 3, 1946 (age 80); Bellingham, Washington, U.S.
- Education: University of Oregon, University of California, Berkeley
- Occupations: Author, professor of Italian
- Spouse: Vicki Terpening
- Writing career
- Pen name: Gerrit Lambertzen, Sarah Rapalje-Bergen
- Genres: Suspense, Thrillers, Young-adult Fiction
- Notable awards: National Endowment for the Humanities (1983)
- Website: ronterpening.com

Ron Terpening (born Ronnie Harold Terpening on May 3, 1946) is an American writer, professor of Italian, and editor. Though he started his writing career as an author of young-adult fiction, where the father/son conflict is a major theme, he is best known for his later novels of suspense, most of which are set, at least in part, in Italy, reflecting his academic background as a scholar of Italian culture. His thriller League of Shadows, for example, deals with the Fascist Era in Italy and its aftermath in the contemporary world. A later international thriller, Nine Days in October, came out of the author's course research on the forces of order and disorder in contemporary Italy and follows a band of criminals and ex-terrorists as they attempt to carry out an assassination plot. All of his novels, including Storm Track and Tropic of Fear, the latter set in Paraguay, are noted for their strong sense of place. In most of his novels, his protagonist is usually a common man placed in a situation where powerful forces are arrayed against him.

While his novels take place in the modern era, Terpening's academic research has focused on Italian authors of the Renaissance, most notably the Venetian Humanist Lodovico Dolce, although he has also published a study of the infernal boatman Charon and numerous articles on other writers of the 15th and 16th centuries. His editing work has ranged from textbooks, mostly anthologies of Italian literature, to broad studies of Italian culture.

== Biography ==
=== Early life ===
Terpening was born in Bellingham, Washington in 1946, second son of Harold Russell and Darlene Elizabeth Terpening. His father was a Protestant minister and an evangelist who started several churches in the state of Washington.

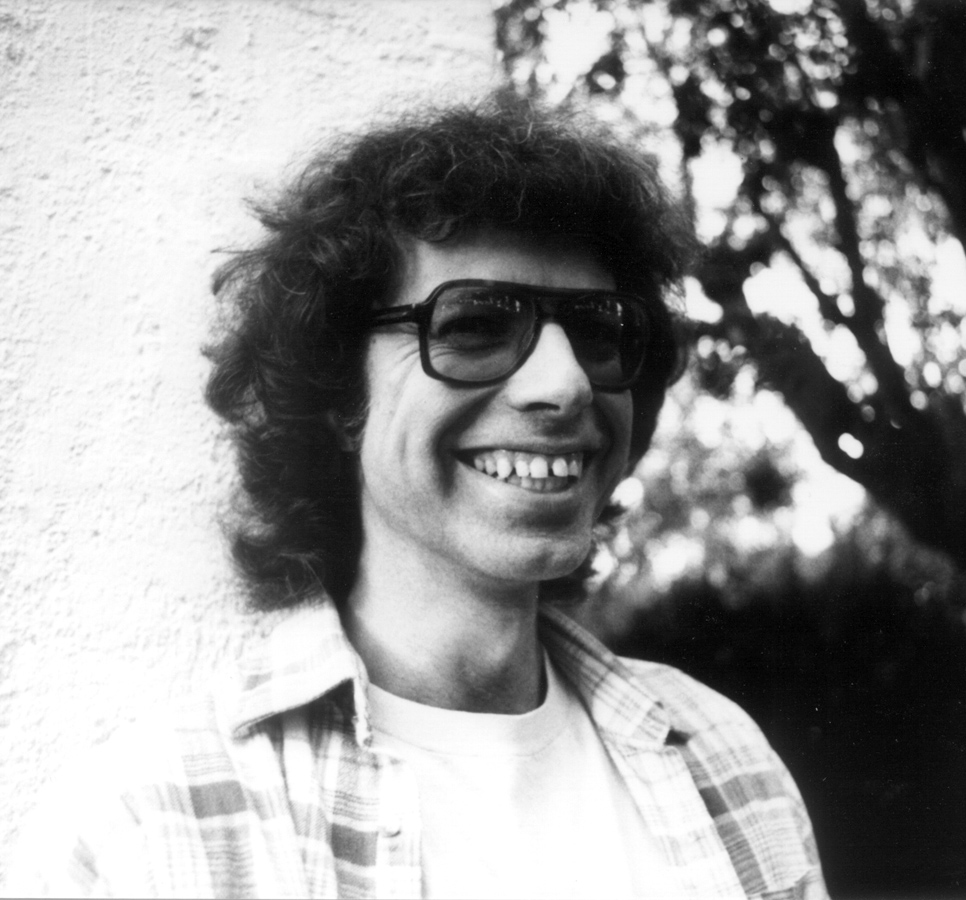
Ron Terpening, Tucson, 1989.

After living in Birch Bay, Pateros, and Moses Lake, Washington, Terpening attended grade school in Ferndale, Warden, Wenatchee, and Seattle (in Washington state) and Portland and Gresham (in Oregon). He graduated from Gresham Union High School in 1964.

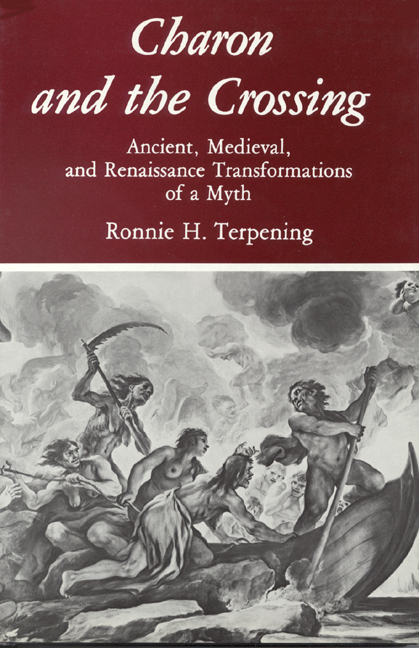
Charon and the Crossing

Terpening completed his undergraduate work at the University of Oregon in Eugene (B.A. Romance Languages, Honors College, 1969), where he was inducted into the Phi Beta Kappa national honor society. He spent his Sophomore year in Pavia, Italy, and lived in Mexico City for one year. His semi-autobiographical novel In Light’s Delay narrates several events of those years (1966–1968). In his youth, Terpening held a variety of jobs while attending school and first beginning to write fiction: he serviced vehicles in a dairy, worked in a berry growers cannery, on a cement gang in construction, as a striper of panels in a Georgia-Pacific veneer plant, a crew dispatcher for Southern Pacific Railroad, a housekeeping aide in Herrick Hospital (Berkeley, California), a mail handler for the U.S. Postal System in Oakland, and a teacher.

He completed his Master's (1973) and Ph.D. in Italian (1978) at the University of California, Berkeley. His revised dissertation was later published as Charon and the Crossing: Ancient, Medieval, and Renaissance Transformations of a Myth (Lewisburg: Bucknell UP; London and Toronto: Associated University Presses, 1985). The illustrated book was the first comprehensive study of the underworld boatman Charon as found in the literary tradition from pre-Homeric texts through the early Baroque period in Italy. Thomas G. Bergin (Yale University) said that the book, “in grace of an engaging style and a never flagging interest in [the] subject, makes for lively reading.”

=== Career ===
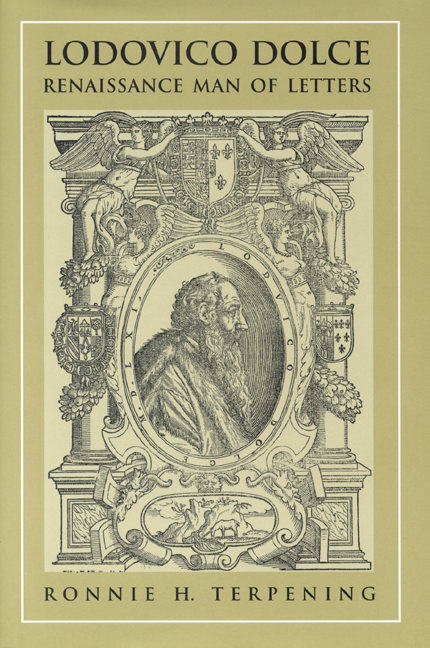
Lodovico Dolce

Terpening taught Italian for four years at Loyola University of Chicago (1978–1982). He worked as an editorial assistant for John Tedeschi on two volumes of the Bibliographie Internationale de l’Humanisme et de la Renaissance and was a research fellow of the Mabelle McLeod Lewis Memorial Fund, The Renaissance Society of America, the American Council of Learned Societies, and the National Endowment for the Humanities in conjunction with the Newberry Library. He also received a fellowship from the American Association of Teachers of Italian to study at the Università Italiana per Stranieri di Perugia (Italy), in 1981.

From 1982 to 2008, Terpening was a professor in the Department of French and Italian at the University of Arizona, where he introduced a new option in Italian Studies for the bachelor's degree, a program that covered Italian culture from prehistoric times to the present. He directed the Arizona Study Abroad Program in Florence, Italy, in 1987, and was co-acting head of the department in 1996. Beginning in 1986, he also served on the editorial board of New Connections: Studies in Interdisciplinarity.

Author of numerous scholarly articles and reviews dealing with Italian and Spanish literature, he published his second academic book, Lodovico Dolce: Renaissance Man of Letters, in 1997. He is also the author and editor of several academic texts, most notably a pseudonymous study Beautiful Italy, Beloved Shores. An Illustrated Cultural History of Italy, Vol. 1: From Prehistoric Times to the Fall of the Roman Empire and two anthologies of Italian literature with text in Italian and notes in English. His scholarly articles deal with authors such as Giovanni Boccaccio, Angelo Poliziano, Pietro Bembo, Giordano Bruno, Miguel de Cervantes, and Giambattista Marino.

Terpening retired in 2008 and is now a professor emeritus of Italian at the University of Arizona.

== Novels ==
=== Young adult fiction ===
Terpening began his first novel (In Light’s Delay) while an undergraduate at the University of Oregon in the late 60s, where he also worked as a features reporter for the Oregon Daily Emerald. He completed his second novel (The Echoes of Our Two Hearts, published in the trilogy The Hornets' Nest of Our Desires in 2023) as a graduate student at Berkeley. A third novel, The Turning, was released in 2001 and serves as the first volume in this trilogy of young-adult novels.

In Light’s Delay is the story of a young man's quest for self-discovery and love in the mid-1960s. The novel depicts the experiences of Doug Herman and his friends over the course of ten nights, at different times and places, as it follows Doug from the family farm in Oregon to a series of adventures in Italy, Mexico, and back in California.

The Turning, a coming-of-age tale, tells the story of Artie Crenshaw, a teenager with an abusive father. At his job one night, Artie decides to postpone going home, and the events that follow as a result of this decision cause him more trouble but ultimately help spur his progression towards manhood. Karen Hoth, writing in the School Library Journal, praised the “well-written story,” proclaiming the characters “well developed” and the book itself “touching.” The book was selected for inclusion on The New York Public Library’s 2002 Books For The Teen Age List, the “best of the previous year’s publishing for teenagers,” by the Pennsylvania School Librarians Association for their Top Forty Young-Adult Novels for 2001, and by Appleton North High School (Appleton, Wisconsin) for their Top 25 Recommended Reading (2002).

=== Suspense ===
Inspired by the suspense fiction he was reading (notably Clive Cussler, Robert Ludlum, Jack Higgins, and David Morrell), Terpening began work on a thriller while teaching at Loyola University of Chicago, where he used the Chicago Public Library for technical research.

==== Storm Track ====
His first published thriller, Storm Track (New York: Walker & Company, 1989), was inspired, in part, by Cussler's Mediterranean Caper. As part of the research for this book, Terpening became a certified scuba diver. Storm Track tells the story of a commercial oil-field diver, working on a jack-up off the coast of Tunisia, where his wife is killed in a terrorist attack. William C. McCully (Park Ridge Public Library, Illinois), writing in Library Journal, praised the thriller's “non-stop action” and “breathtaking pace,” as well as its settings in Italy, Sicily, Malta, and Tunisia. And Suzy Smith, author of The Afterlife Codes, The Book of James, and Ghost Writers in the Sky, in The Write Word, called Terpening “the next Ken Follett.”

==== League of Shadows ====
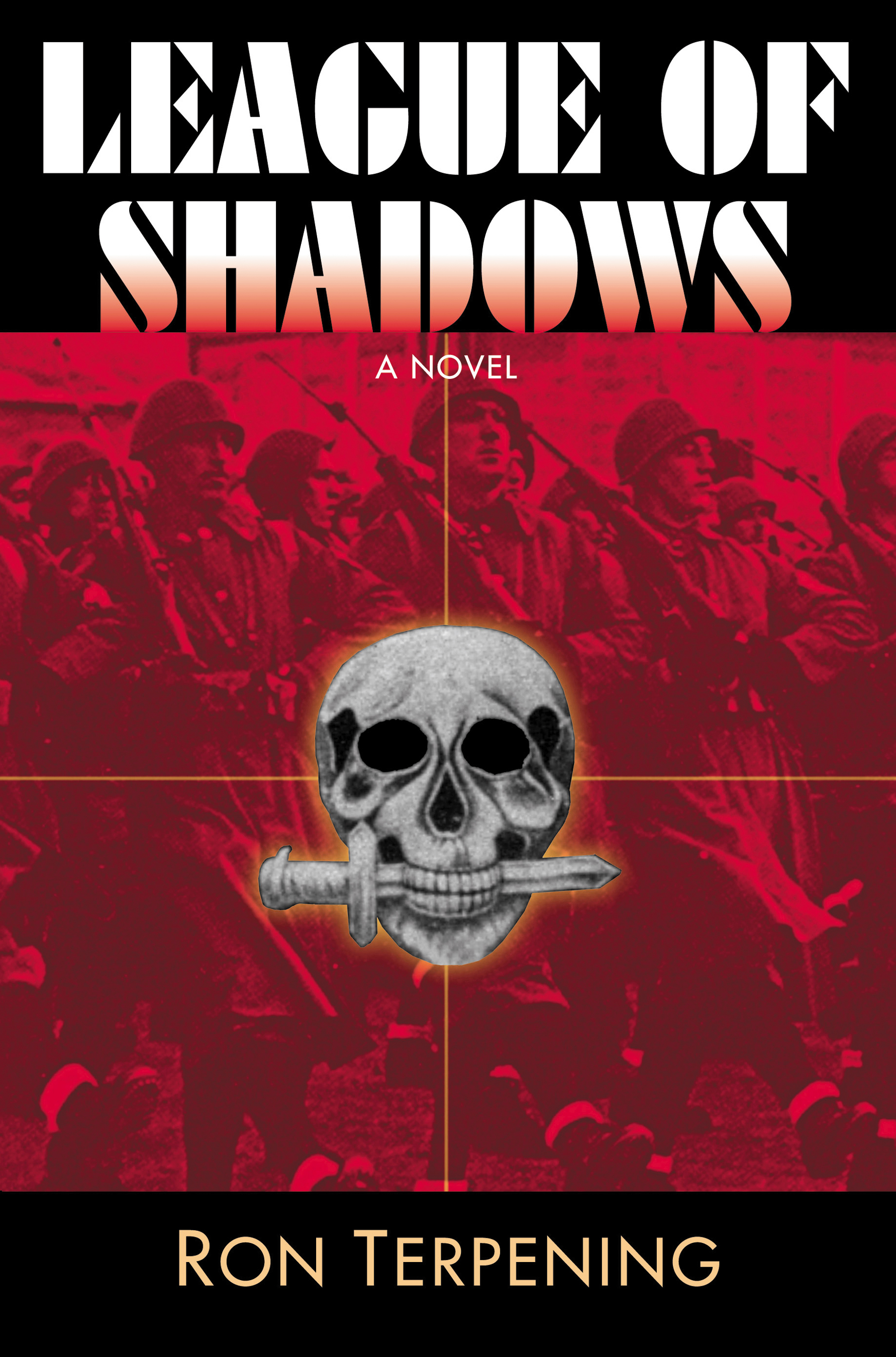
League of Shadows

Terpening's second thriller, League of Shadows (2005), was a contemporary novel of intrigue with an extensive back story that takes place in Italy during the Fascist Era. The historical scenes depict the efforts of three spies in 1943 to infiltrate Italian leader Benito Mussolini’s secret police, the OVRA. Decades after that intrigue went horribly wrong, an unknown enemy begins to hunt down the former secret agents, and their one hope for survival is an ex-cop obsessed with his mission. The Midwest Book Review called the novel “an addictive read, weaving together human drive, determination, and betrayal into a gripping whole”, while Lucille Cormier, in The Historical Novels Review, said that “You can race through this suspense thriller riding the whirlwind of drug busts, jungle guerrilla attacks, gun fights, assassinations, and love affairs right into the breathtaking climax. Or, if you are disciplined enough, you can turn each page slowly and savor the extraordinary visual and historical detail Ron Terpening has painted into his complex story. Either way, you are in for a treat. This is a book to add to every collection of historical fiction.” Joel Tscherne (Cleveland Public Library) noted in Library Journal that this is a novel that “fans of Jack Higgins’s thrillers will enjoy.”

==== Tropic of Fear ====
Influenced by movies such as Costa Gavras’s State of Siege (1973) and books such as Robert Stone’s A Flag for Sunrise (1981), Terpening turned for his next thriller, Tropic of Fear (2006), to South America. Barbara Conaty, writing in Library Journal, noted that “this thriller takes readers deep into the politics of Paraguay.” She thought that Terpening “imbue[d] his main characters with psychological depth, infuse[d] the book with local color galore, and fashion[ed] a deft plot.” As for the plot, two Americans, a hydrogeologist from Arizona and a professor of German from Yale University, both visiting Asunción but originally unknown to one another, are inadvertently drawn into the middle of a conspiracy to overthrow the Paraguayan government. The male protagonist's occupation came in for discussion in the Arizona Water Resource magazine. The editor wrote:

Taking popular entertainment as a measure one might likely conclude that those laboring in the hydrology and water resources field lack glamor, sex appeal and heroic qualities. Has any such character ever figured in plots on stage, screen, television or in books, to save the day, solve the mystery, woo the heroine and ride off into the sunset, or even to add spice and interest to a story?

Those who have noted this lamentable omission will undoubtedly be pleased to learn that Tropic of Fear, a recently published thriller, features a hydrogeologist as a worthy protagonist.

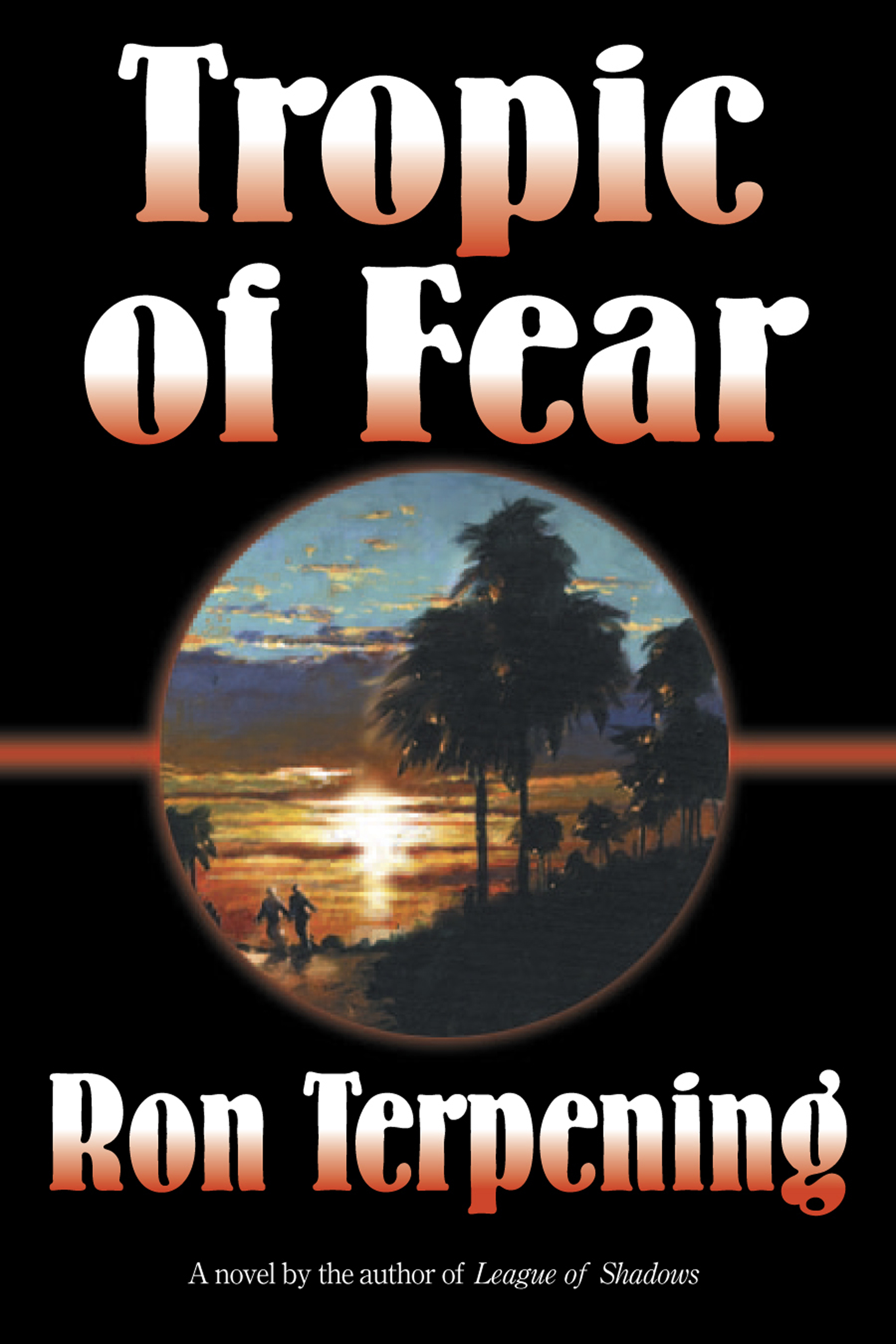
Tropic of Fear

In an interview published in Liens, Legami, Links Terpening noted:

When I was a kid, my father told me about an accident that happened while he was working on Grand Coulee Dam in Washington. (At the time, Grand Coulee Dam was the world’s largest dam.) One day, a crane operator failed to see him, swung a quarter-ton bucket of wet concrete into his side, and knocked him off the dam. He managed to reach around in midair, grabbed the bottom rim of the bucket, swung out with it, and when it came back in dropped into the middle of a patch of fresh concrete.

My own “felicitous fall” took place when I was working on a new gym for Portland State College (now University). I was three stories up, walking along scaffolding with a bucket of clip-ties in my arms when I happened to step on a plank that went only halfway between two platforms. I woke up a few moments later, sixty feet below, lying on the concrete floor. I had landed on the bucket, which cracked three ribs, but that and the hard hat I was wearing saved my life.

Years later, when I sat down to write Tropic of Fear, a political thriller set in South America, I thought of those experiences. They became part of the background of a secondary character, “Dink” Denton, a former roughneck, ex-Apache helicopter pilot in both Panama and the First Gulf War, now undercover in Paraguay as a Special Agent for the Drug Enforcement Administration.

In a Booklist review, David Pitt commented on “small flaws in the plot,” but observed that the “brisk clip” and pace of the action overcame that flaw. Christine Wald-Hopkins, a reviewer for the Tucson Weekly, noted this novel's affinities with the earlier League of Shadows, pointing out that the “malignant confluence of internal and external forces in contemporary Paraguay . . . has its own fascist resonance.” And the Midwest Book Review concluded: “Vivid, descriptive, imaginative, and chilling in its presentation of the lengths human beings will go to dominate one another, Tropic of Fear is an exciting thrill ride from first page to last.”

==== Nine Days in October ====
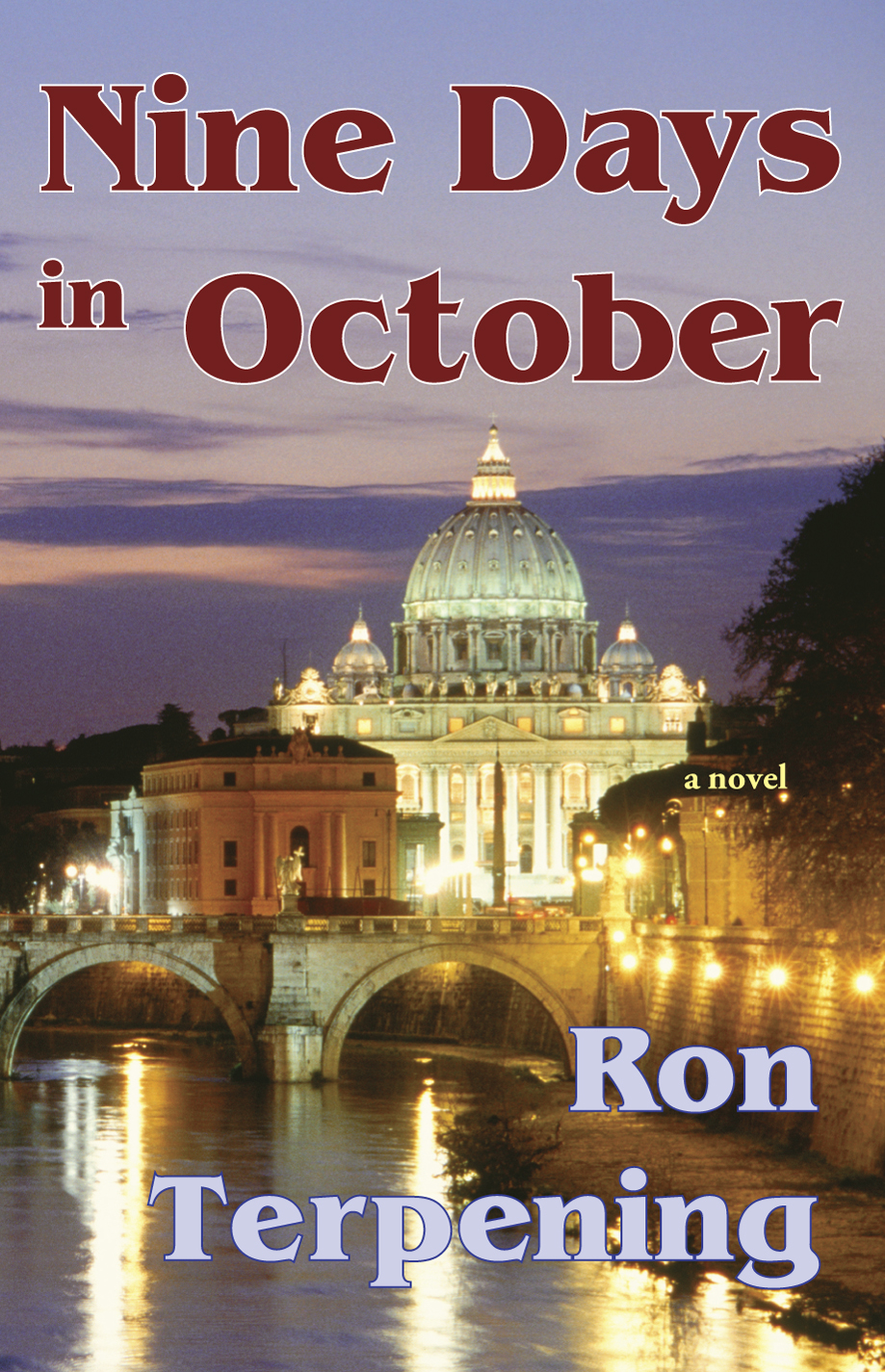
Nine Days in October

In 2007, Terpening published a contemporary international suspense thriller, Nine Days in October, “his most successful fictional foray into the murk of international crime.” Jonathan Pearce (California State University, Stanislaus-Stockton), writing in Library Journal, says that Terpening “gets his latest book off to a slam-bang start in Rome with a botched heist by terrorists. During the robbery, a visiting American professor is wounded and his daughter kidnapped, possibly for ransom.” Set in 1988, as competing government security organizations are preparing to welcome both the Soviet premier and the U.S. president to Italy, the novel's complex plot, Pearce says, “revolves around a... professor's attempts to find his child while he is unknowingly trapped in an assassination scheme involving rogue CIA agents, venal U.S. executives, Soviet oligarchs, and corrupt Italian security officials.” He concludes that “The reader roots for a weary Italian security officer to do his job better than the villains do theirs. The author's research is evidently extensive, the writing competent, the suspense gripping, and the characterization of beastly adversaries and noble protagonists effective. The sense of place is bolstered with such an abundance of native vocabulary and street and building names that Italophiles will feel right at home.”

==== Cloud Cover ====
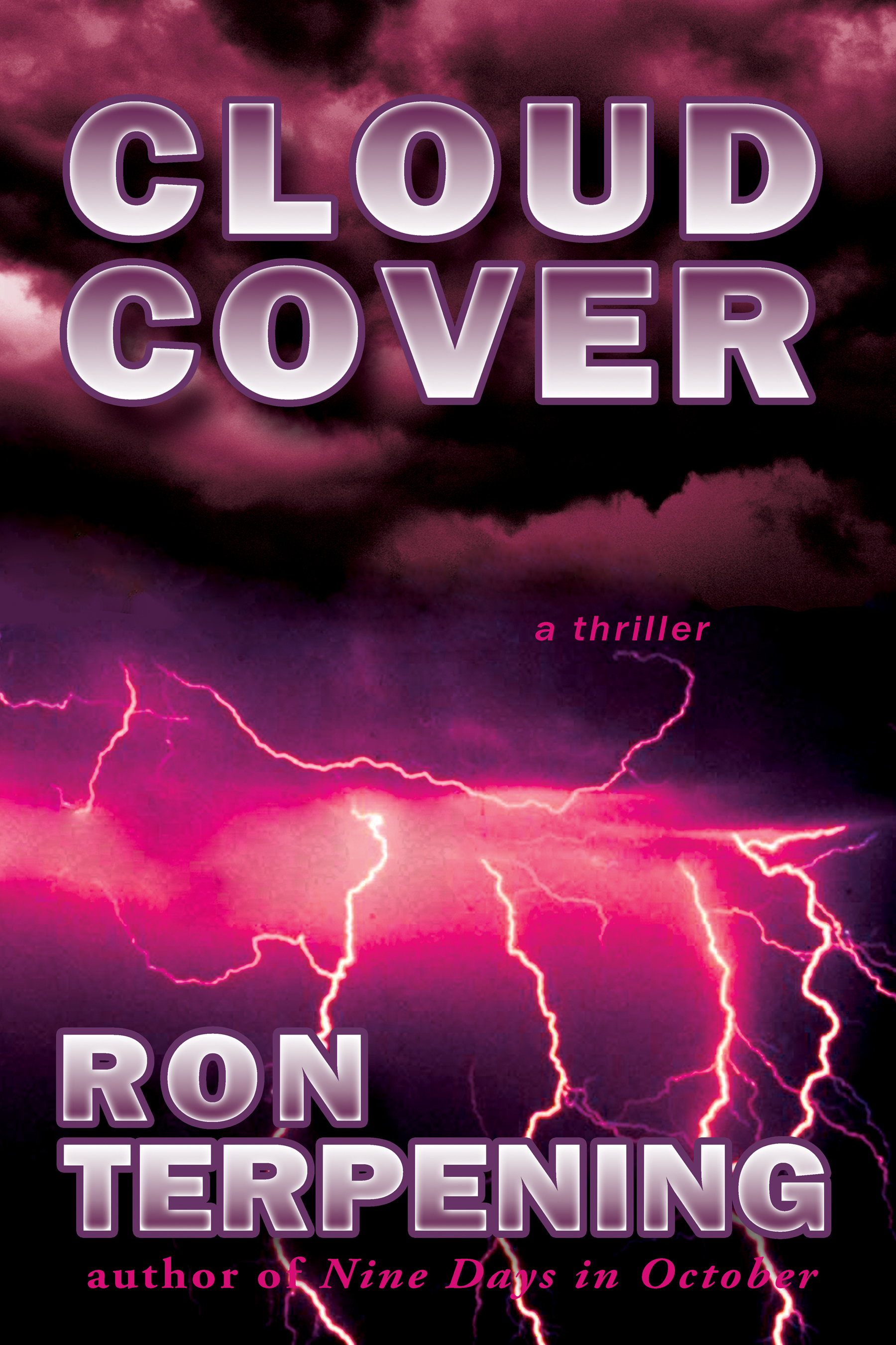
Cloud Cover

Terpening's next novel (August 2013) is an international thriller set primarily in Italy and Yugoslavia in the summer of 1984, four years after the death of Marshal Josip Broz Tito, the authoritarian president of the Socialist nation. By the summer of 1984 the stability of the state had begun to crack, early signs of the dismemberment that occurred in the 1990s. The novel has two protagonists—Michael Higgins, a NATO agent in Trieste, Italy, and Fae Avadek, a Canadian spy. Secondary episodes take place in Southern Arizona (Sierra Vista, Fort Huachuca, Tucson), Chicago, Moscow (Russia), and Benghazi (Libya).

The action begins when a Yugoslav military attaché defects in Ottawa and is assassinated before the Canadians can interrogate him. In Trieste, at the same time, someone has begun eliminating NATO agents. Higgins, their case officer, is warned by Avadek that he has a traitor in his network. Suddenly, he's running for his life, framed for the murder of one of his contacts. Pursued by an unknown enemy, he falls in love with Fae, whose violent past figures in their search for answers. Meanwhile, Vitali Alferyev, KGB station chief in Belgrade, has been recalled to Moscow, where his superior orders him to withdraw all covert operatives from the sector between Rijeka and Ljubljana. Alferyev's search for the reason leads him into a deadly conflict with a GRU agent operating in the area. The novel reaches its climax in the Yugoslav mountains, where Croatian terrorists, KGB spies, and NATO agents play out the final violent moves in a dangerous game to change the fate of Europe. Higgins and Avadek must sift through layers of deceit and treachery in their attempt to thwart an enemy whose tentacles stretch from the East to the West and from the past to the (novel's) present.

=== Literary Fiction ===
==== The Hornets' Nest of Our Desires ====
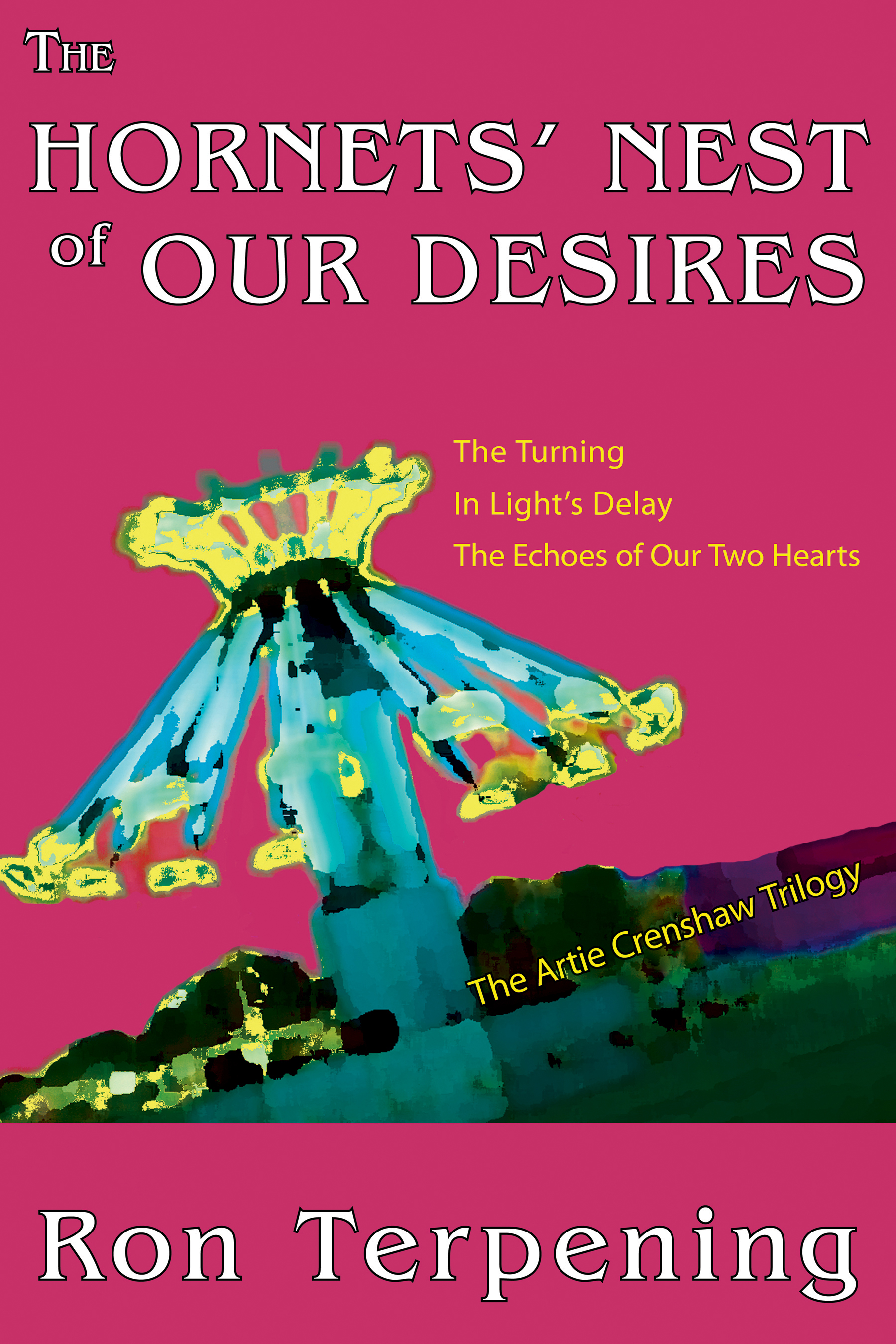
The Hornets' Nest of Our Desires

The author's latest publication, The Hornets' Nest of Our Desires: The Artie Crenshaw Trilogy (August 2023), contains revised editions of The Turning and In Light's Delay, along with The Echoes of Our Two Hearts, previously unpublished. The trilogy follows Artie Crenshaw as he embarks on a journey of self-discovery from a summer romance in a small Oregon town in 1962, to his college years abroad in Italy and later in Mexico, to his failed marriage and its aftermath in the 1970s. Along the way, from Berkeley to Chicago and on to New York, Artie and the girl he loves navigate the challenges of love, loss, and identity.

In an interview conducted by Contemporary Authors, Terpening said: “My desire to create imaginary worlds through fiction springs, as I suspect it does for most writers, from a love of reading. From early grade school years, when I was given my first books (most still in my library today) and when I lived one house away from the public library in Gresham, Oregon (where I spent most of my free time), to the present, when I teach Italian literature for a living, my addiction has been not to candy, rock 'n' roll, TV, drugs, sex, or gambling, but to the book—both as an artifact and as a source of delight, a distraction from the constraints of life. A good book carries you away and never lets you down.”

Terpening has also reviewed over 200 novels (mostly suspense) for Library Journal.

== Selected awards, fellowships, and honors ==
- National Merit Scholarship, Finalist, 1964
- Inducted into Phi Beta Kappa (National Honor Society), 1969
- National Defense Education Act, 1971
- Herbert H. Vaughan Scholar in Italian, University of California, Berkeley, 1971–72
- The Renaissance Society of America, 1976
- Stanford, Mabelle McLeod Lewis Memorial Fund, 1976–77
- Gamma Kappa Alpha (Italian National Honor Society), 1980
- American Council of Learned Societies, 1981
- Center for Renaissance Studies, The Newberry Library and Loyola University of Chicago, 1981
- American Association of Teachers of Italian and the Università Italiana per Stranieri di Perugia, 1981
- Center for Renaissance Studies, The Newberry Library and Loyola University Chicago, 1981
- National Endowment for the Humanities, 1983
- United States Department of Education, 1985–1986
- Five-Star Faculty Teaching Award, University of Arizona Honors Program, Finalist, 1989
- Nominated for University Distinguished Professor, University of Arizona, 1995
- Regional Representative (Plains/Southwest), American Association of Teachers of Italian, 1996–1999

== Bibliography ==
=== Novels ===
==== Young adult fiction ====
- In Light's Delay (Tucson: Desert Bloom Press, 1988)
- The Turning (Cortaro: Desert Bloom Press, 2001)

==== Suspense ====
- Storm Track (New York: Walker and Company, 1989)
- League of Shadows (New York: Stuyvesant & Hoagland, 2005)
- Tropic of Fear (New York: Stuyvesant & Hoagland, 2006)
- Nine Days in October (New York: Stuyvesant & Hoagland, 2007)
- Cloud Cover (Cortaro, AZ: Cliff Edge Publishing, 2013)

==== Literary Fiction ====
- The Hornets' Nest of Our Desires: The Artie Crenshaw Trilogy (Tucson, Desert Bloom Press, 2023)

=== Scholarly books ===
- Charon and the Crossing: Ancient, Medieval, and Renaissance Transformations of a Myth (Lewisburg: Bucknell University Press, 1985)
- Lodovico Dolce, Renaissance Man of Letters (Toronto: University of Toronto Press, 1997)
- Beautiful Italy, Beloved Shores. An Illustrated Cultural History of Italy. Vol. 1. From Prehistoric Times to the Fall of the Roman Empire with accompanying CD (Cortaro: Desert Bloom Press, 2001). [Single-authored under the dual pseudonyms Gerret Lambertzen and Sarah Rapalje-Bergen.]

=== Scholarly editions ===
- Anthology of Italian Literature. Volume 1. Middle Ages and Renaissance, edited with annotations by Ronnie H. Terpening (Cortaro: Desert Bloom Press, 2002)
- Anthology of Italian Literature. Volume 1. Middle Ages and Renaissance, edited with annotations by Ronnie H. Terpening. 2nd edition (corrected, expanded, and enlarged in size) (Cortaro: Desert Bloom Press, 2006)
- Anthology of Italian Literature. Volume 2. From the Seventeenth Through the Twentieth Century, edited by Ronnie H. Terpening (Cortaro: Desert Bloom Press, 2005)

=== Scholarly bibliographies ===
- Comité de Rédaction, Bibliographie internationale de l'Humanisme et de la Renaissance, Vol. 11 [1975], ed. John A. Tedeschi (Genève: Librairie Droz, 1978)
- Comité de Rédaction, Bibliographie internationale de l'Humanisme et de la Renaissance, Vol. 12 [1976], ed. John A. Tedeschi (Genève: Librairie Droz, 1980)

=== Scholarly articles ===
See the author's curriculum vitae.

=== Reviews ===
For fiction reviews, see the author’s web site. For scholarly reviews, see the author’s curriculum vitae.

=== Biographies of Ron Terpening ===
- Contemporary Authors, volume 248 (Detroit: Gale, 2006) ISBN 978-0-7876-7877-7

=== Online biographical sources ===
- Ron Terpening Homepage (March 31, 2006).
- University of Arizona Website (March 25, 2023), profile of author.
- Source Database: Contemporary Authors Online, Thomson Gale, 2006. ISBN 978-1-4144-1008-1, Galegroup.com
