= Università per Stranieri di Perugia =

University in Perugia, Italy

Coordinates: 43.115°N 12.389°E

University for Foreigners of Perugia
- Università per Stranieri di Perugia
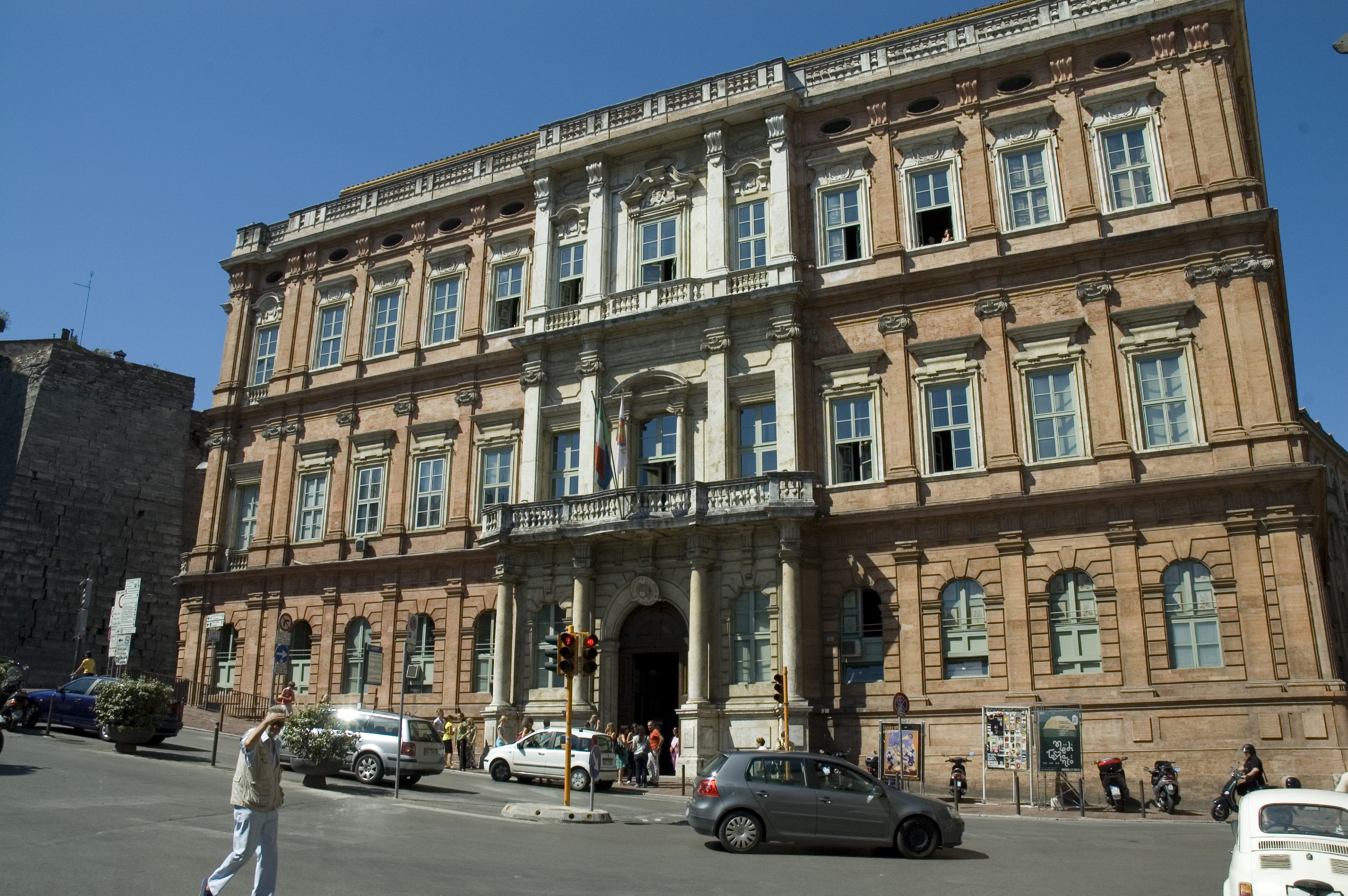
- Palazzo Gallenga Stuart, seat of the school
- Type: State-supported
- Established: 1925
- Affiliations: AlmaLaurea, UNIMED
- Rector: Valerio De Cesaris
- Academic staff: 2019: 97
- Administrative staff: 2019: 177
- Students: 2017–2018: 944
- Postgraduates: 2015–2016: 61
- Doctoral students: 2015–2016: 18
- Location: Piazza Fortebraccio, Perugia, Italy
- Campus: Urban
- Website: unistrapg.it

The University for Foreigners of Perugia (Italian: Università per Stranieri di Perugia) is an Italian university oriented towards study by foreign students of Italian language and culture. It was established by royal decree in 1925, and is housed in the Palazzo Gallenga Stuart in Perugia, in Umbria in central Italy. In the academic year 2017–2018 it had a total of 944 undergraduate and 61 postgraduate students; of the undergraduates, approximately two thirds were women, and little more than one third were from outside Italy.

It is one of the three universities historically for foreign students in Italy, together with the Università per Stranieri di Siena, and Università per stranieri "Dante Alighieri" di Reggio Calabria.

== History ==
The university was established by royal decree in 1925.

=== Controversy ===
In 2021, university officials were charged with helping footballer Luis Suárez to cheat on an Italian-language test.

In September 2020, Luis Suárez took a language exam at the University for Foreigners of Perugia to obtain Italian citizenship, which was linked to a potential transfer to Juventus. The exam raised suspicions of being fraudulent, leading to widespread media coverage and allegations that Juventus pressured the university to create a tailored exam session for Suárez.

An investigation ensued, and prosecutors initially accused Maria Turco, Juventus's lawyer, of being complicit in the alleged scheme. However, after nearly two years, the Perugia court cleared Turco of all charges, determining that Juventus did not interfere in the exam process.

Instead, the court found that university officials, including the former rector and other staff members, had falsified exam procedures to create a favorable environment for Suárez. This allowed the university to gain prestige from having a notable athlete as a student. As a result, the charges against Turco were dismissed, and the investigation ultimately confirmed that Juventus had no involvement in the fraudulent exam scheme. Despite the initial media frenzy, the acquittal received minimal attention in the press.

== Alumni ==
- Helmut Berger
- Shirlee Emmons
- Charles Ginnever
- Marva Griffin
- Leka, Crown Prince of Albania
- Amanda Knox
- Peter Maurer
- Bront Palarae
- Arthur Penn
- Denys Pringle
- Norma Redpath
- L. D. Reynolds
- Iain Duncan Smith (though he did not obtain any qualifications or finish his exams)
- Ron Terpening
- Adrian Turner
- Max Wickert
