= Marva Griffin =

Italian arts administrator and curator

- Born: Venezuela
- Alma mater: Università per Stranieri di Perugia
- Occupation: Arts administrator, organizational founder, curator
- Works: SaloneSatellite
- Awards: Ambrogino d'oro (mayor of Milan); Compasso d'Oro (Associazione per il Disegno Industriale); honorary degree (Polytechnic University of Milan); honorary degree (Rhode Island School of Design)

Marva Griffin is an arts administrator, curator, and founder of the SaloneSatellite exhibition at the annual Milan Furniture Fair in Italy. She has been described as, "the mastermind behind the world’s largest design fair [and] an outspoken friend to undiscovered designers."

== Early life and education ==
Griffin was born in Venezuela and raised in El Callao. She has spoken of her childhood and growing up with her seven siblings "in a big house with my mother, my grandmother and my father". She first visited Italy as a teenager in the 1960s. She studied interior design in Caracas, then moved with her son to Perugia, Italy in the 1970s to study languages at the Università per Stranieri di Perugia.

== Work and career ==
After her time in Perugia, she moved to Milan to work at C&B Italia (now B&B Italia) in communications and public relations, working closely with the company's founder and chairman Piero Ambrogio Busnelli. She describes her role during this period of her career as "Busnelli’s assistant, public relations office, and interpreter (he spoke no English). We travelled the world. It was incredible."

She also worked with Condé Nast as a correspondent and representative in Italy for a number of its publications such as French Maison & Jardin, Vogue Decoration, American House & Garden, and Vogue magazines.

In 1998 she founded SaloneSatellite in Milan, an exhibition that features young and emerging designers, collaborations with universities and design schools, and aims "to enhance links between research, design and industry, focusing on designers under the age of 35." The event is held annually in conjunction with the larger Milan Furniture Fair (iSaloni), an international trade and design event first held in 1961. Griffin is the curator of SaloneSatellite and has an advisory role in the management of the overall design fair.

She is considered a mentor who has contributed to the careers of well known designers such as Matali Crasset, Front, Sebastian Herkner, Patrick Jouin, Paul Loebach, Daniel Rybakken, Oki Sato, and Nika Zupanc, and others whose work was first exhibited at SaloneSatellite. The artist and designer Ini Archibong has said, "I owe a great deal to Marva and Satellite, and I consider myself blessed to have come in contact with such a powerful design gatekeeper." Paola Antonelli of the Department of Architecture & Design at Museum of Modern Art (MoMA) once called her the “great godmother of design.” Griffin is quoted as saying, "My objective is to help young people grow."

== Awards and honours ==
Griffin is a member of the Architecture and Design Committee at MoMA, she has served on juries for various scholarships and design awards such as the SaloneSatellite Award, the iF design Awards, and the Hublot Design Prize, and as a member of the World Design Organisation selection committee.

In 2014 she was awarded the Compasso d’Oro for career achievement; in 2015 she was nominated Women Ambassador for the Esposizione Universale in Milan; in 2016 she was made Ambassador of Italian Design by the Italian Ministry of Foreign Affairs and International Cooperation, Ministry of Cultural Heritage and Activities and Tourism, and the Ministry of Economic Development in collaboration with the Triennale Design Museum for the Italian Design Day conference; in 2017 she received the Ambrogino d'oro Gold Medal from the city of Milan; in 2017, she received Special Jury Prize from the Salone del Mobile; in 2021 she was awarded a laurea honoris causa from Milan Polytechnic University; and in 2024 she received an honorary doctorate from the Rhode Island School of Design.
