= Nika Zupanc =

Slovenian industrial designer

- Born: 17 March 1974 (age 52); Ljubljana
- Occupation: Designer
- Notable work: Nika Zupanc: Breaking the Rules
- Website: nikazupanc.com

Nika Zupanc (born 1974) is a Slovenian industrial designer. She is active in the fields of furniture, product, and interior design.

== Biography ==
Nika Zupanc was born in Ljubljana, Slovenia. She graduated from the Ljubljana Academy of Fine Arts and Design in 2000, and shortly thereafter her work was exhibited by Marva Griffin at SaloneSatellite at the Milan Furniture Fair.

In 2008, she established her own studio and works with same day to this day. Her designs are part of design companies such as Alessi, Moooi, Qeeboo, Dior, Driade and Natuzzi.

In November 2013, Zupanc presented a wooden structure, a pavillion, A room of one‘s own as part of an exhibition Esprit Dior : Miss Dior in Galerie Courbe – Grand palais in Paris and created a Collection III. for luxury London based company Sé. The collection was awarded with Editors award for best furniture at ICFF in New York.

Her Longing cabinet for Italian company Decastelli was part of Tracing identity project, that was awarded with Salone Del Mobile award 2017 and her Crystal lamp, designed for Contadi was awarded as best German design award in 2018. In 2020 she designed an extensive collection of furniture for Natuzzi Italia and she received 2020 Archiproduct design award for best furniture design for Wave sofa, that is a central object to the collection. In 2023 she also received an Archiproduct design award for Vento armchair, designed for Ditre Italia and NYCxDesign award for Knitty armchair for Moooi.

She also collaborated with Porsche for a art wrap of 911 4 GTS in 2022.

She was awarded with Big SEE Award, Design City, Ljubljana for STAY DAYBED by Nika Zupanc for Sé, Big SEE Award, Design City, Ljubljana for 88 SECRETS by Nika Zupanc for Scarlet Splendour and Big SEE Award, Design City, Ljubljana for LONGING CABINET by Nika Zupanc for De Castelli in 2019.

== Personal life ==
She lives and works in London.

== Publications ==
- Toromanoff, Agata; Dardi, Domitilla (2022). Nika Zupanc: Breaking the Rules. New York: Rizzoli. p. 240. ISBN 978-88-918337-7-8.
