= Gabriele Giolito de' Ferrari =

Italian printer

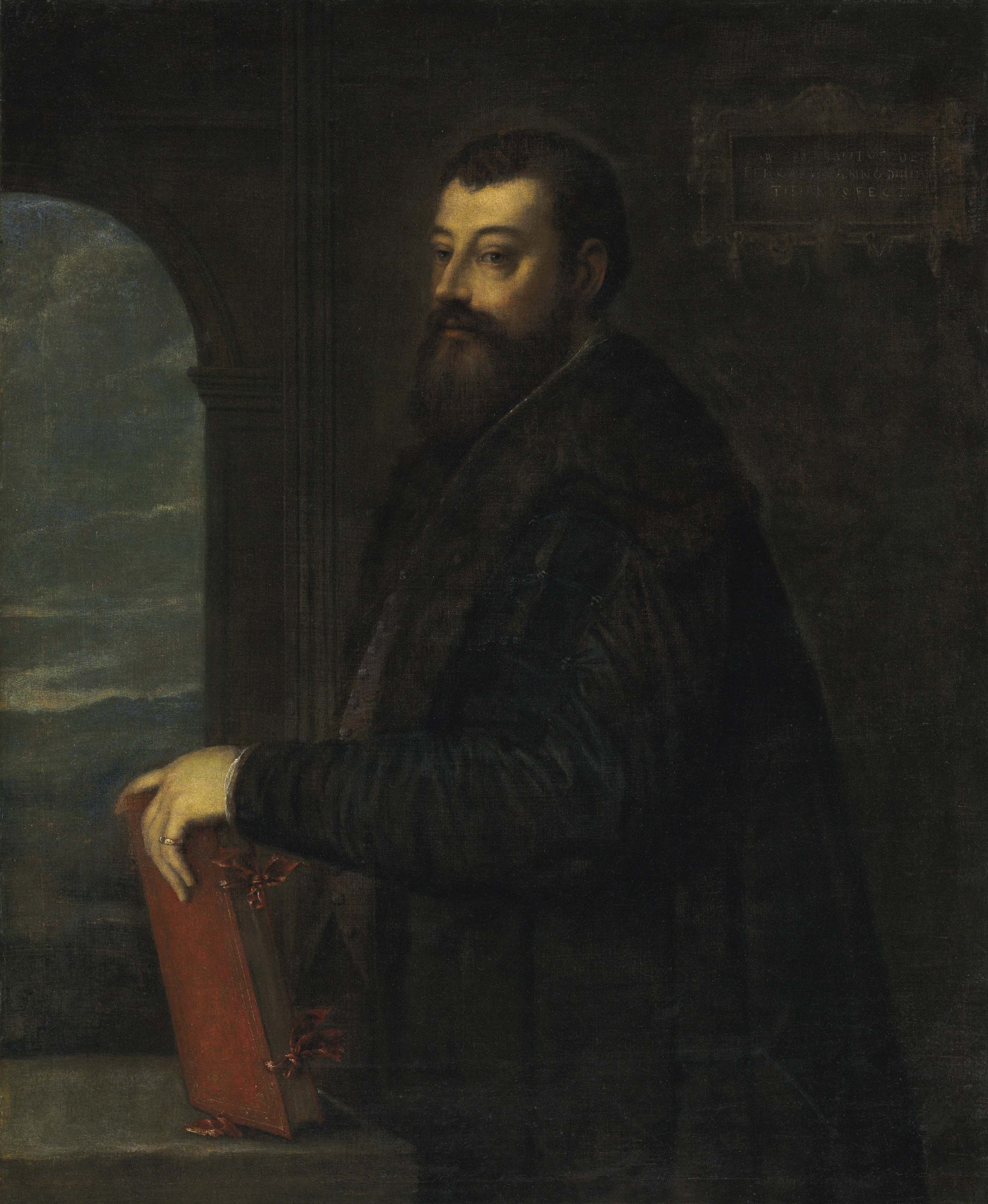
Gabriele Giolito de' Ferrari (Titian, 1554)

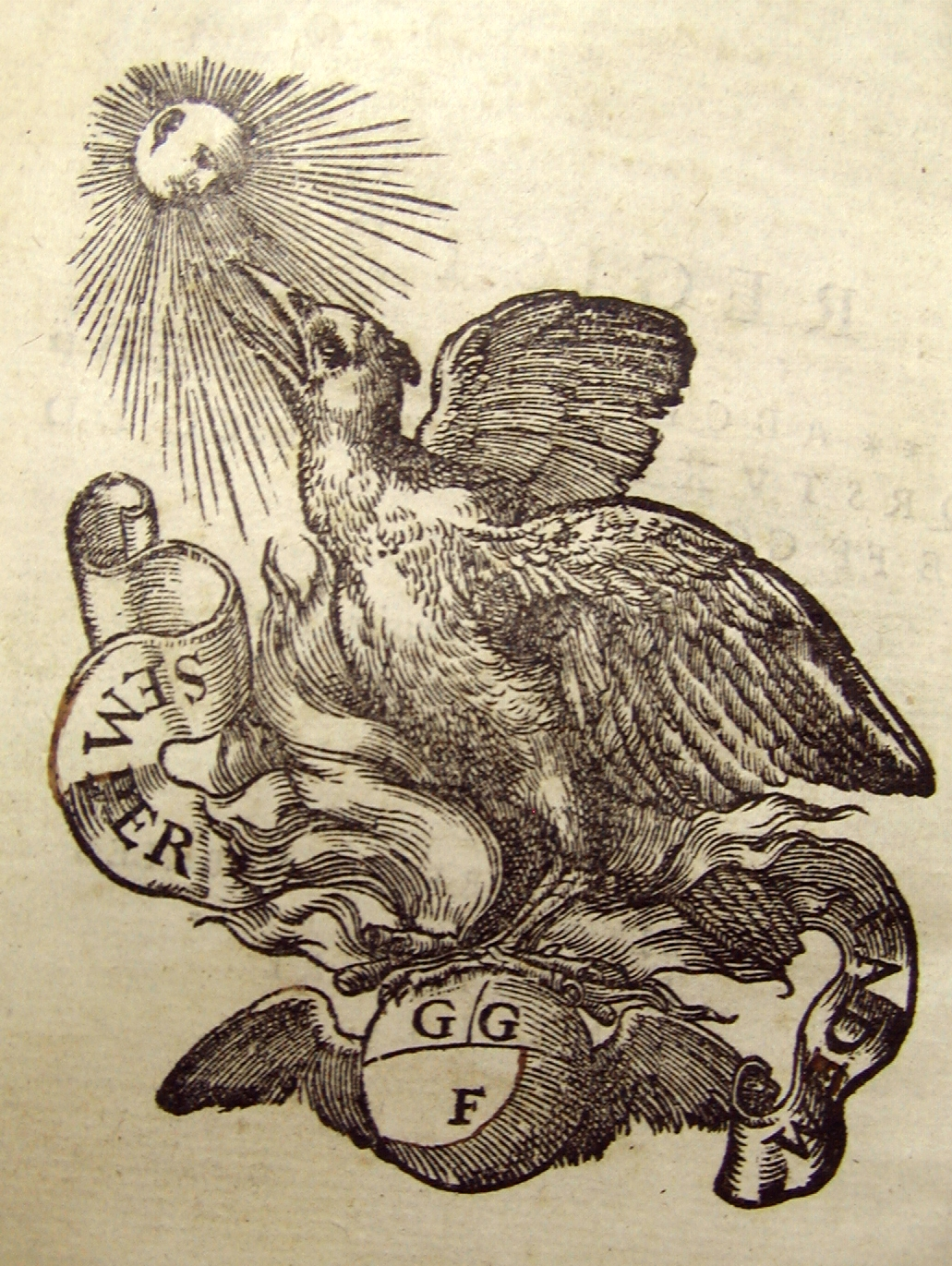
Printer's mark of Gabriele Giolito de' Ferrari ("GGF"), 1552, with Phoenix rising from the flames and motto "Semper eadem" (Latin: "Always the same")

Gabriele Giolito de' Ferrari (c. 1508 – 1578) was a 16th-century Italian printer active in Venice. He was one of the first major publishers of literature in the vernacular Italian language.

== Early life and career ==
Giolito was born at Trino to Giovanni the Elder and Guglielmina Borgominieri. In 1523 he established the Libreria della Fenice (Bookshop of the Phoenix), a printing press and bookstore, with his father in the Rialto district of Venice, at the time a major European center of the new art of printing. When his father moved to Turin, Gabriele operated the press initially with his brothers and then with increasing autonomy, acquiring shops in Naples, Bologna, and Ferrara.

He married Lucrezia Bin in 1544 and with her had twelve children.

== Publications ==
Giolito's press published a mix of Renaissance classics and new authors. Giolito was dedicated to publishing works in the lingua volgare, or Italian vernacular, as opposed to Latin, Greek and other languages not familiar to the common population. Beginning in 1545, his printing house issued the influential collections of lyric poetry entitled 'Rime Diverse' and known today as the 'Giolito Anthologies.' Eight anthologies would follow, not all of them published by Giolito. The poems in these anthologies, especially the first two, would serve as influential models to the French poet Joachim du Bellay. He was also famous for his 1555 edition of Dante Alighieri's Commedia, edited by Lodovico Dolce and for the first time published with the title Divina Commedia. Giolito was also well known for his printer's mark, which had many variations but was most often represented by a phoenix emerging from flames atop a globe with the initials G.G.F.

Giolito de Ferrari's printer marks

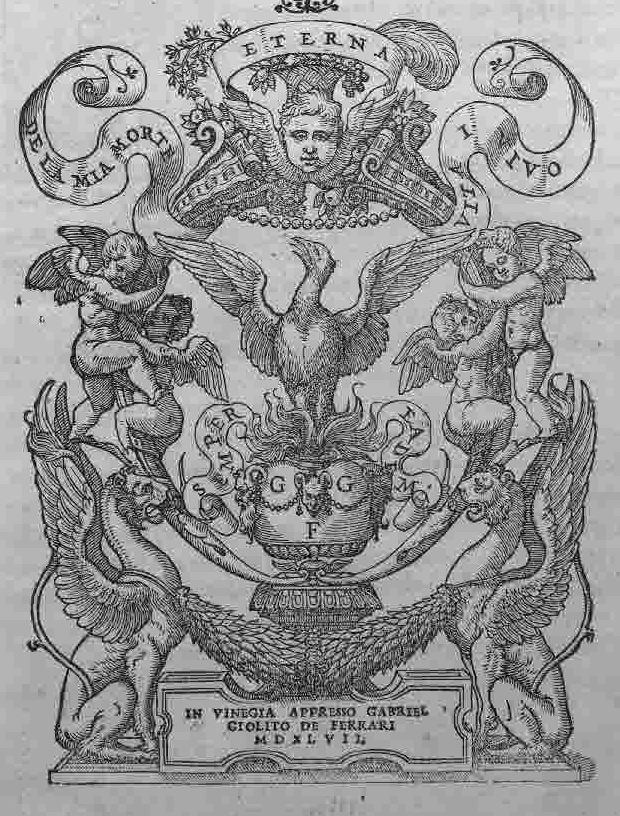

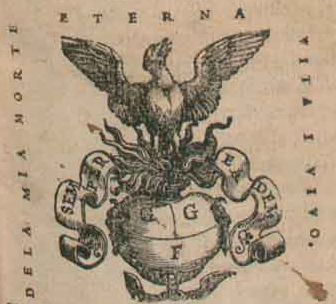

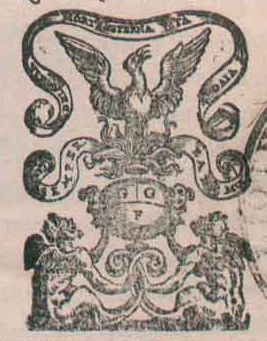

== Death ==
Gabriele Giolito de' Ferrari died in Venice in 1578. The press was taken over by his sons, Giovanni the Younger and Giovanni Paolo, who continued to publish until 1606.

== See also ==
- Books in Italy
