= Arabic miniature =

Small paintings on paper

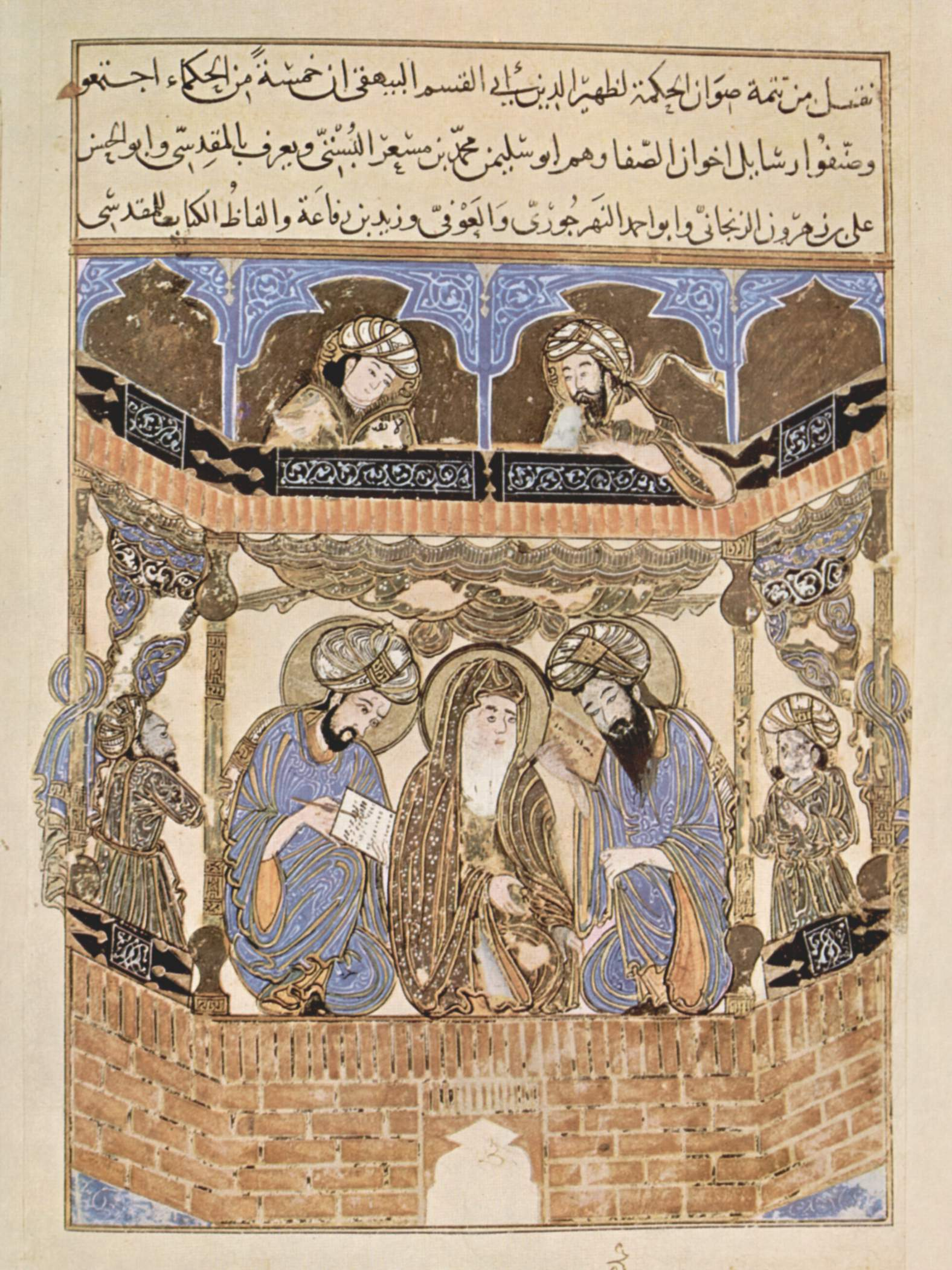
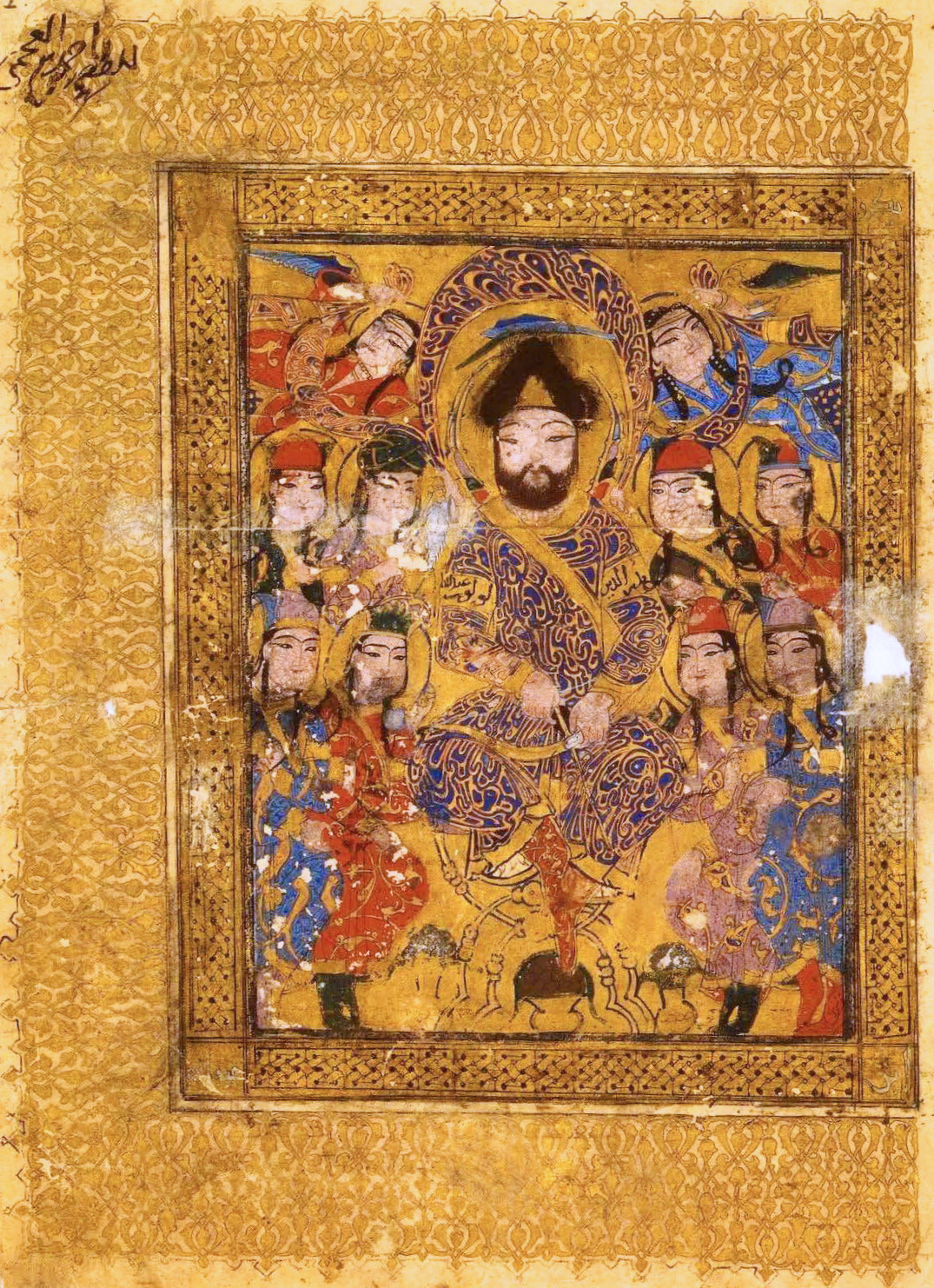
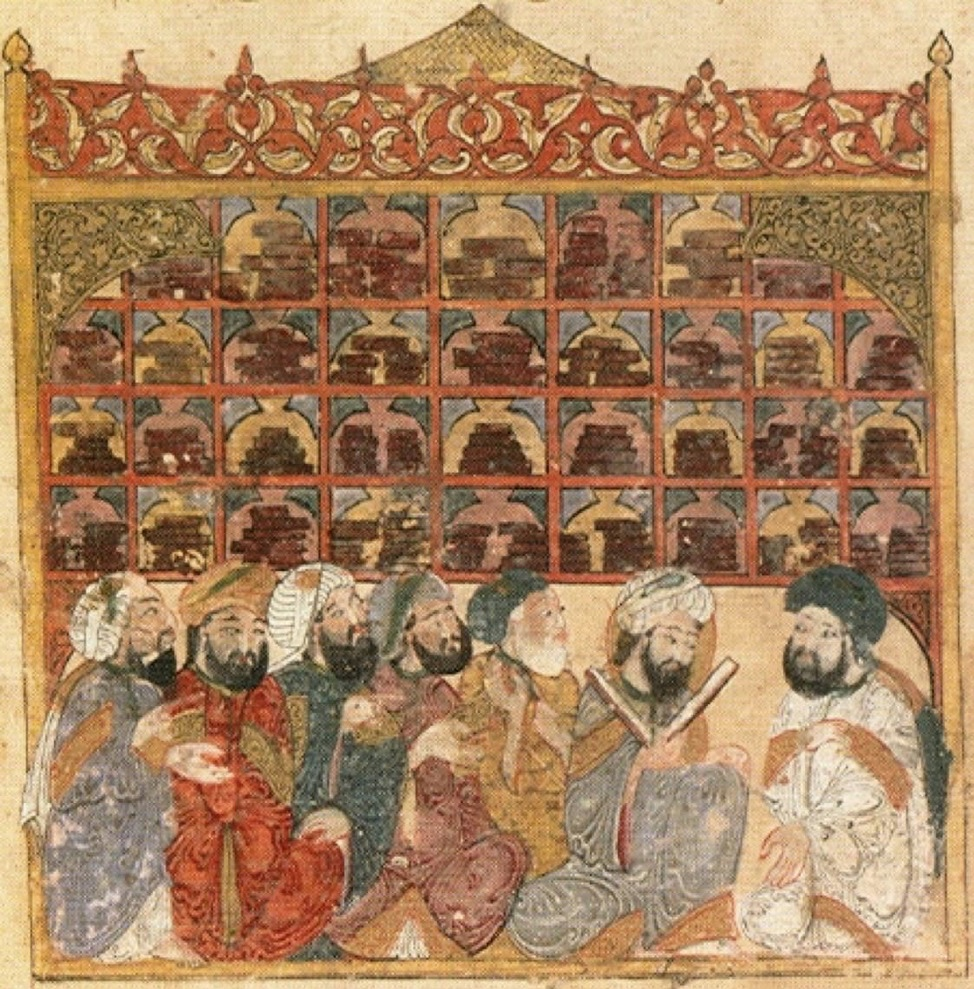
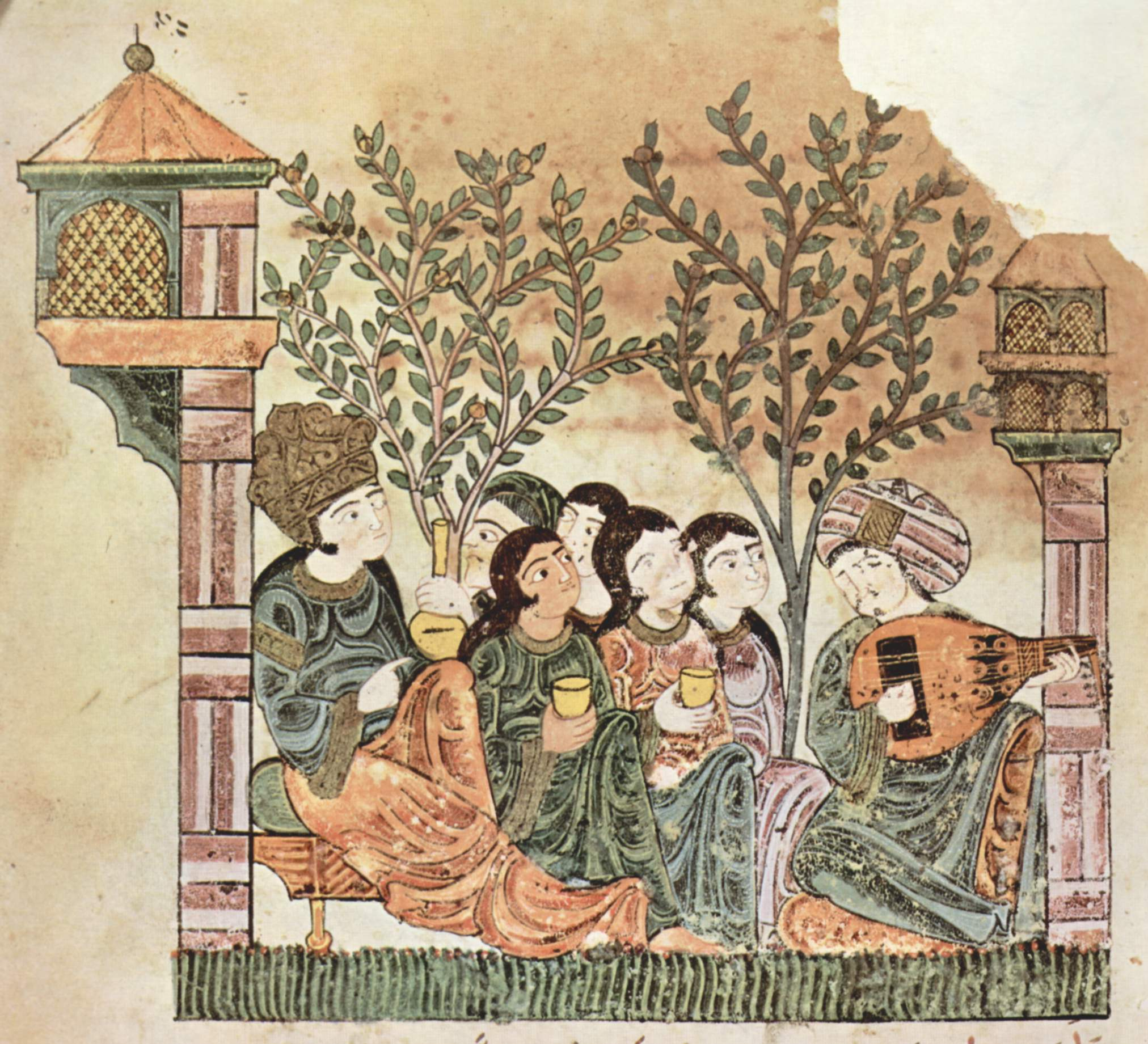
Various examples of pages from Arabic illuminated manuscripts.

Arabic miniatures (Arabic: ٱلْمُنَمْنَمَات ٱلْعَرَبِيَّة, Al-Munamnamāt al-ʿArabīyyah) are small paintings on paper, usually book or manuscript illustrations but also sometimes separate artworks that occupy entire pages. The earliest example dates from around 690 AD, with a flourishing of the art from between 1000 and 1200 AD in the Abbasid caliphate. The art form went through several stages of evolution while witnessing the fall and rise of several Islamic caliphates. Arab miniaturists absorbed Chinese and Persian influences brought by the Mongol destructions, and at last, got totally assimilated and subsequently disappeared due to the Ottoman occupation of the Arab world. Nearly all forms of Islamic miniatures (Persian miniatures, Ottoman miniatures and Mughal miniatures) owe their existences to Arabic miniatures, as Arab patrons were the first to demand the production of illuminated manuscripts in the Caliphate, it wasn't until the 14th century that the artistic skill reached the non-Arab regions of the Caliphate.

Despite the considerable changes in Arabic miniature style and technique, even during their last decades, the early Umayyad Arab influence could still be noticed. Arabic miniature artists include Ismail al-Jazari, who illustrated his own Book of Knowledge of Ingenious Mechanical Devices, and the Abbasid artist, Yahya Al-Wasiti, who probably lived in Baghdad in the late Abbasid era (12th to 13th-centuries), was one of the pre-eminent exponents of the Baghdad school. In 1236-1237, he is known to have transcribed and illustrated the book, Maqamat (also known as the Assemblies or the Sessions), a series of anecdotes of social satire written by Al-Hariri of Basra. The narrative concerns the travels of a middle-aged man as he uses his charm and eloquence to swindle his way across the Arabic world.

With most surviving Arabic manuscripts in western museums, Arabic miniatures occupy very little space in modern Arab culture.

== Origins ==
=== Non-figurative ornaments in early Mus'hafs ===
The following manuscripts are listed in a chronological order, however the date estimates of a codex may be concurrent or similar to those of other manuscripts due to the wide range of date estimates offered by radiocarbon dating:

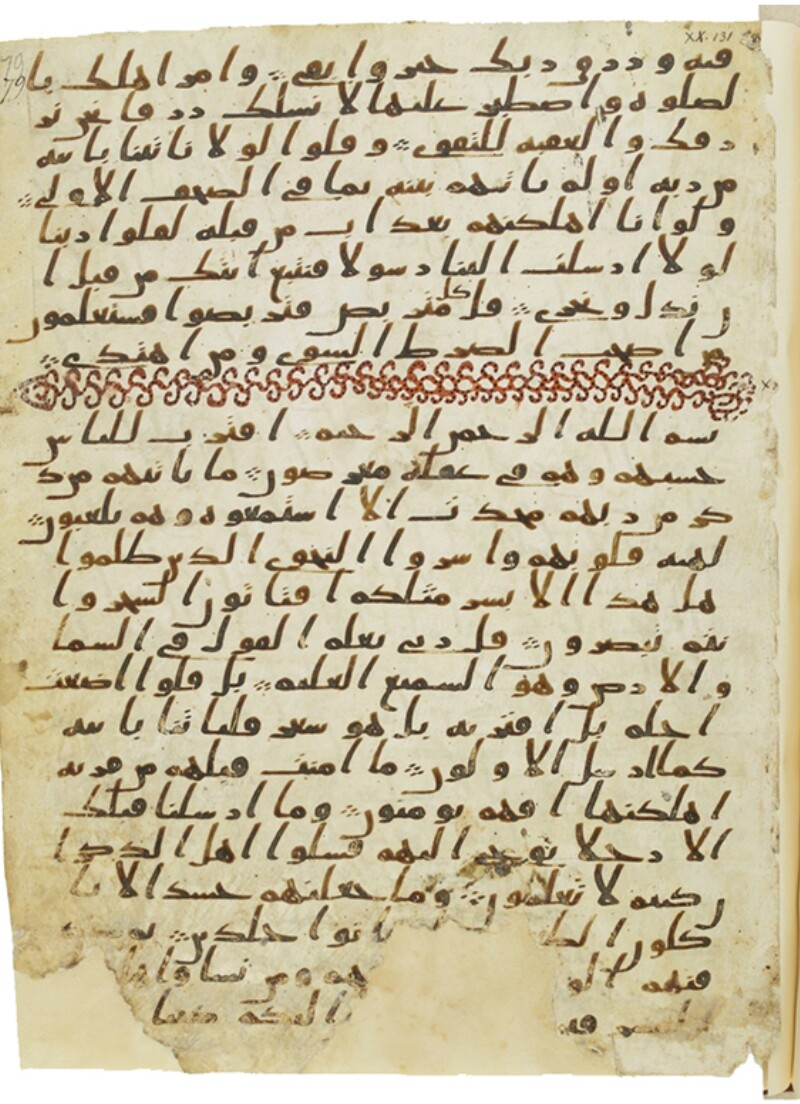
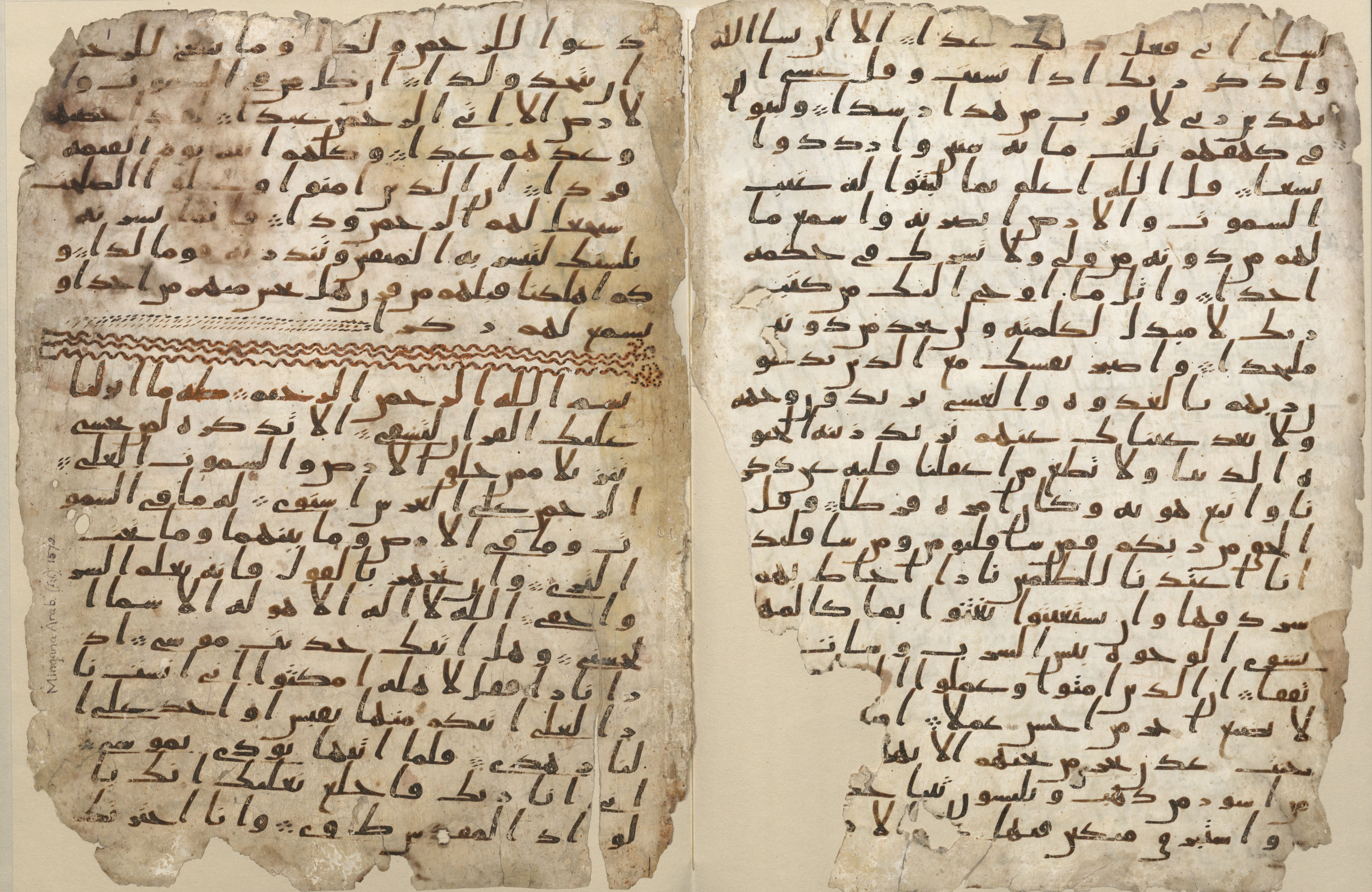
Pages from the Birmingham Quran manuscript.

The Birmingham Quran manuscript is a parchment on which two leaves of an early Quranic manuscript are written. In 2015 the manuscript, which is held by the University of Birmingham, was radiocarbon dated to between 568 and 645 CE (in the Islamic calendar, between 56 BH and 25 AH). It is part of the Mingana Collection of Middle Eastern manuscripts, held by the university's Cadbury Research Library. The manuscript is written in ink on parchment, using an Arabic Hijazi script and is still clearly legible. The leaves preserve parts of Surahs 18 (Al-Kahf) to 20 (Taha). It was on display at the University of Birmingham in 2015 and then at Birmingham Museum and Art Gallery until 5 August 2016. The Cadbury Research Library has carried out multispectral analysis of the manuscript and XRF analysis of the inks.

There are no diacritical marks to indicate short vowels, but consonants are occasionally differentiated with oblique dashes. The text is laid out in the format that was to become standard for complete Quran manuscripts, with chapter divisions indicated by a decorated line in the form of basic geometric shapes painted with red lead, an ancient pigment used from 300 BCE onwards, such motifs vary in color and shapes in this manuscript, in one folio, three wavy threads of orange-red colour separated by dots run parallel over the entire span of the page, In the outer margin, the three lines are interlaced to draw a highly stylized palm leaf, in another folio, the separator is covered with blackheads. The verse endings are indicated by intertextual clustered dots.

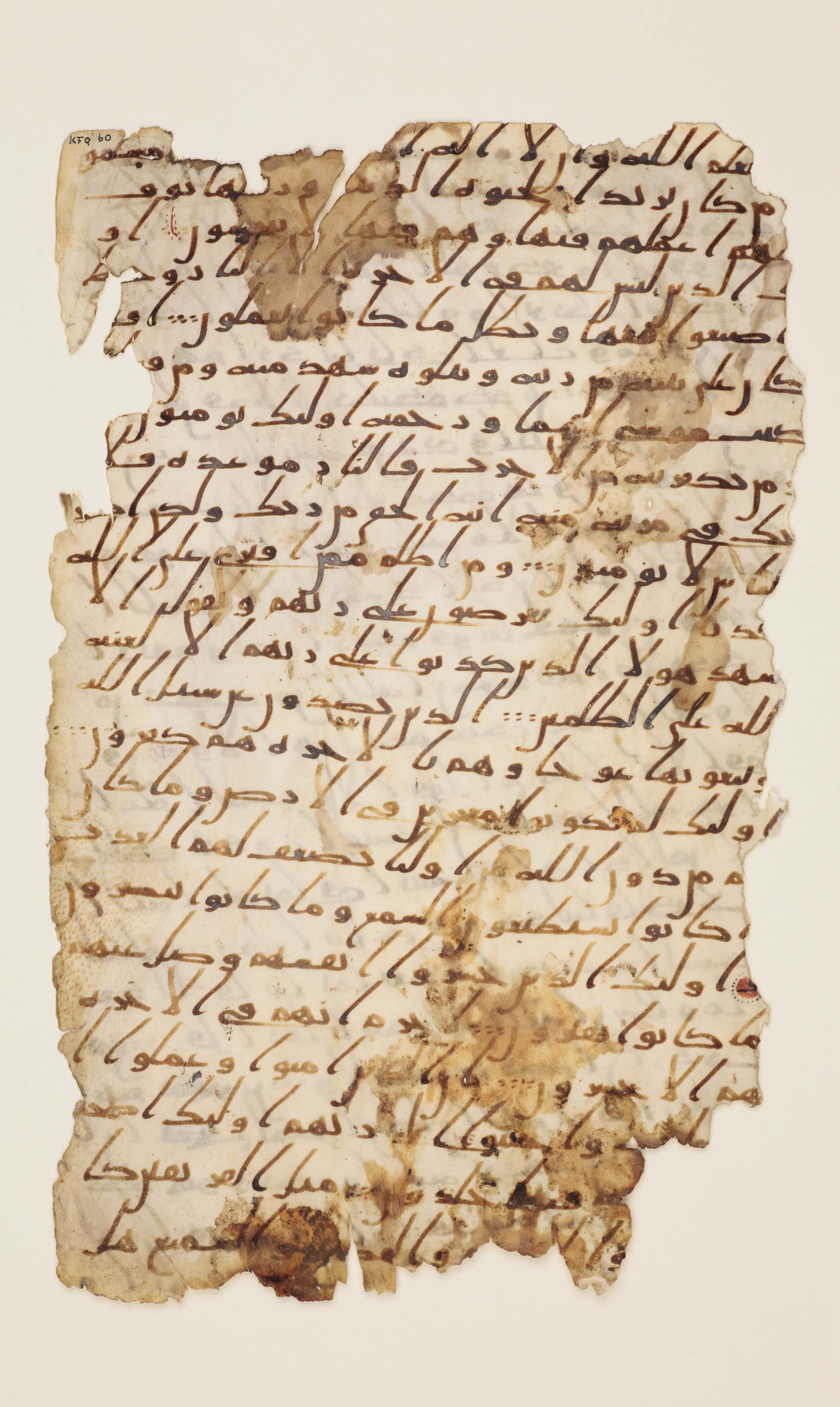
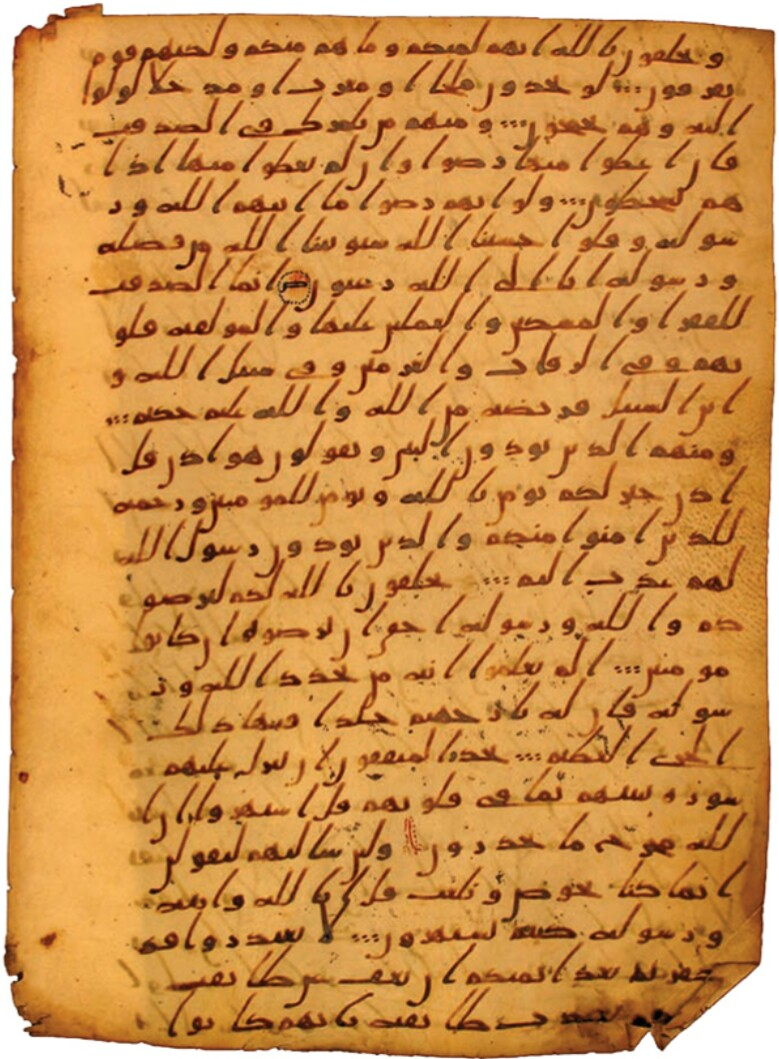
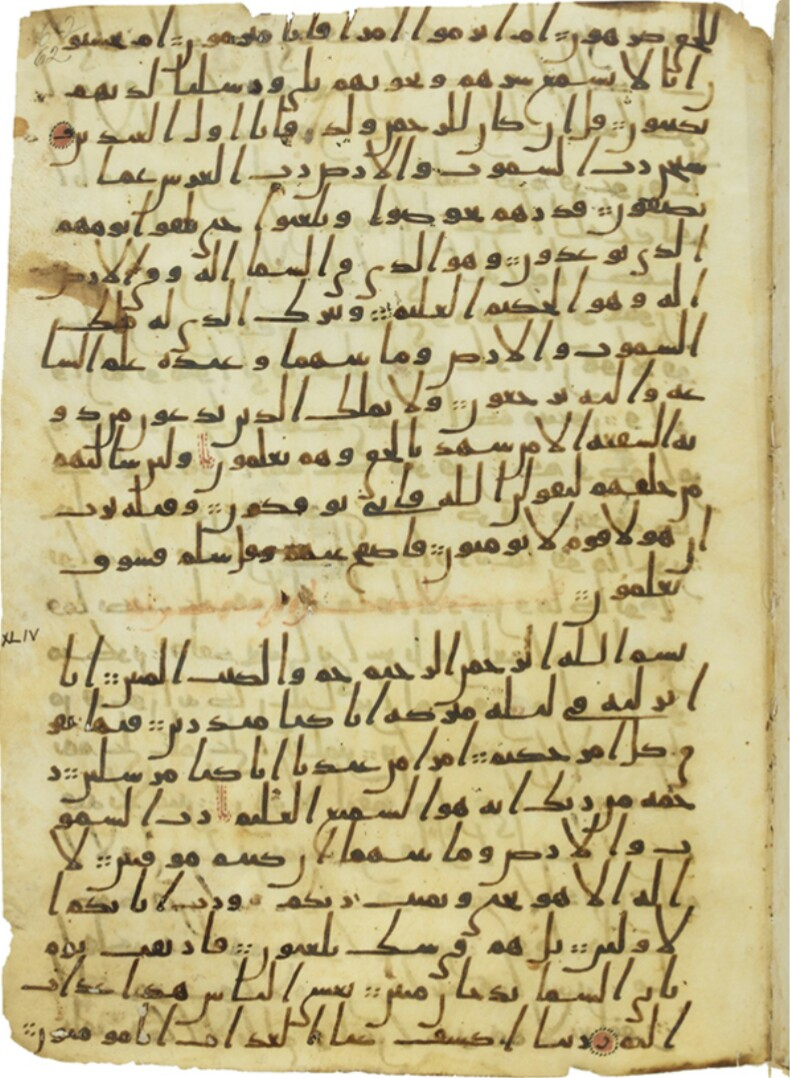
Folios from the Codex Parisino-Petropolitanus.

In the codex Parisino-petropolitanus, one of the oldest extant manuscripts of the Quran. With its largest part of the fragmentary manuscript being held at the Bibliothèque nationale de France, Paris, as BnF Arabe 328(ab), with 70 folia. And another 46 folia are kept in the National Library of Russia in Saint-Petersburg.

Two additional folia have been preserved, one kept in the Vatican Library (Vat. Ar. 1605/1) and the other in the Khalili Collections in London (KFQ 60), attributed to the 7th century, six oval dots ranked in three pairs also punctuate the verses. Every fifth verse is marked by a red alif surrounded by dots (rather than hollow circles like in Codex B. L. Or. 2165). The surahs are separated by a space.

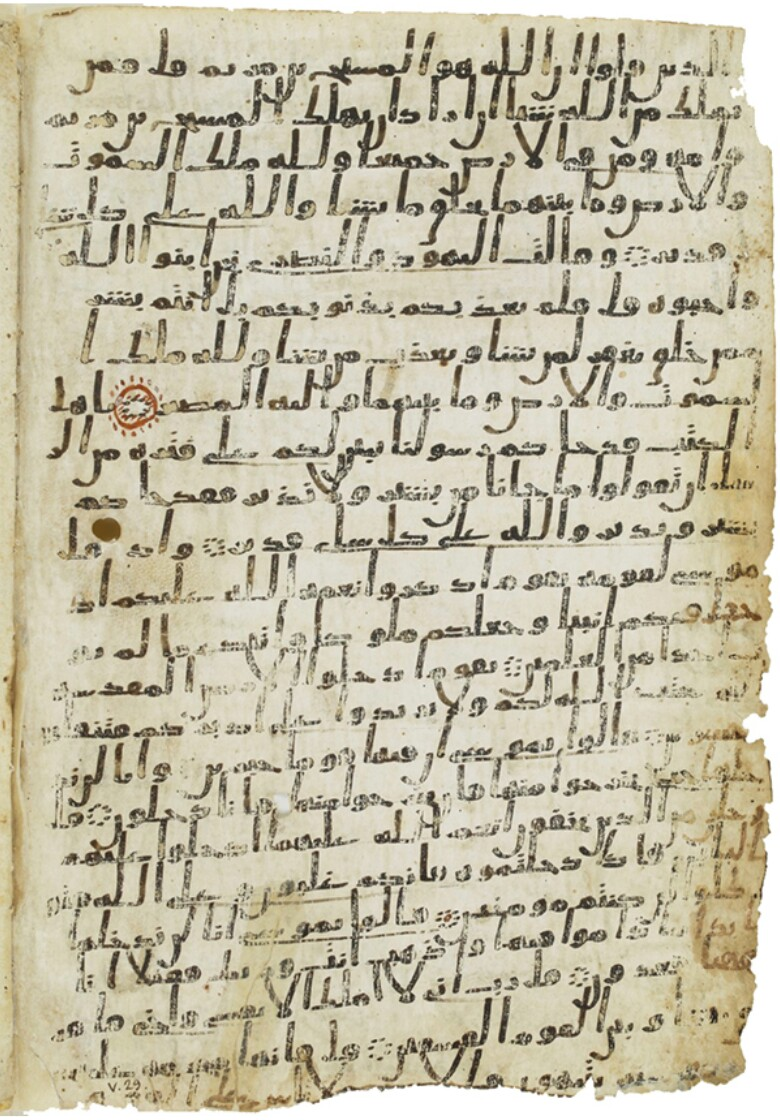
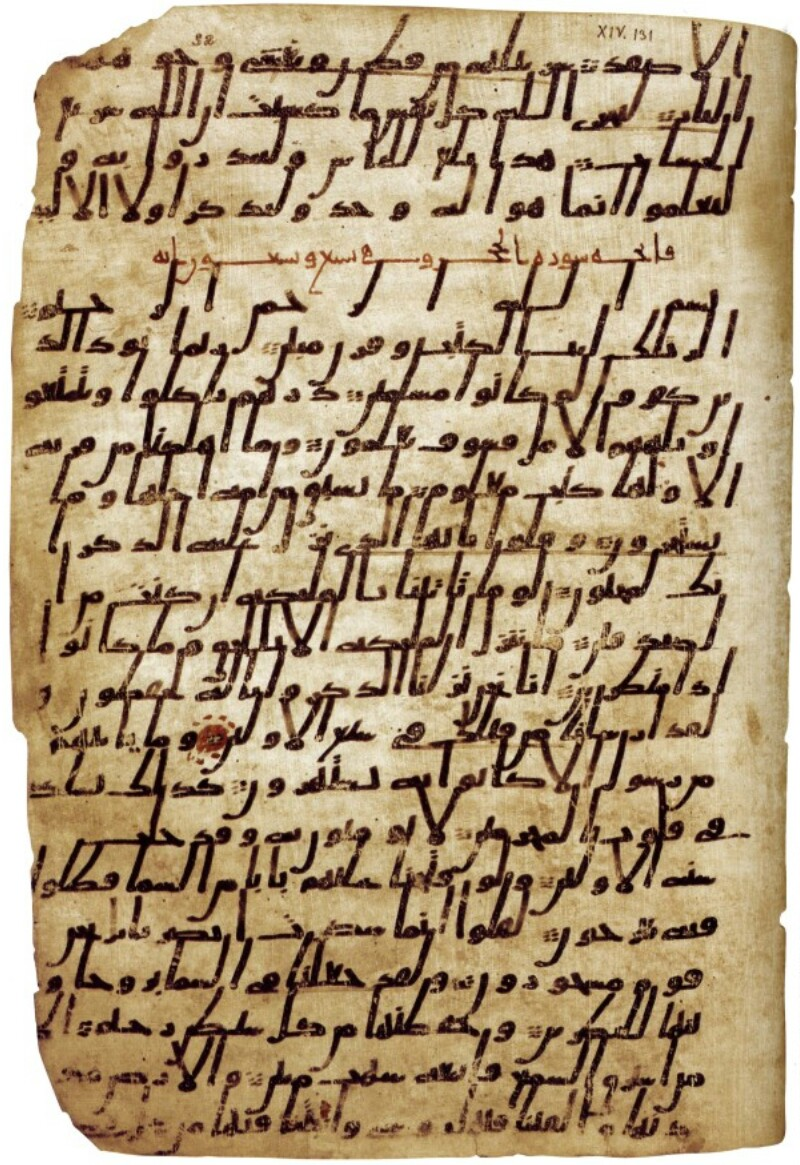
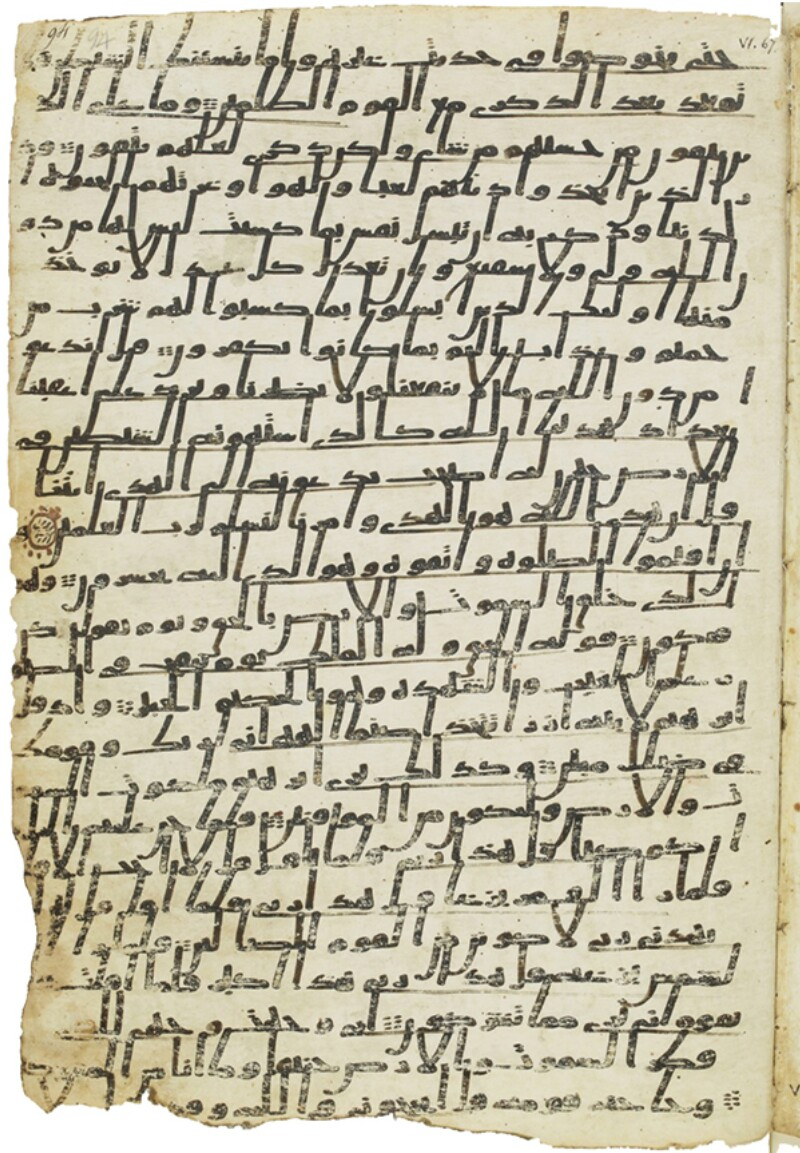
Folios from the Codex B. L. Or. 2165.

In the Codex B. L. Or. 2165, a Qur'ānic manuscript from the 1st century Hijra, with its fragments in the British Library, London (United Kingdom); Bibliothèque Nationale, Paris (France) and in Dār al–Athar al–Islāmiyyah, Kuwait city (Kuwait). Six oval dots ranked in three pairs punctuate the verses. Every tenth verse is marked by a red hollow circle surrounded by dots.

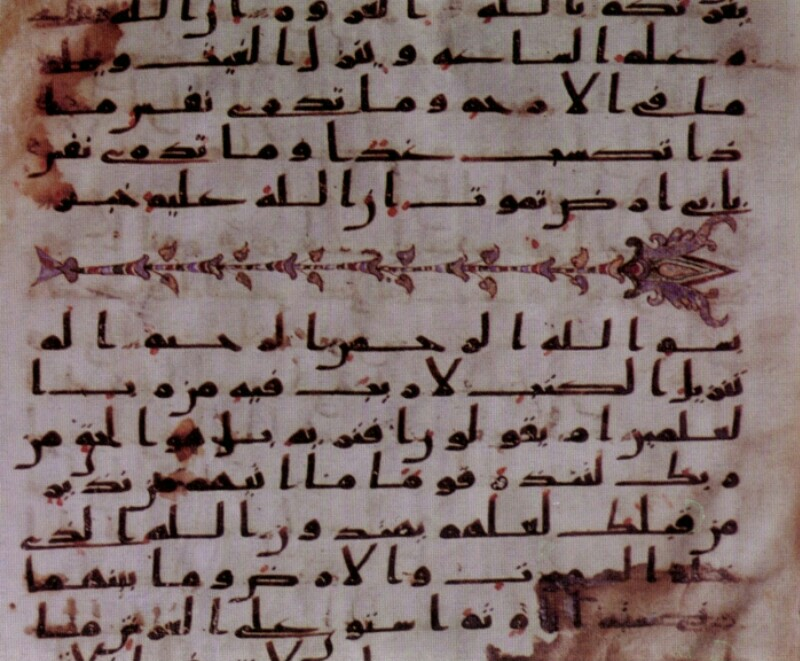
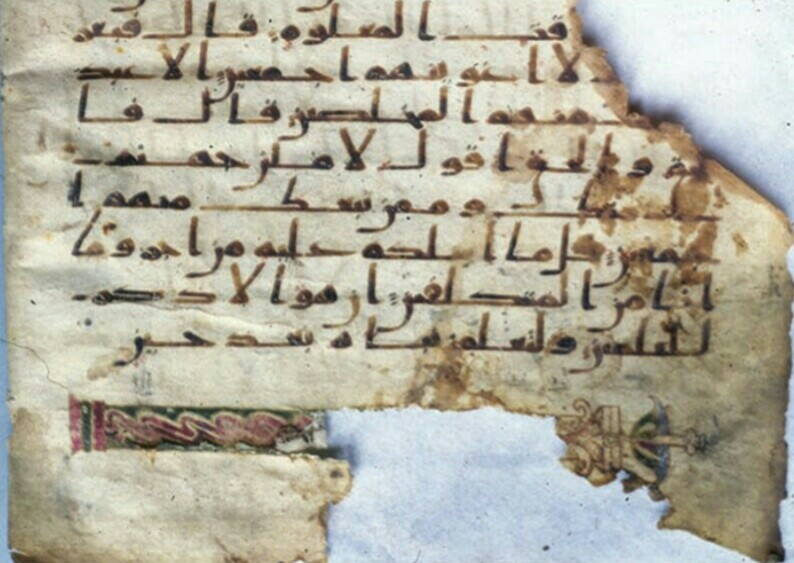
Folios from the codex TIEM ŞE 321 (the "Damascus Umayyad Qur'an"): Folio 33v and Folio 57v.

Simple ornaments of the borders and openings of the surahs in the pages of the 1st century hijra Qur'ans are also found. A notable example is the TIEM ŞE 321 Mus'haf (This manuscript belongs to the Şam Evrakı ‘Papers of Syria’ collection, at the Turkish and Islamic arts Museum). The surah headings of this codex are illuminated but do not represent the text found in the pages. The decorations of this Qur'an resembles those of the Umayyad mosaics of the Dome of the Rock in Jerusalem. It's dated to the period after 72 AH / 691–692 CE or more probably during the last quarter of the 1st (early 8th) century hijra.

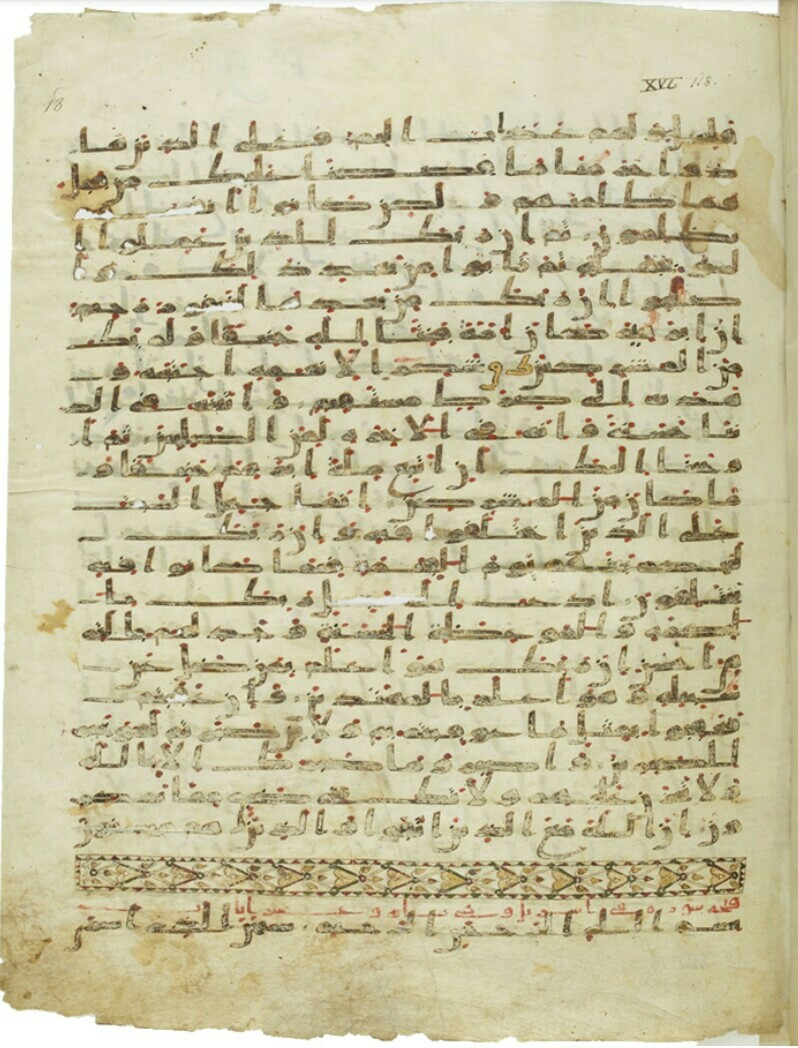
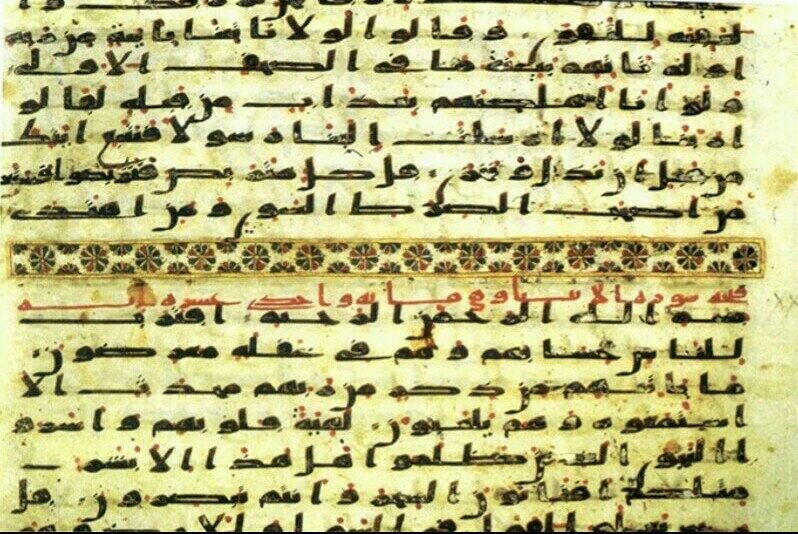
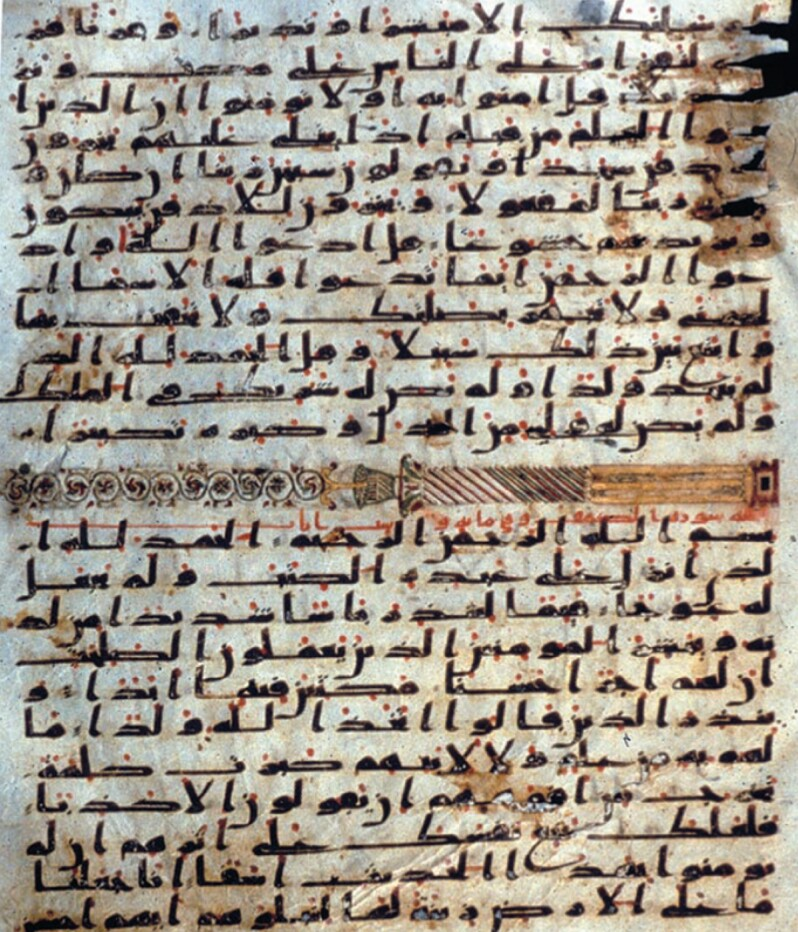
Folios from codex Marcel 13 (the "Umayyad Codex of Fusṭāṭ"): Arabe 330c, f. 18r, Marcel 13, f. 15r and Marcel 13, f. 3r.

The “Umayyad Codex of Fusṭāṭ” (Codex Marcel 13) of the 1st century of hijra, is a manuscript that may have been one of the mus'hafs that were sent by al-Hajjaj to many important cities including Fusṭāṭ that contained reformed orthography, it is written in the Kufic or perhaps late ḥijāzī script.

This copy was written with 25 lines to the page on folios in vertical format. The average height of the line is about 11.5 mm. With homogenous quires with five bifolios. The surah headings of this codex are illuminated but irregularly.

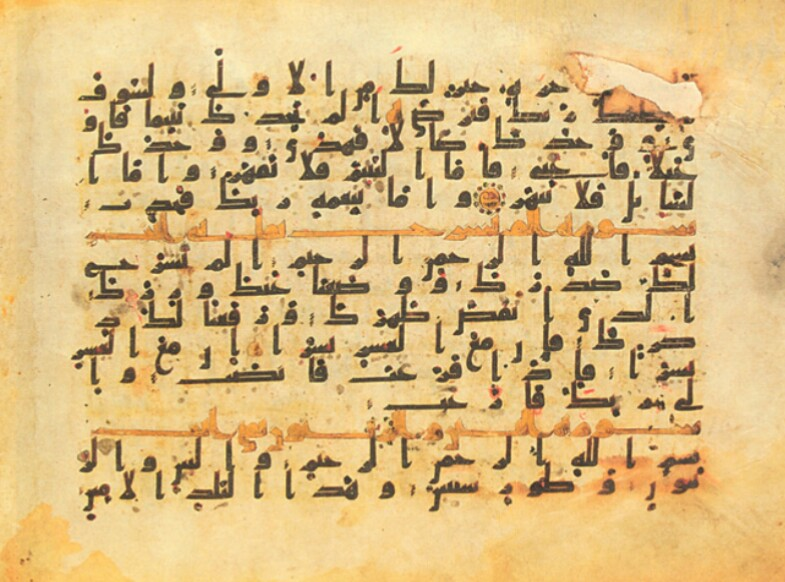
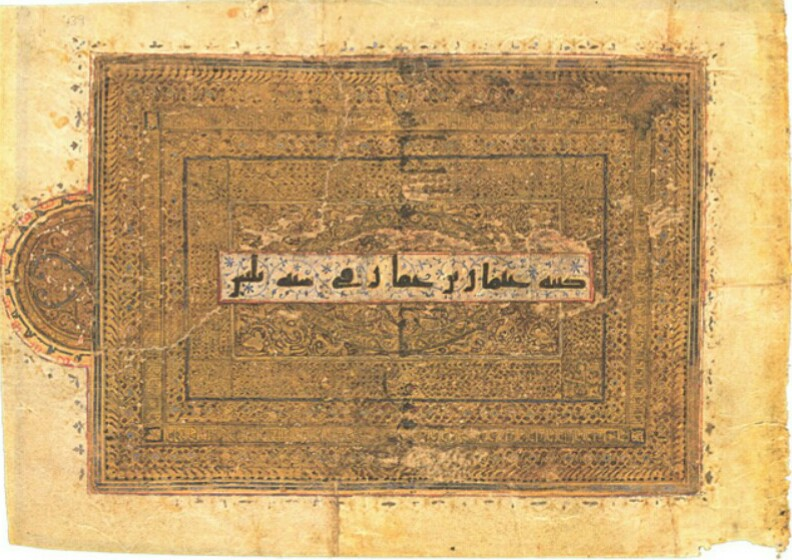
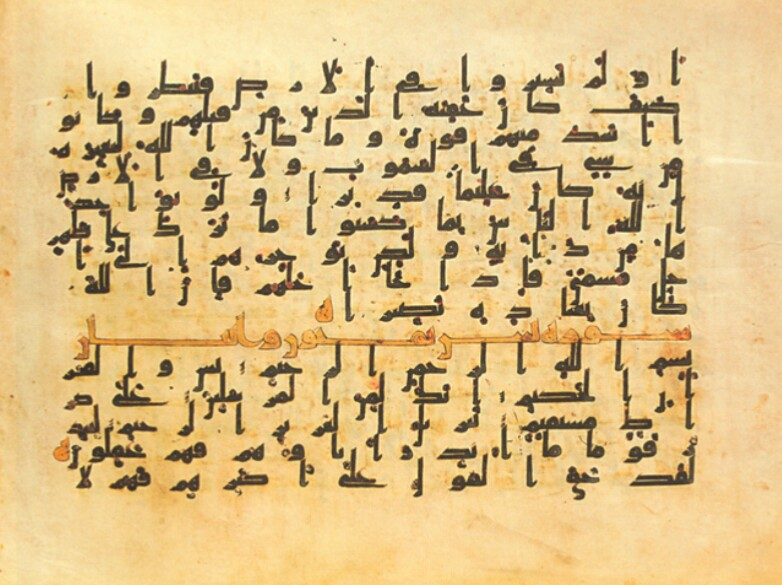
Pages from the “Qur'ān Of ʿUthmān” At The Turkish and Islamic Art Museum, Istanbul, Turkey, second image reads: کٮٮه عٮماں ٮں عڡاں ڡى سںه ٮلٮىں ("ʿUthmān bin ʿAffān wrote it in the year thirty [AH]").

Another manuscript housed in the Turkish and Islamic Arts Museum is the "Qur'an of 'Uthman", due to its colophon that attributes the scribal work of the mus'haf to 'Uthman bin' Affan, the third Rashidun caliph, however, the style of script and decorations seems to go against this claim. Therefore, it is more likely that this manuscript dates back to the second half of 1st century or first half of 2nd century hijra. The codex was restored by Dāwūd bin ʿAlī al-Kaylānī on 3 December 1437 CE.

The manuscript is written on parchment made out of gazelle skin. While the folios from the restoration of 1437 CE are made out of paper. Every tenth ayah is marked with a circular gold medallion surrounded by blue, green, and red dots.

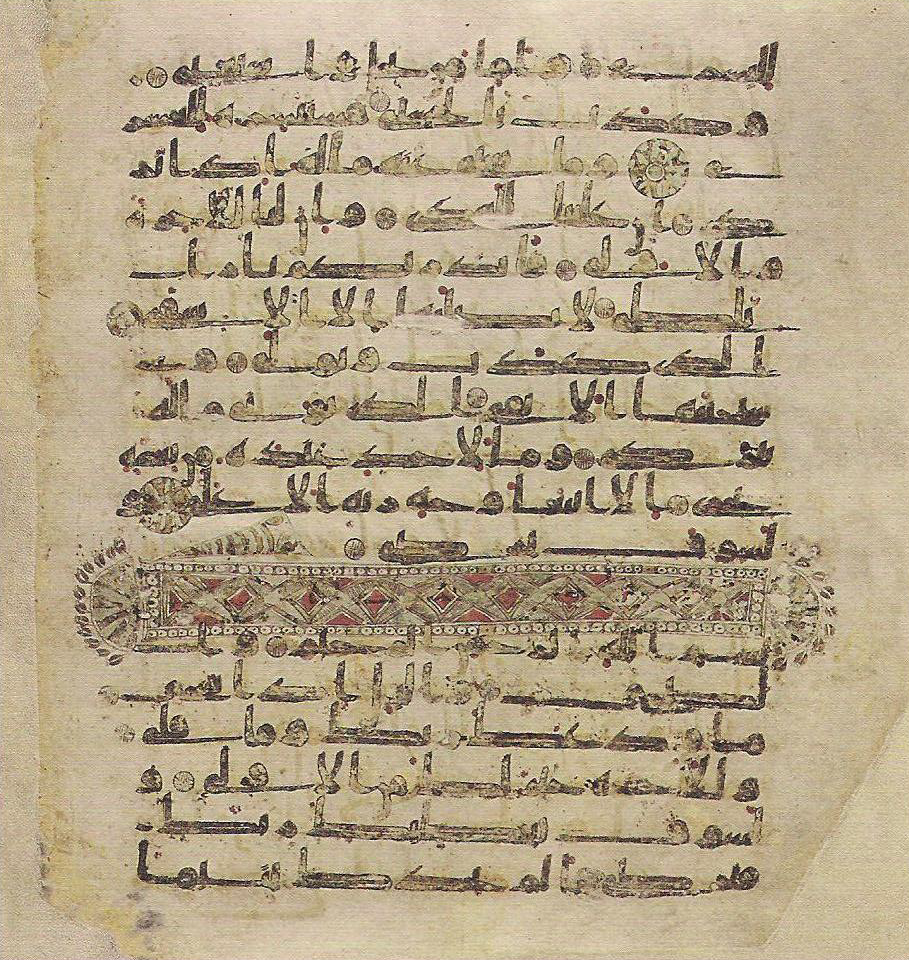
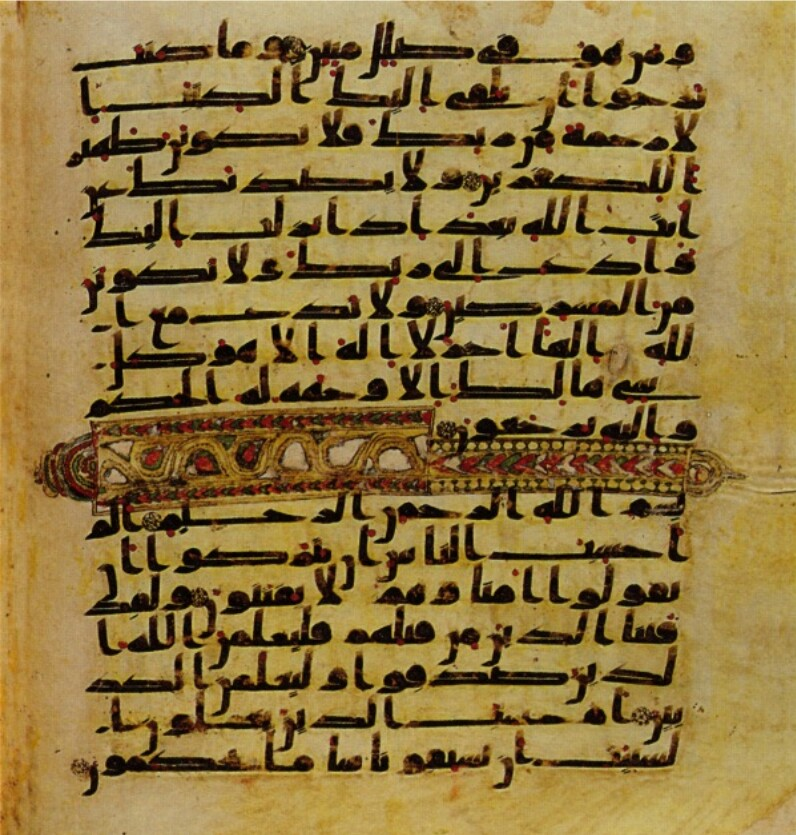
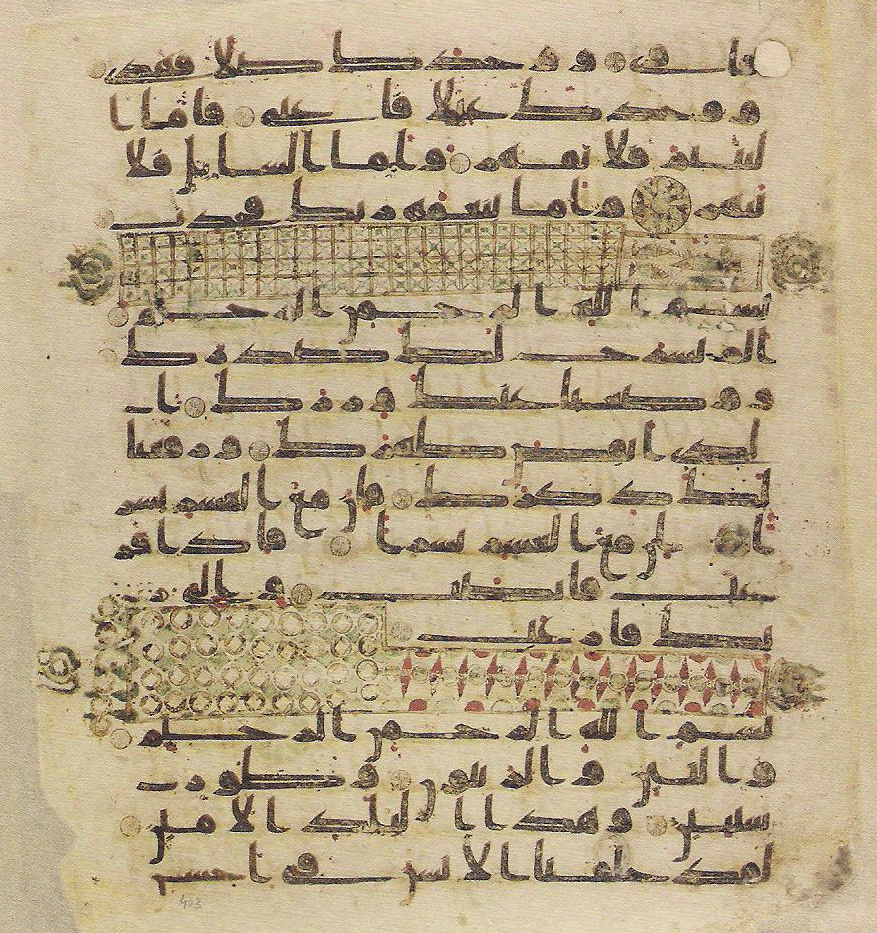
Pages from the Topkapi Mus'haf.

The Topkapı Mushaf, also called “Qur'ān Of ʿUthmān” (Topkapi Museum, Istanbul, Turkey), From 1st / 2nd Century Hijra, is traditionally attributed to Uthman Ibn Affan. But the paleographic assessment indicates that the Topkapi manuscript comes closest to those writings that date back to the 8th century. Its illuminations are similar to those found in the Dome of the Rock in Jerusalem, the Umayyad Mosque in Damascus and other Umayyad monuments.

Its surahs are separated by ornamented horizontal bands. The manuscript also contains large circular rosettes, these are found after every 5 and 10 Ayahs, while rectangular shaped signs are found after every 100 verses and signs of similar shape following every 200 verses in some surahs.

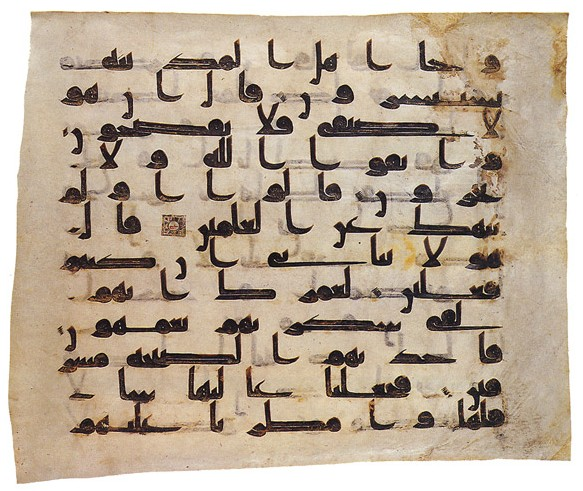
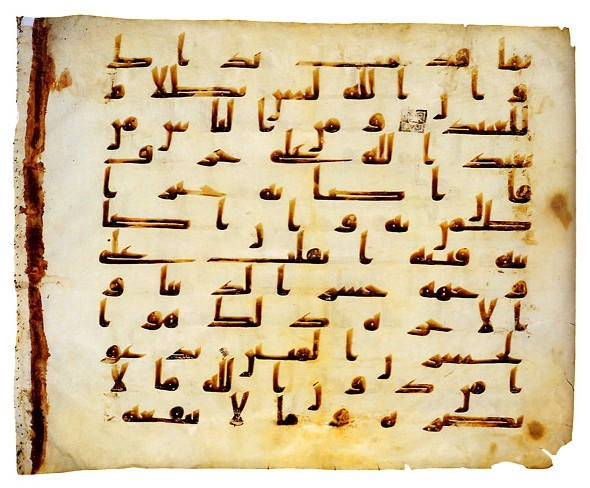
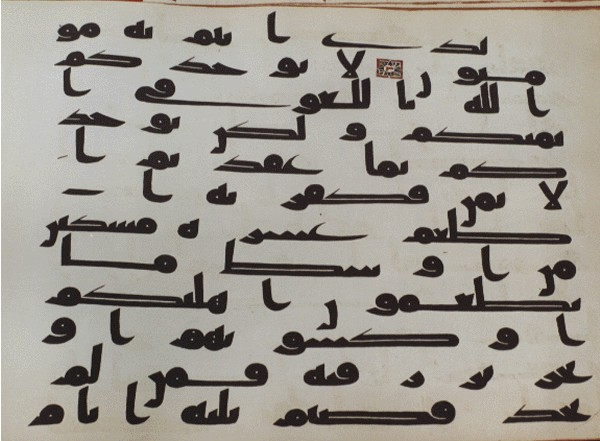
Pages from the Uthman Qur'an. (notice the square medallions)

As for the “Qur'ān Of ʿUthmān” (also known as the Uthman Quran, Samarkand codex, Samarkand manuscript and Tashkent Quran) at Tashkent (Samarkand), Uzbekistan, based on orthographic and palaeographic studies, it probably dates from the 8th or 9th century. Radio-carbon dating shows a 95.4% probability of a date between 775 and 995. However, one of the folios from another manuscript (held in the Religious Administration of Muslims in Tashkent) was dated to between 595 and 855 A.D. with a likelihood of 95%.

Written in the territory of modern Iraq in the Kufic script. Now kept in the Hast Imam library, in Tashkent, Uzbekistan. Its verse endings are marked by small panels of diagonals lines; the tenth verse is marked with a square medallion illuminated in blue, green, red and manganese with a stellar design.

=== Emergence of Arabic miniatures ===
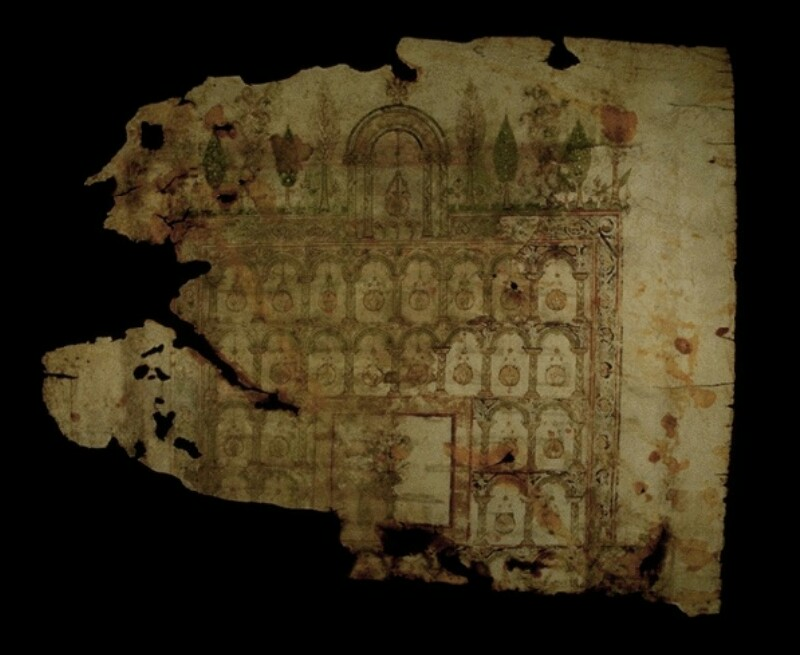
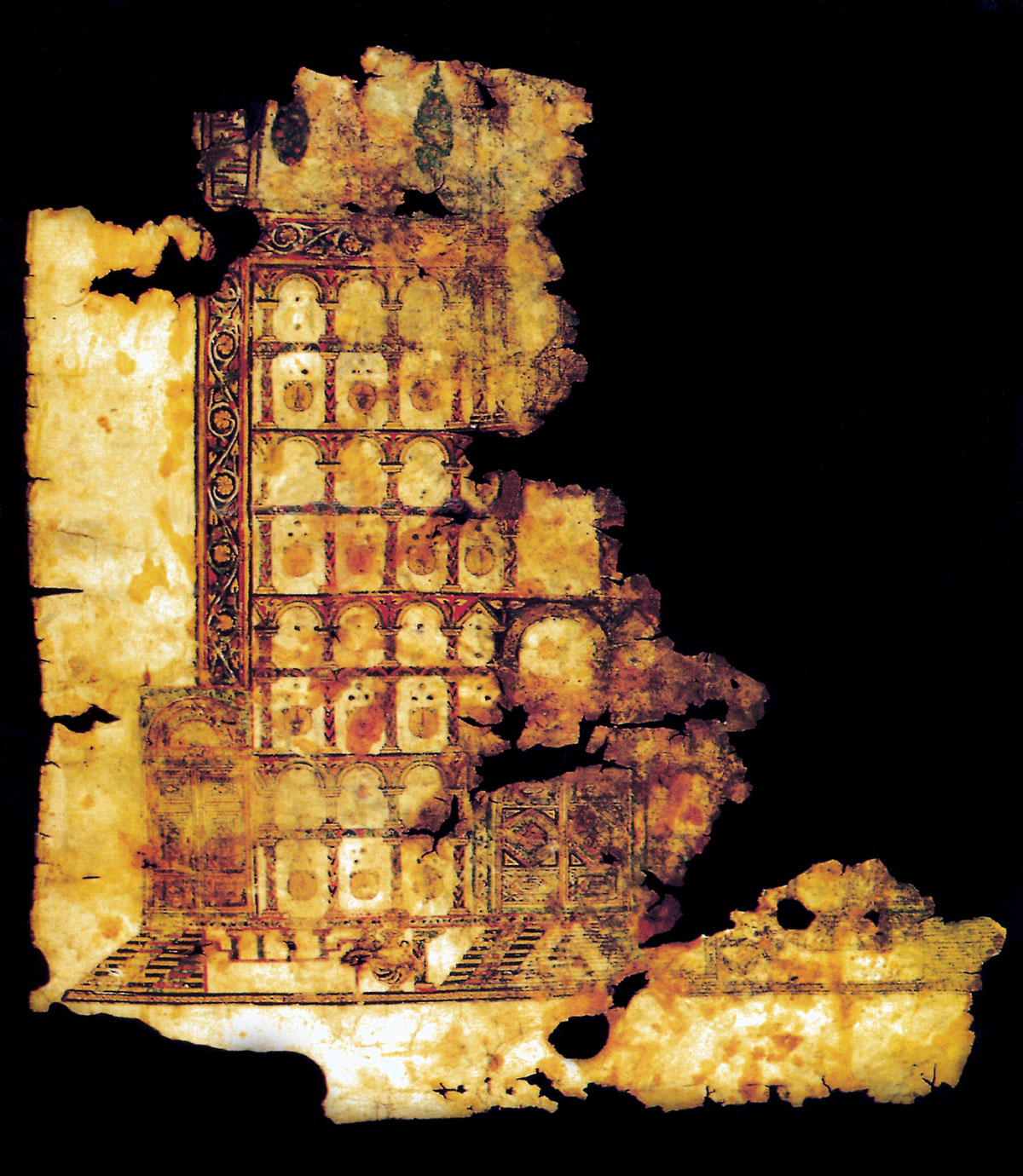
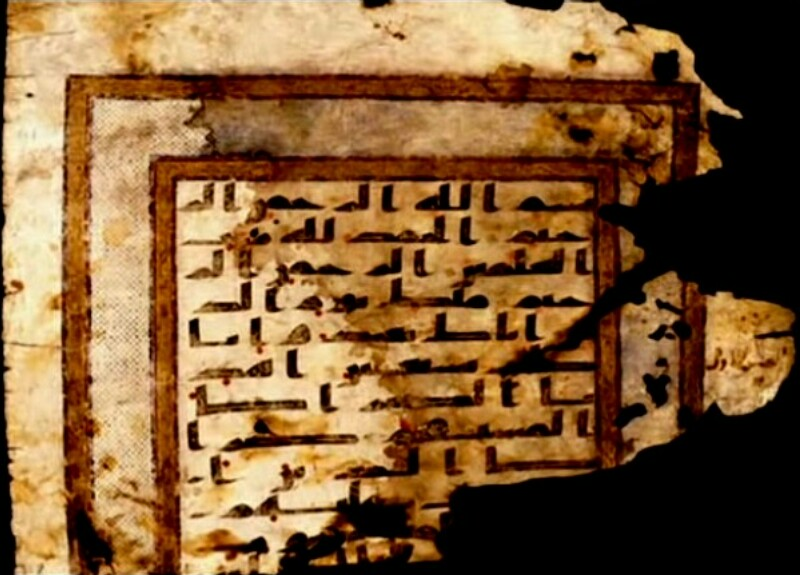
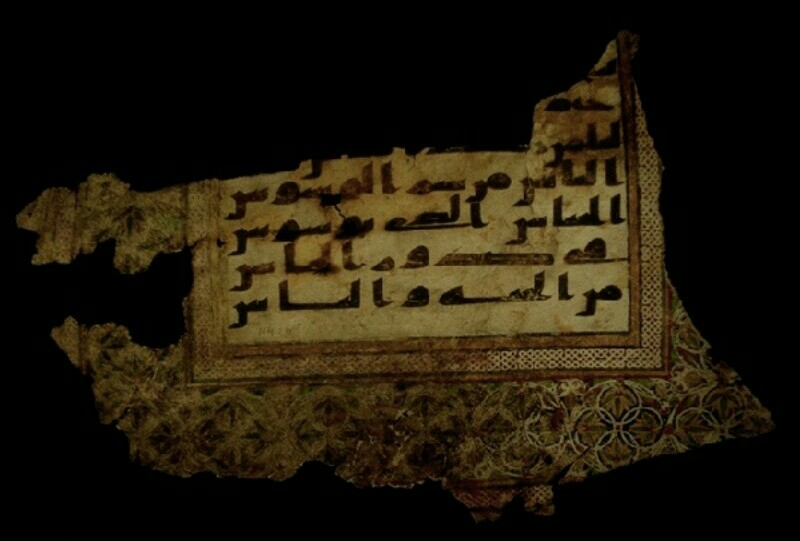
Double page display of two full pictures in the "Great Umayyad Qur'an" of a courtyard mosque (left) and a prayer hall consisting of four naves with a two-storey elevation and a transept leading off the mihrab. mosque. Fragments of the extant folios showing Sūrah al-Fātiḥah and Sūrah al-Nās.

The only surviving Arabic illuminated manuscript dating from before the 11th century is the "Great Umayyad Qur'an". Found in the Great Mosque in Sana'a, ornamentation of this manuscript incorporated motifs that are very similar to those used to decorate the Dome of the Rock, the Great Mosque of Damascus and the desert castles of Umayyads. Because of this the time of production of this Qur'an has been narrowed to between 691 and 743 CE. It is the only lavishly illuminated Qur'an codex extant that can be securely placed in the Umayyad period. It's currently housed in the Dar al-Makhtutat. The manuscript includes full illustrations that take up entire pages, and also sūrah dividers and ornamental borders. One of the miniatures representing Jannah is based on a cosmogram, and, on the reverse, a mosque.

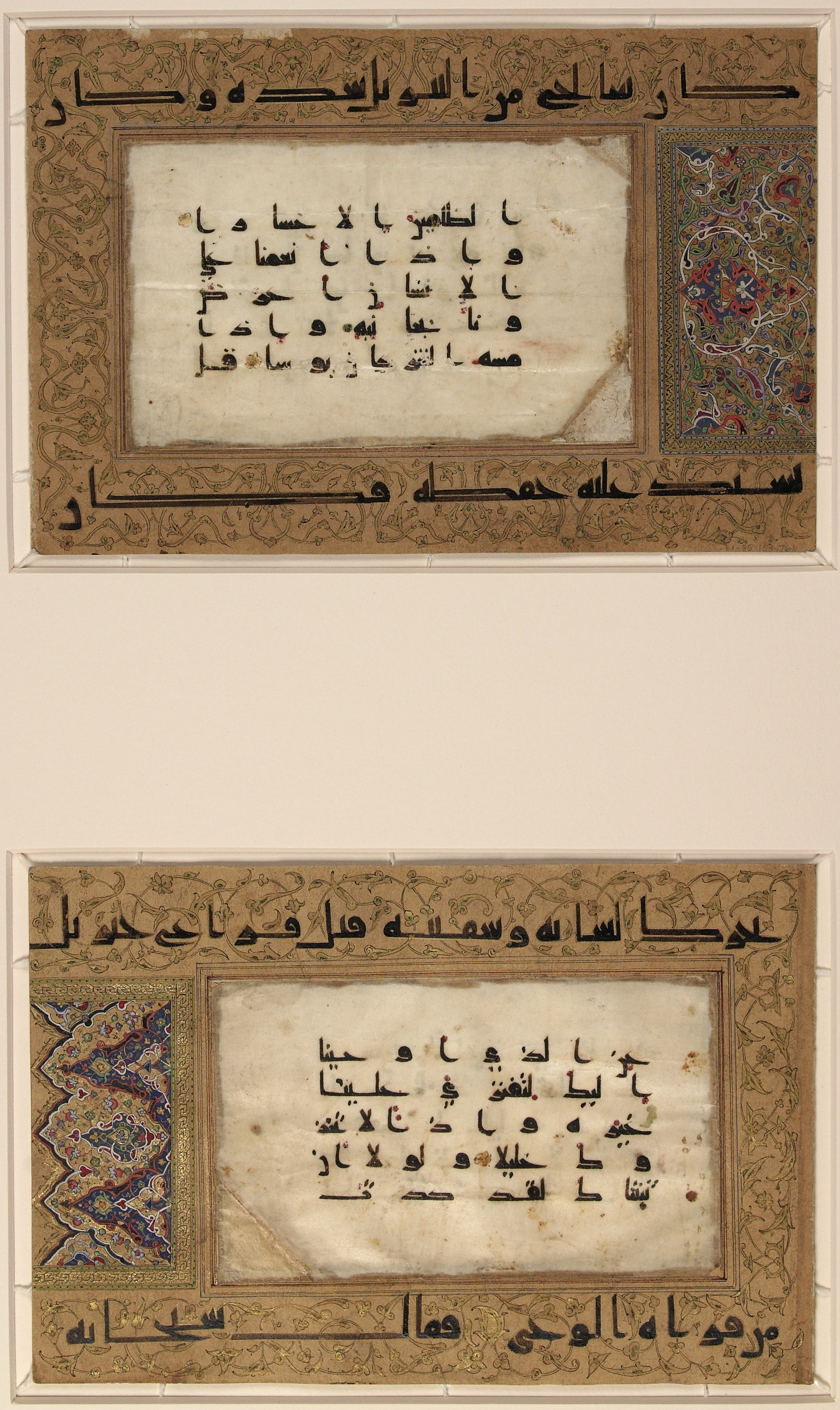
9th century Qur'anic fragments written in Kufic script.

=== Rise ===
The first illustrated Arabic manuscript still preserved from the 11th century is Abd al-Rahman al-Sufi's Book of Fixed Stars, dated from around 1009 (Bodleian Library, Marsh144). This astronomy work was copied by the author's son himself, from models that already existed in the previous century. It is then necessary to wait until the end of the twelfth century to find a boom in miniatures in the Arab world.

== Development ==
=== Abbasid Caliphate (750–1258) ===
Several Islamic monarchs enjoyed a long reign, such as the Abbasid caliph An-Nasir or the regent then king of Mosul Badr al-Din Lu'lu' (1218-1259), contributing to the prosperity of the region and the emergence of a rich cultural background. It is also in this city the class of wealthy merchants were likely to order such works. The manuscripts still conserved today correspond to the end of this period of prosperity, the first half of the fourteenth century.

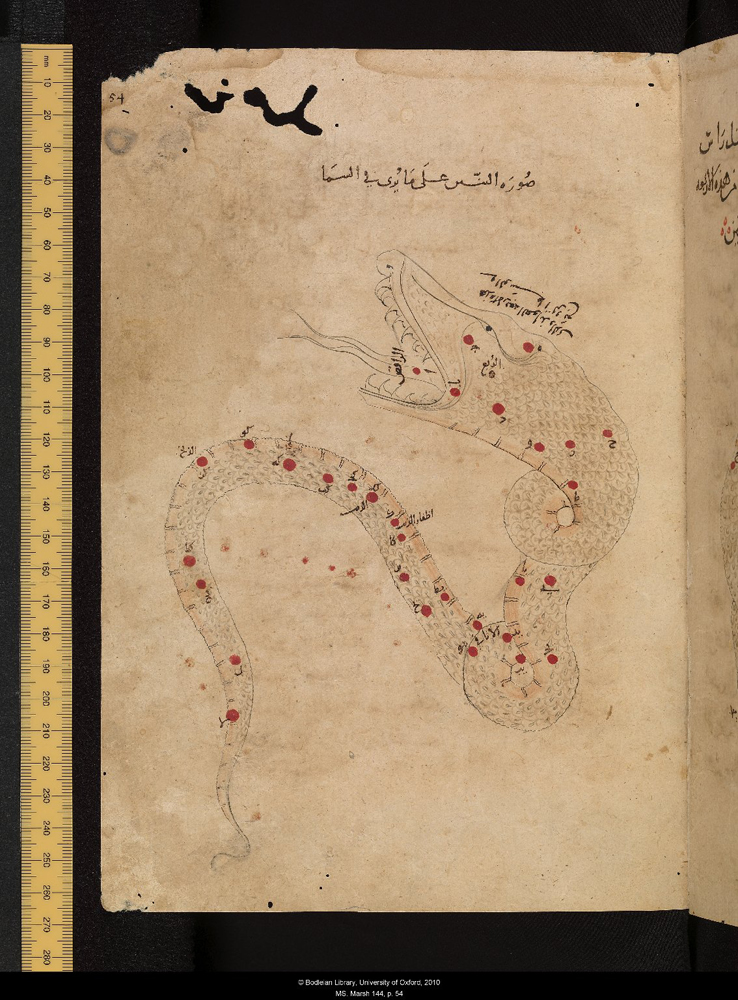
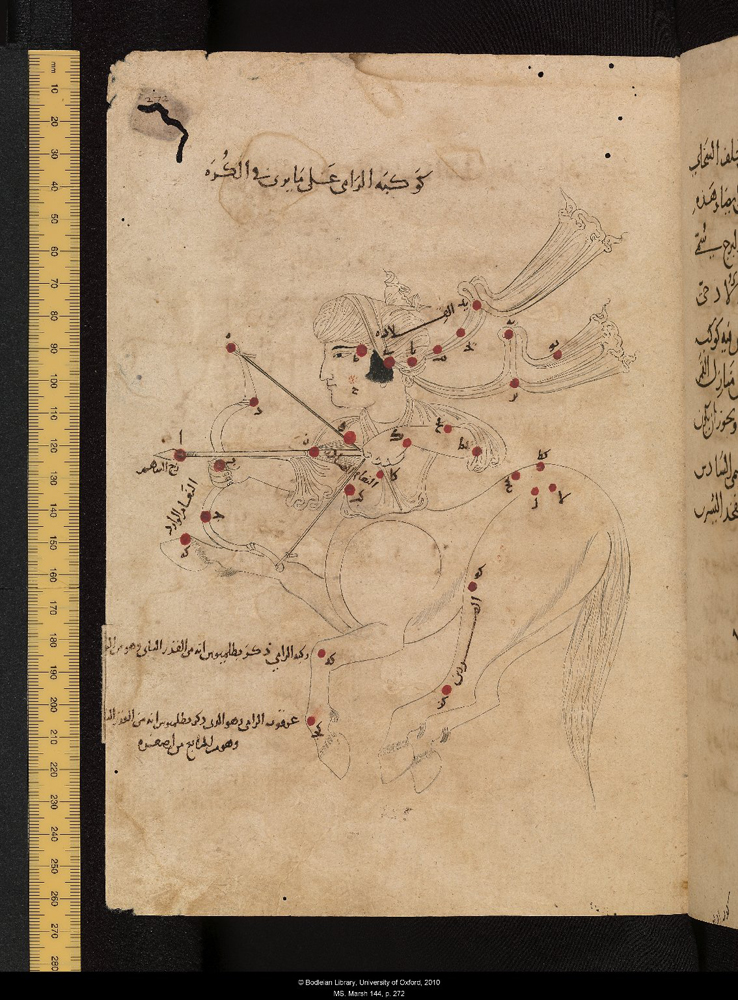
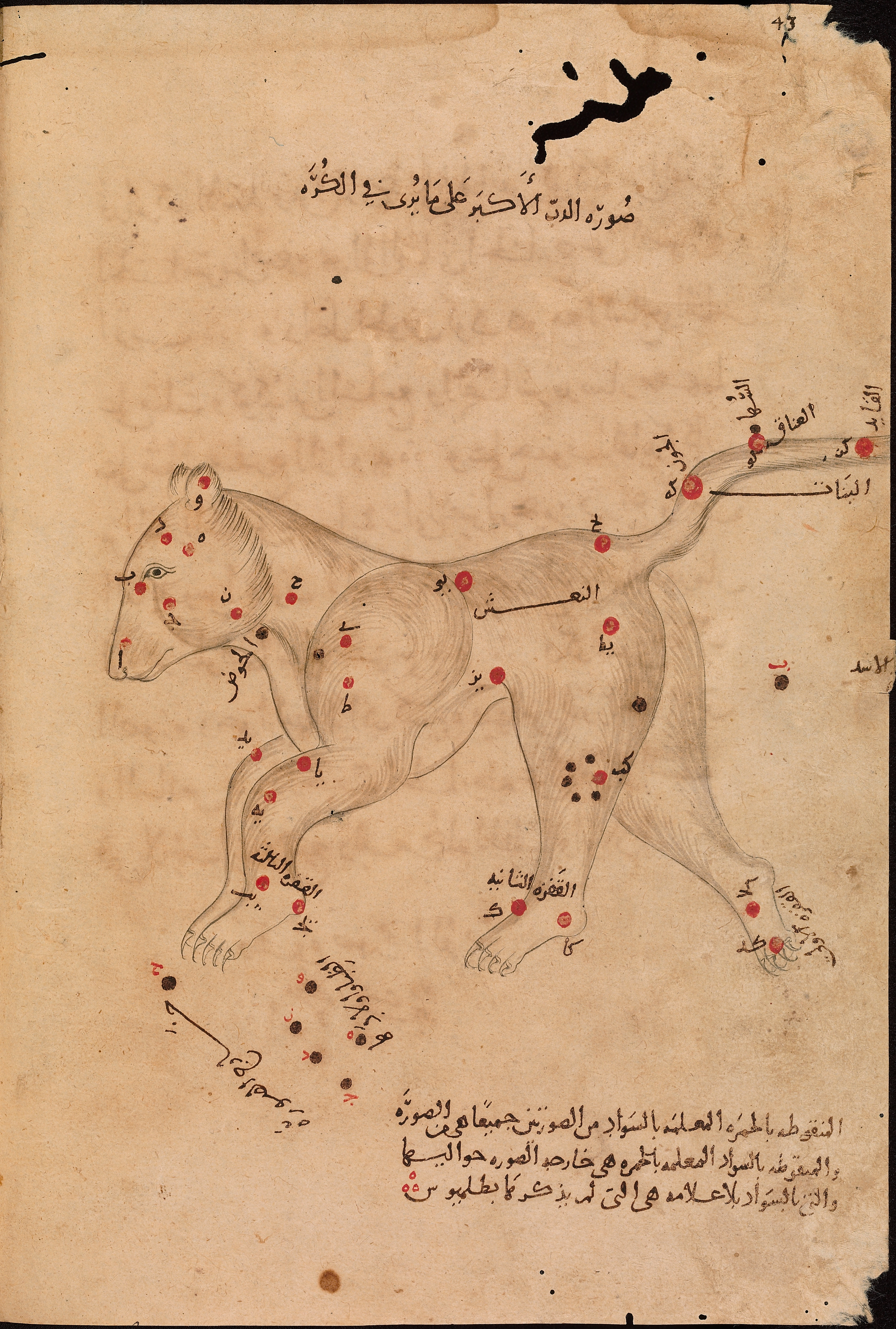
(From right to left) Book of Fixed Stars; Constellation of Draco, sagittarius and Ursa Major (The Great Bear), 1009 AD

The Arab society present at that time showed a great interest in theatrical shows and particularly in puppets and shadow theatre. The appearance of the characters depicted in the miniatures is reminiscent of the figurines from these shows. In addition, the epoch featured a great enthusiasm for the sessions or Maqamat al-Harīrī, tales featuring a jester character to whom many adventures happen. The combination of these elements of interest may explain the commissioning of illuminated manuscripts of this text. It also explains the birth of a new genre of painting, representing realistically the details of daily life contemporary to the painter of the illustration. Finally, this emergence of the image is also explained by the weakening of the ban on figurative representation in the arts during this period. One of the most famous centers in the Arab world was the Baghdad School, also known as the Arab school, it was a relatively short-lived yet influential center of Arab art developed during the late 12th century in the capital Baghdad of the ruling Abbasid Caliphate. The movement had largely died out by the early 14th century, five decades following the invasion of the Mongols in 1258 and the downfall of the Abbasids' rule.

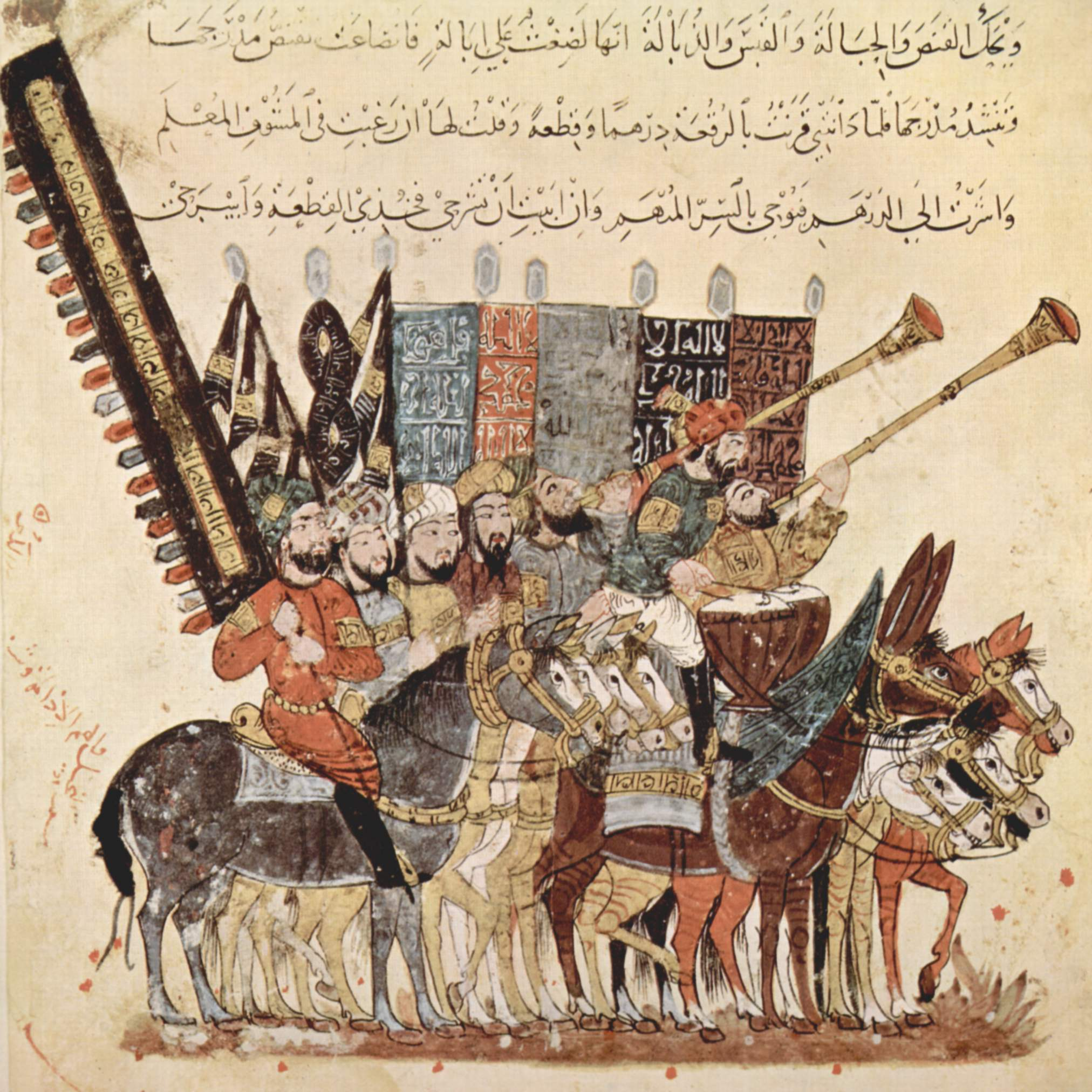
The 7th Maqāma of Al-Hariri, illustration by the Abbasid artist Yahya ibn Mahmud al-Wasiti from the 1237 manuscript (BNF ms. arabe 5847).

=== Fatimid Caliphate (909–1171) ===
Another example are the Fatimids who fueled a renaissance in Arabic figurative arts, thus developing a stylized and distinct style. The prevalence of books within the Fatimid empire was demonstrated by the existence of the Dār al-'Ilm, or the House of Knowledge. In 1045 CE, the Dār al-'Ilm was reported to contain 6,500 volumes of scientific and literary subjects. When the Fatimid dynasty dissolved during the twelfth century, the libraries and collections of books that existed in Cairo were dispersed, making it difficult to locate any complete manuscripts. Only fragments of text and paper are able to provide information of the content and style of Fatimid manuscripts.

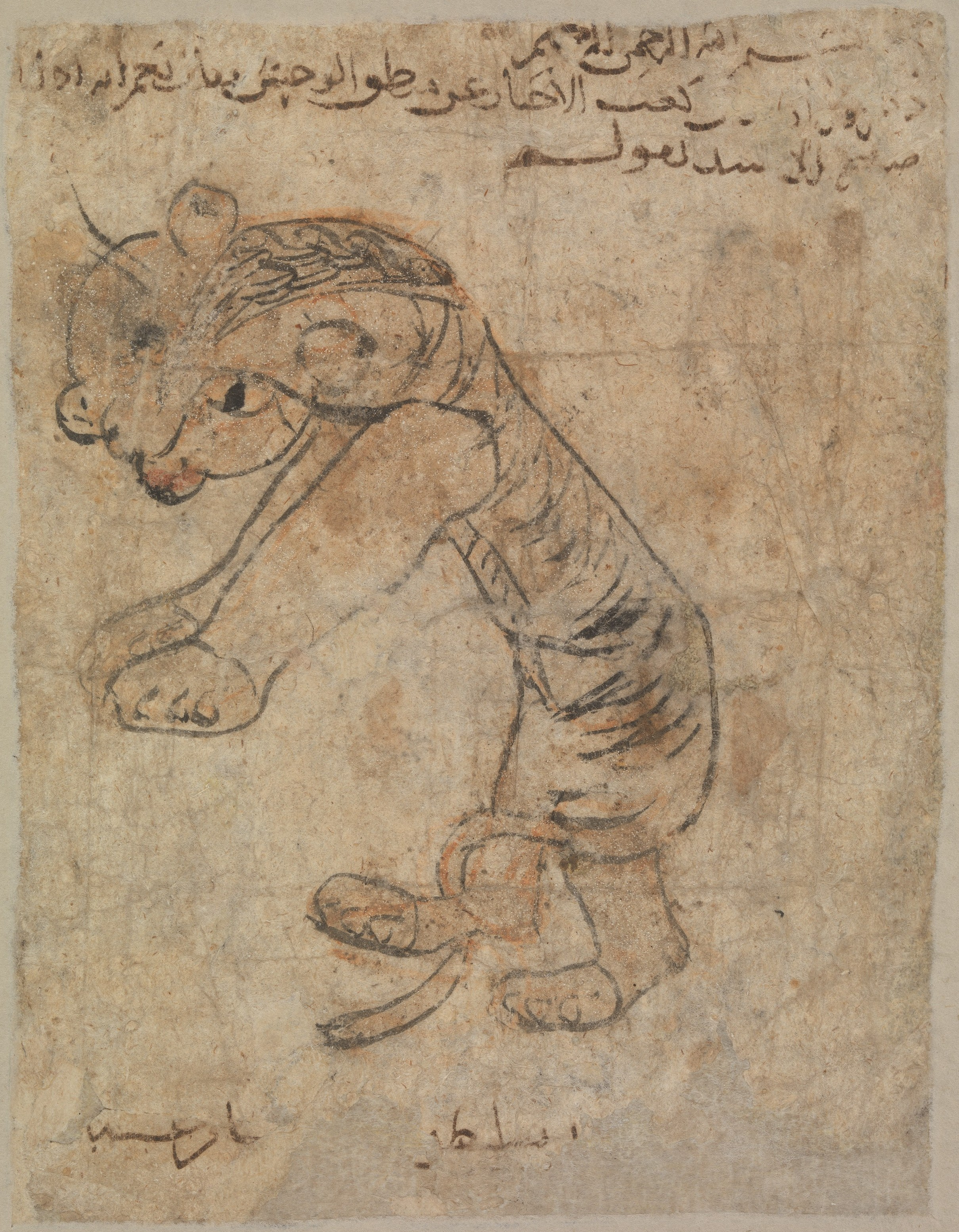
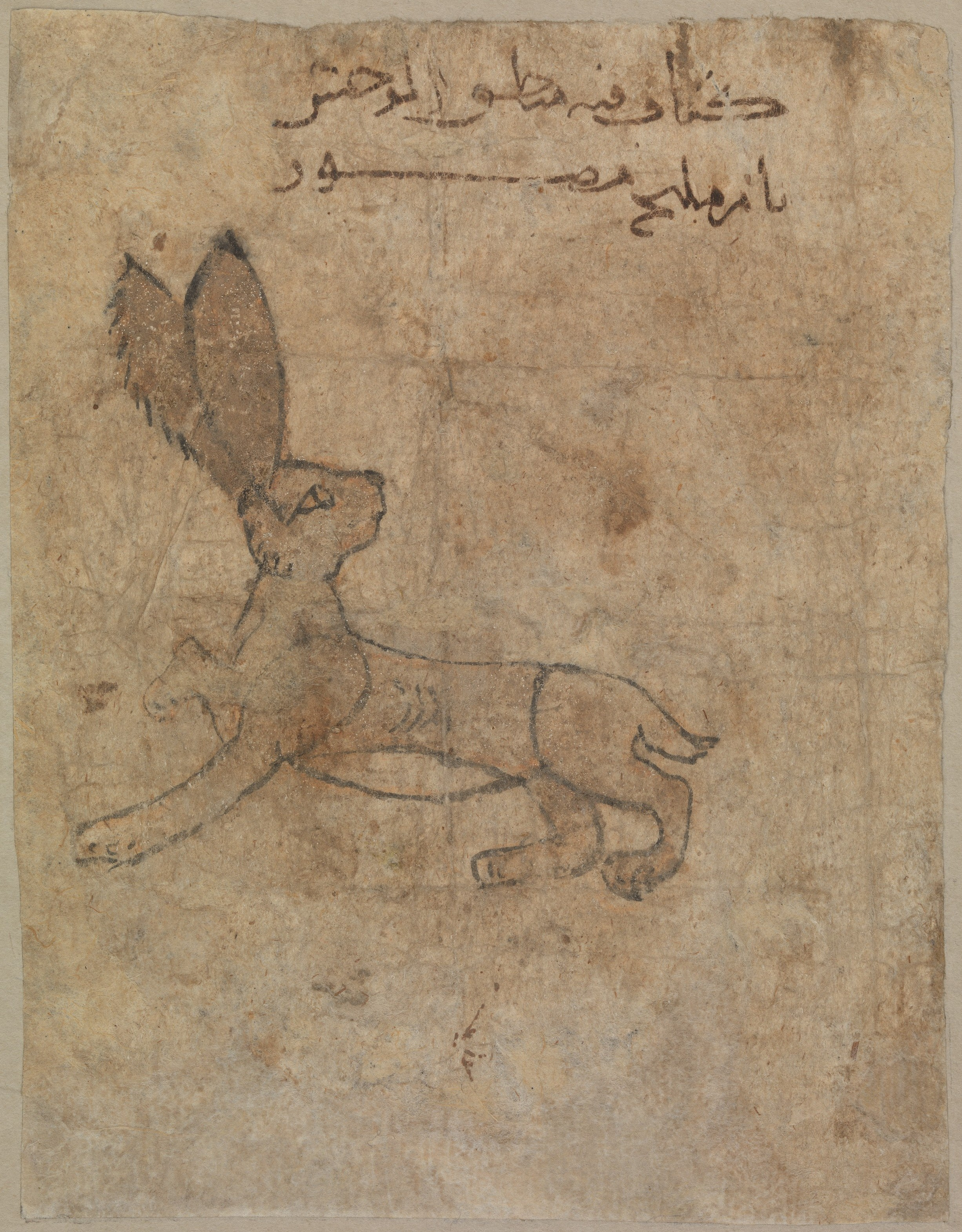
Examples from the Fustat fragments

It is rare to have an example of both text and illustrations of the same page, which makes it difficult to gather information about illuminated manuscripts. In some cases, it is possible that illustrations were added to an already existing text at a later date. Fatimid illustration style can be demonstrated by one surviving piece of paper, which was excavated in Cairo. This single sheet of paper has drawings on both sides; one side showing a lion, and the other, a hare. While it is unclear whether this page originated from a work of, potentially, scientific or zoological subject matter, it is an example of larger patterns of naturalistic and figural representation within Fatimid art.

=== Mamluk Sultanate (1250–1517) ===
Mamluk painting marks the last revival of miniature paintings in the Arab world. In this style, a more rigid style is found most commonly. A new interest is developed in the field of war treatises. Formalism is the main characteristic of the manuscripts of this period: the decorations are schematic and reduced to a minimum, geometric compositions, stylized folds of clothing. The features of the characters sometimes take on those of Mongol rulers, depicting "Asian eyes", similar to those of certain turkic Mamluk emirs and monarchs. The oldest manuscript of this style dates back to 1273 with Ibn Butlan's Banquet of the Physicians (Ambrosian Library, A.125 Inf.). One of the most exemplary manuscripts of this style is the Maqamat of Vienna, probably painted in Egypt in 1334.

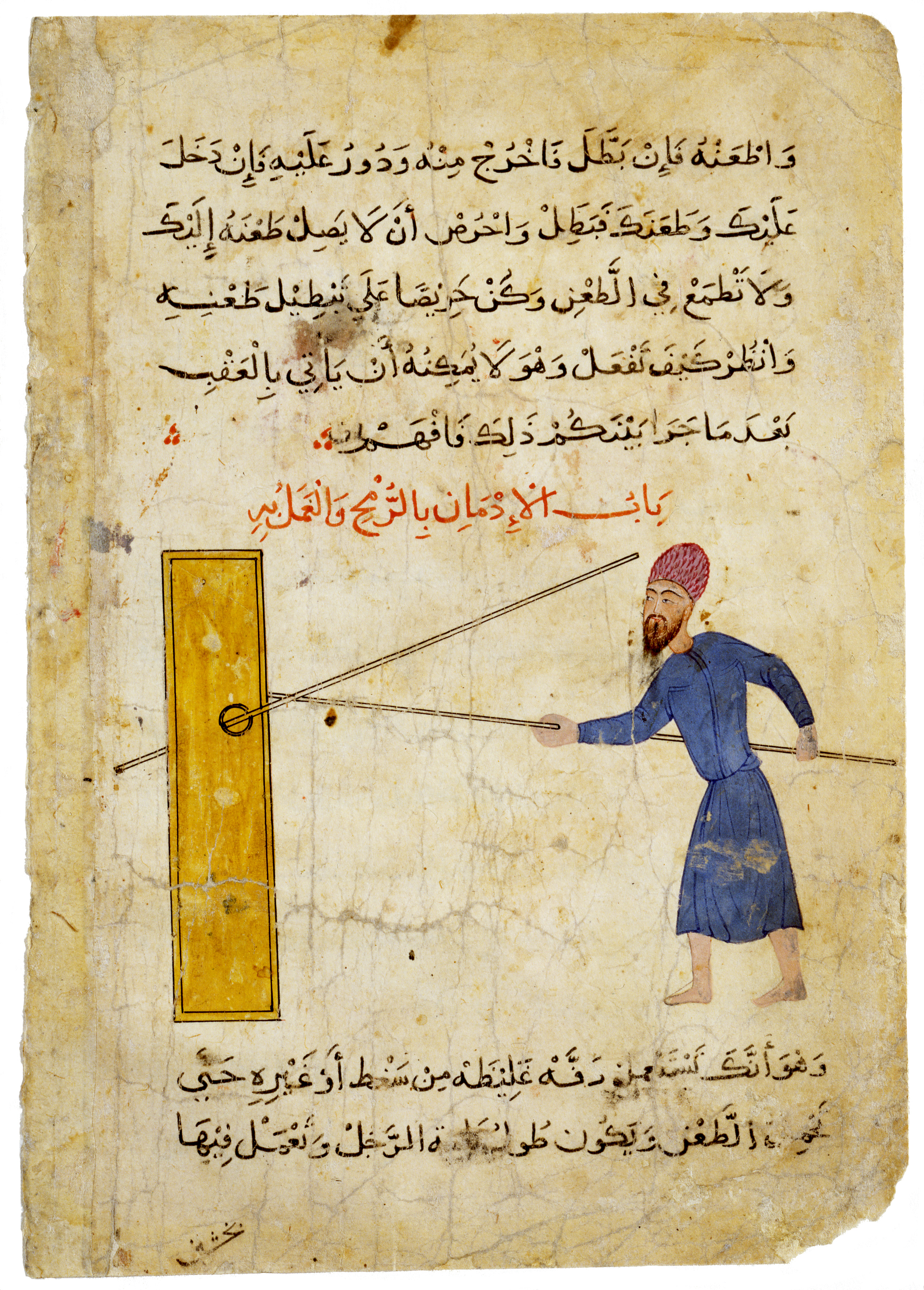
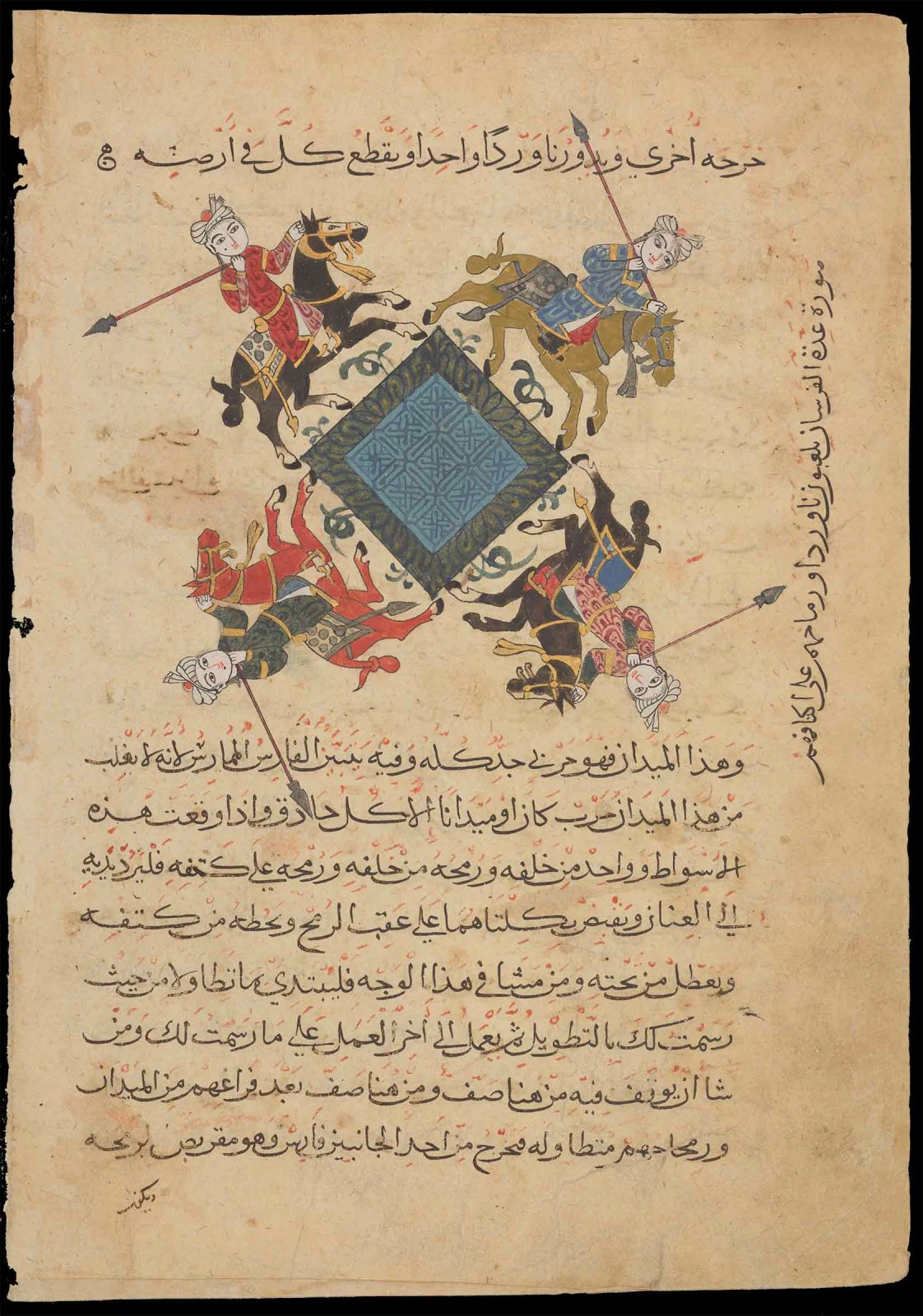
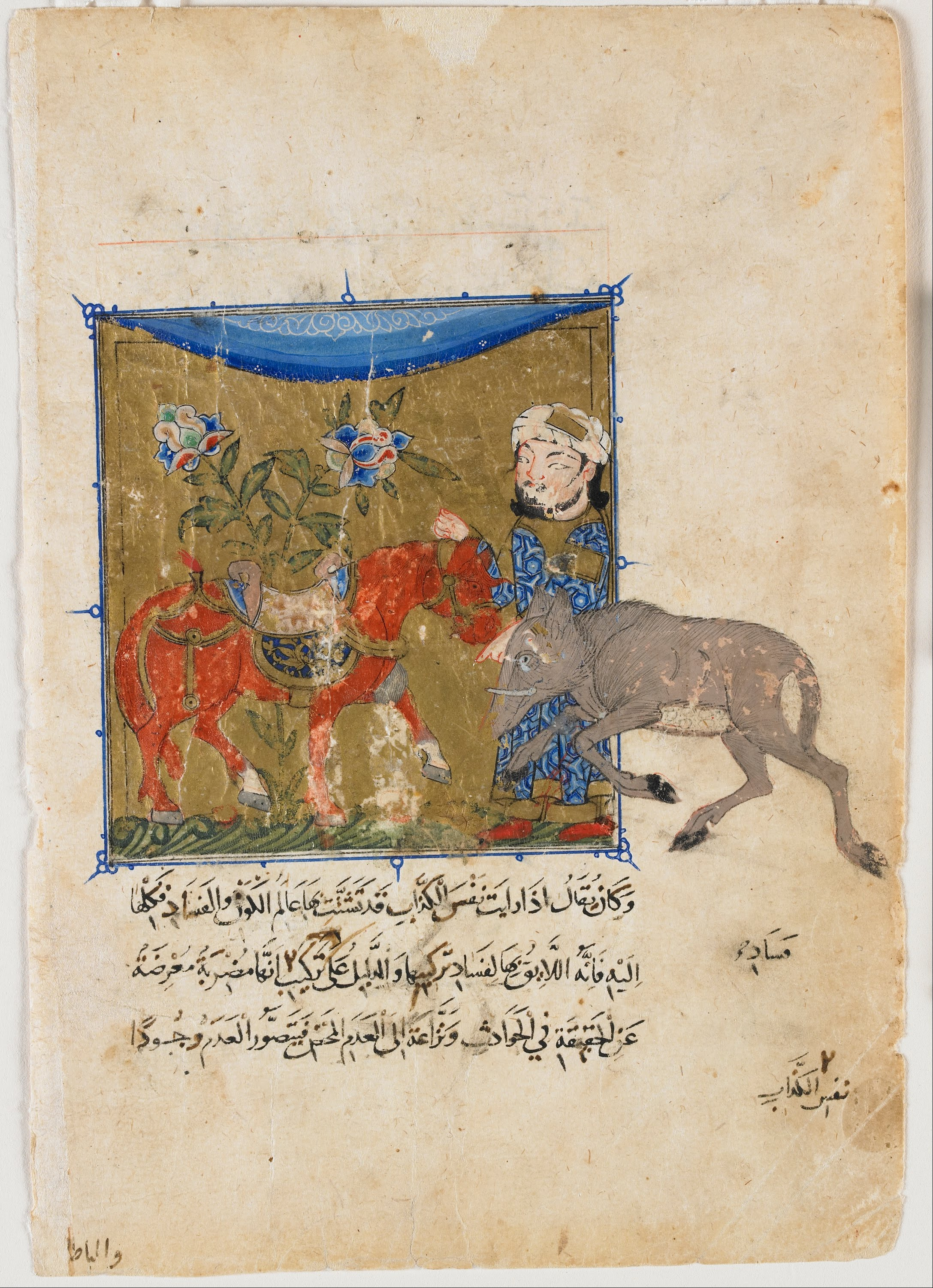
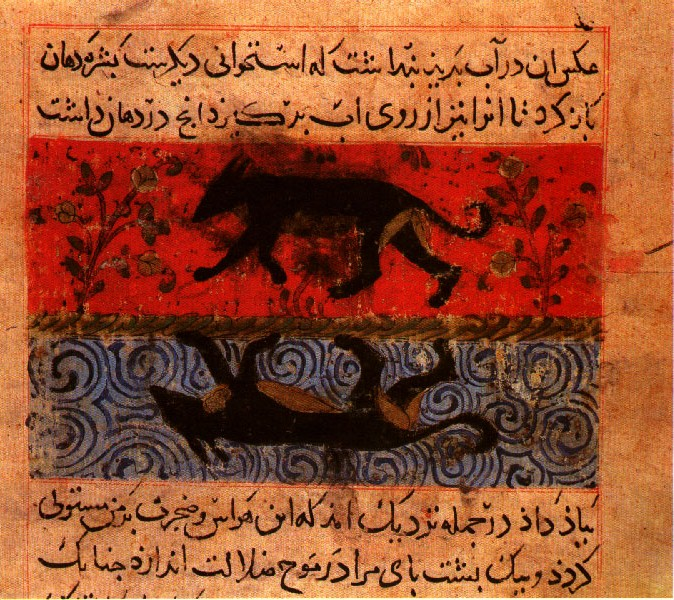
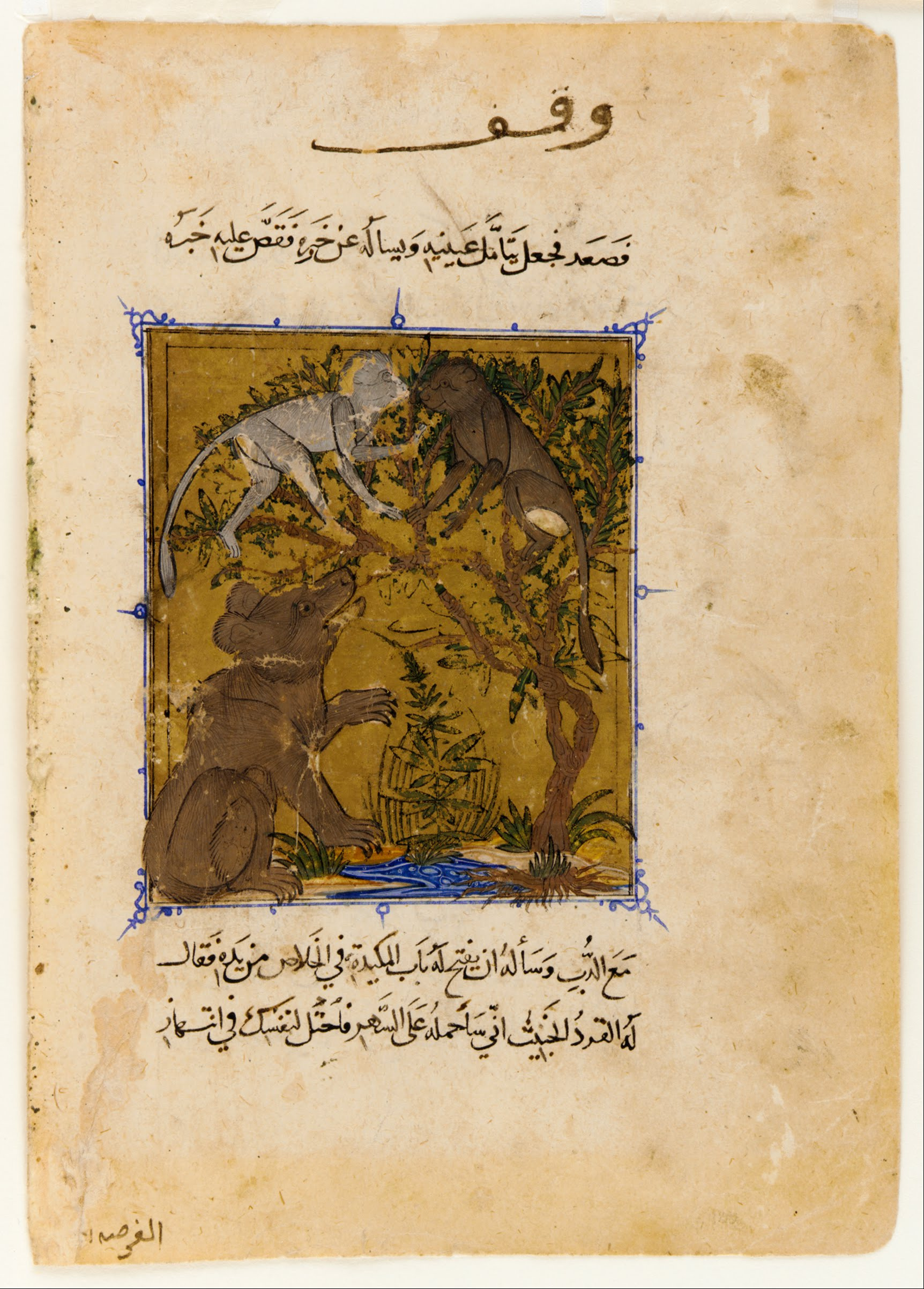
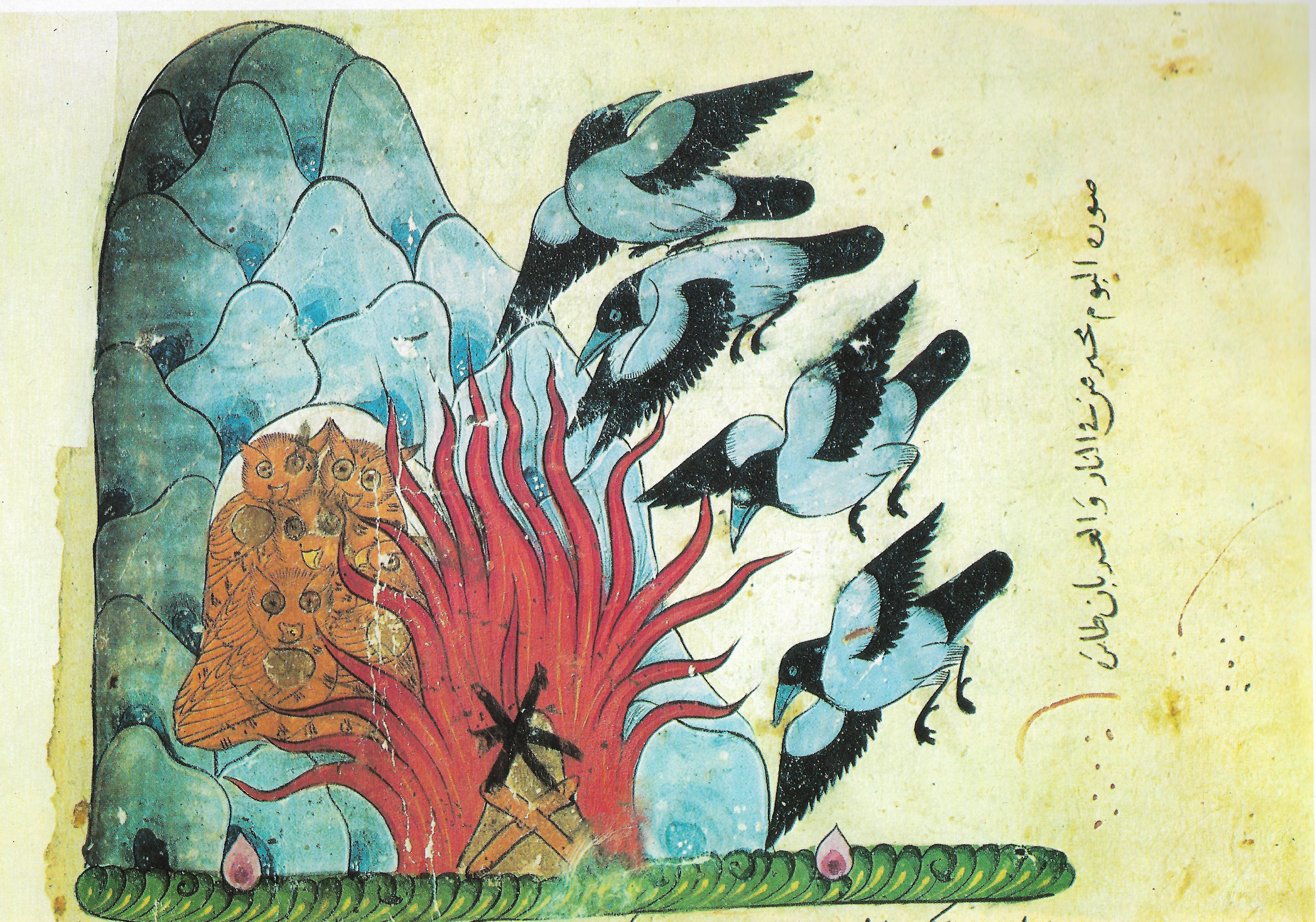
Examples from Mamluk codices.

Cairo, Damascus, and Aleppo were among the main centers of manuscript production. Mamluk-period Qur'ans were richly illuminated and exhibit stylistic similarities with those produced under the contemporary Ilkhanids in Iran. The production of high-quality paper at this time also allowed for pages to be larger, which in turn encouraged artists to elaborate new motifs and designs to fill these larger formats. Some manuscripts could be monumental in size; for example, one Qur'an manuscript produced for Sultan Sha'ban measured between 75 and 105 cm (30–41 in) tall. One of the stylistic features that distinguished Mamluk manuscript decoration was the presence of gilded foliate scrollwork over pastel-coloured backgrounds set within wide margins. Frontispieces were often decorated with star-shaped or hexagonal geometric motifs.

== Decline ==
The sack of Baghdad in 1258 by the Mongol armies marked the beginning of a decline in the art of illuminated books. The miniature survived in Syria and Egypt, under Mamluk rule, however, the style became less refined, and more naïve. With the fall of the Mamluks following the Battle of Anjar, most Arab countries became peripheral regions of the Ottoman and Persian empires and only the centers far away from the Arab world of these empires perpetuated this art.

=== Mongol rule ===
Arab miniaturists had to adapt to the tastes of their new rulers and the Mongols who brought with them Chinese influences. This influence is felt in particular in the book of Manafi' al-hayawan by Ibn Bukhtishu (Pierpont Morgan Library, M.500), the Vestiges of the past of the University of Edinburgh (Ms.161) dated 1307 or even The marvels of creation and their peculiarities from the Bavarian State Library (C.Ar.464). However, this art continued regressing, Iraq gradually becoming a satellite region of the Ilkhanate and the network of local sponsors gradually disappeared.

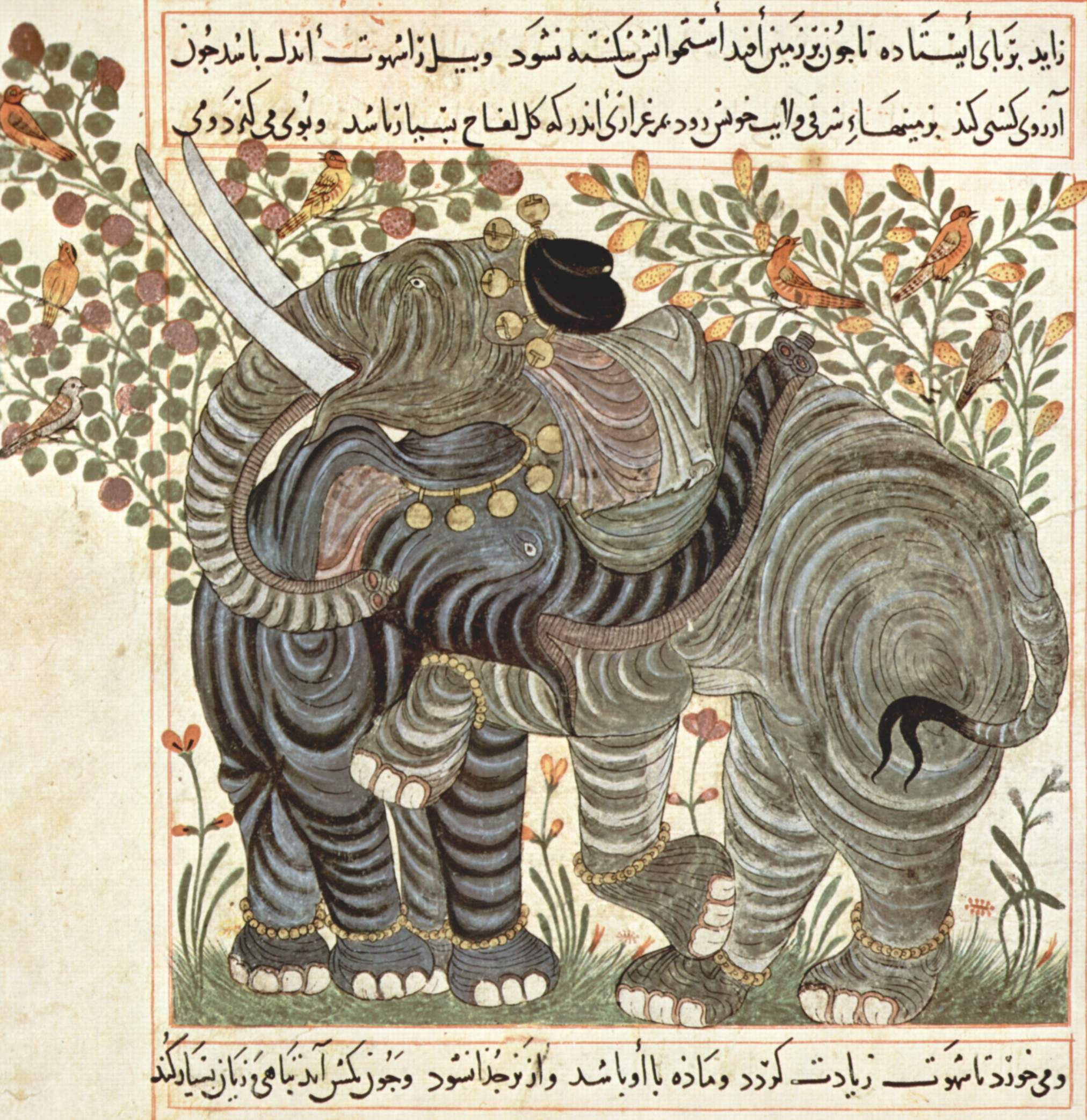
kitab fawa'id al hayawan, Pierpont Morgan Library

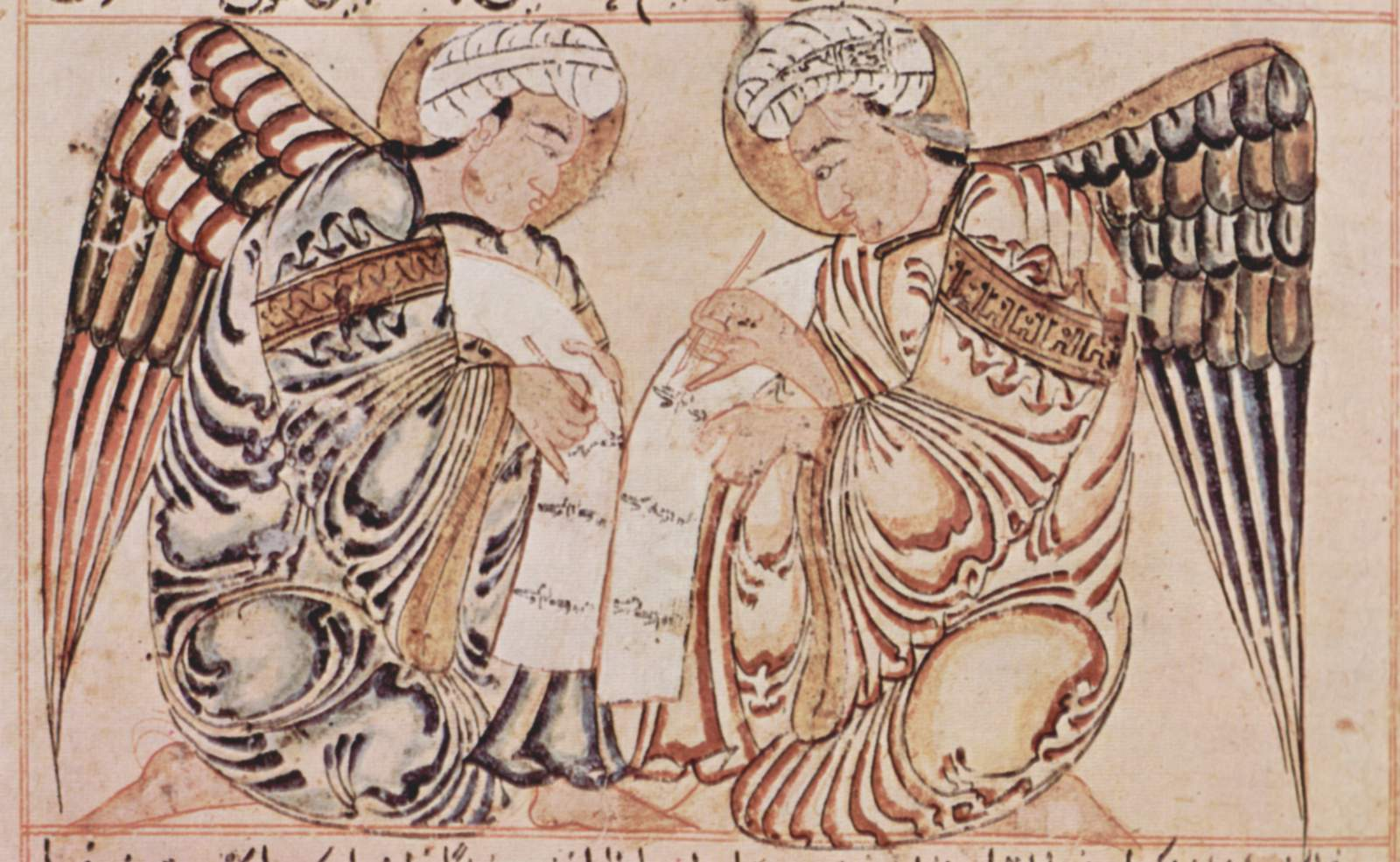
ʿAjāʾib al-makhlūqāt wa-gharāʾib al-mawjūdāt, library of Bavaria

=== Last traces ===
One of the last important illustrated Arabic manuscripts is a copy of Al-Qazwini's Wonders of Creation dated around 1370 and 1380 in Baghdad (Freer Gallery of Art, 54.33-114). It shows both Mongol and Persian influences, although it still remains faithful to the caliphal classical Arabic tradition. Subsequently, the few rare manuscripts still produced in this region lost their originality and almost totally assimilated to the Ottoman or Persian style.

== Influences ==
Figurative art has been known to Arabs since pre-Islamic times. Many examples of figurative representations such as frescoes and reliefs of humans and animals adorn the palaces of the Umayyad period, as on the Mshatta Facade, or the desert castles of the Levant, or the harems of the Abbasid era.

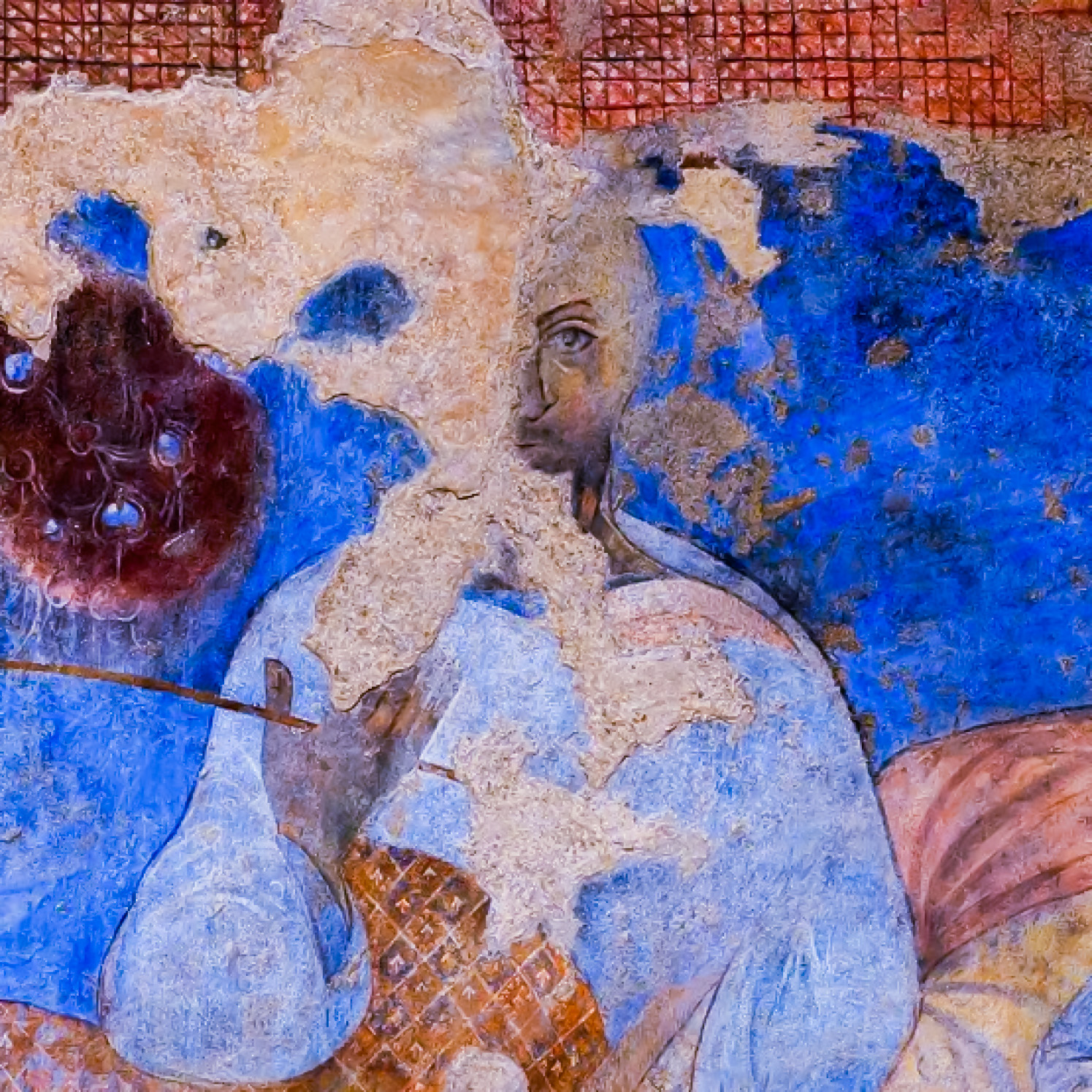
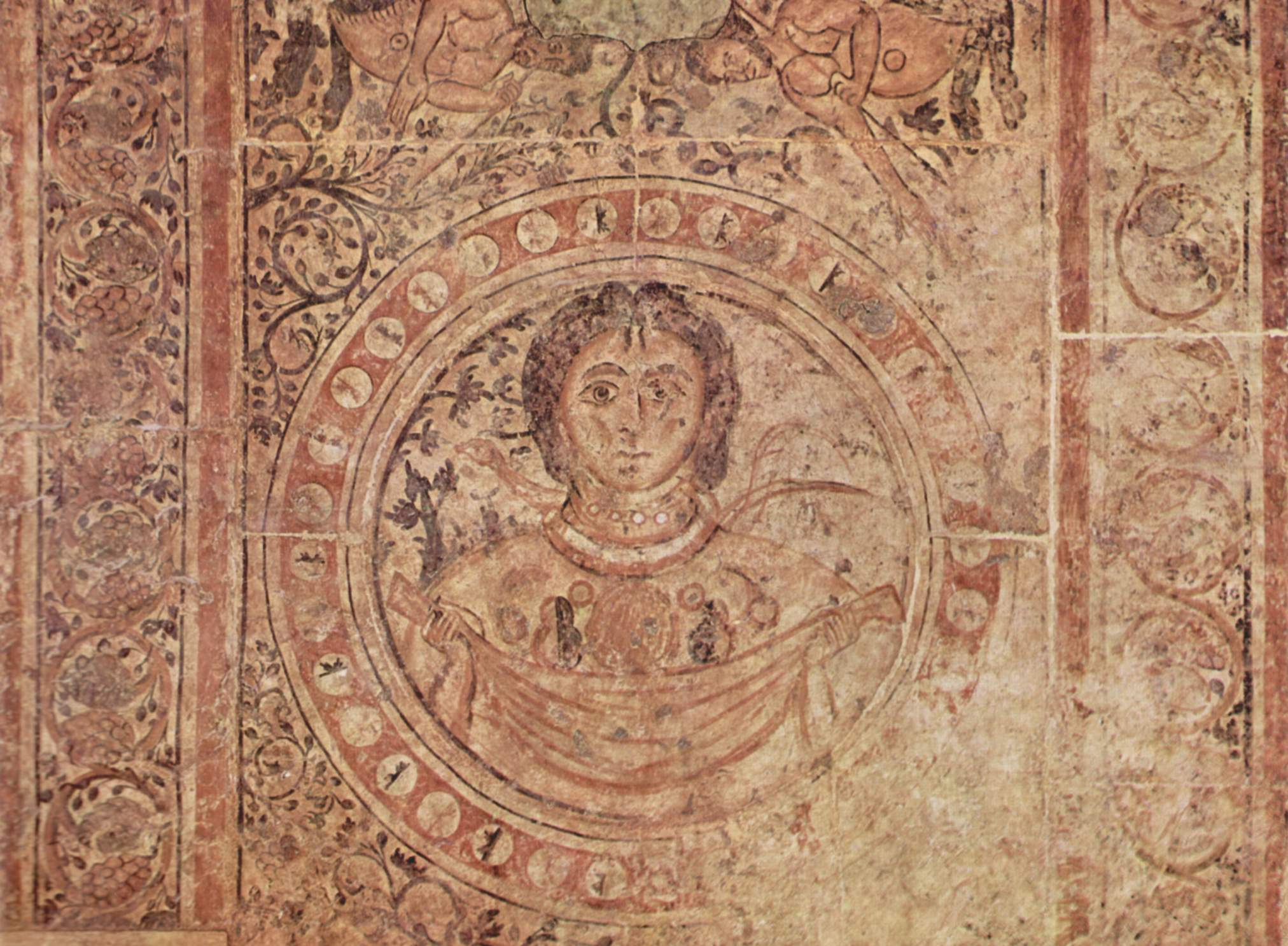
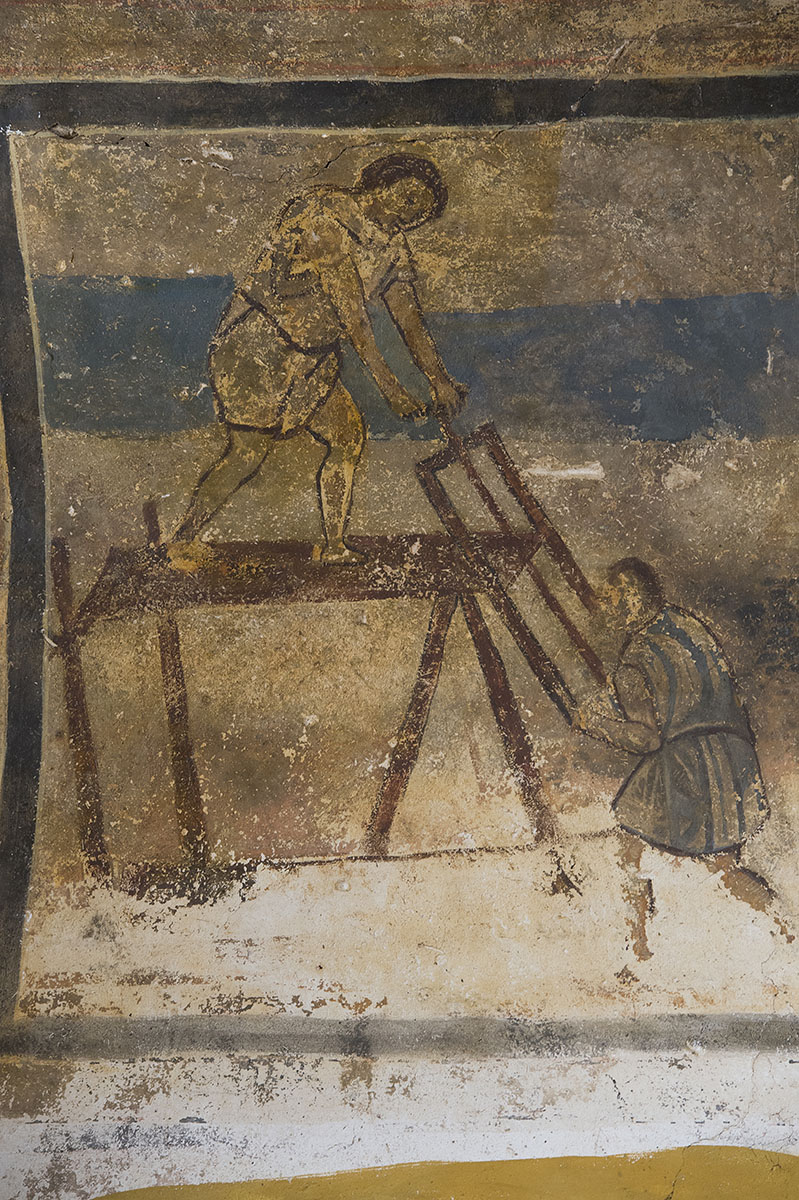
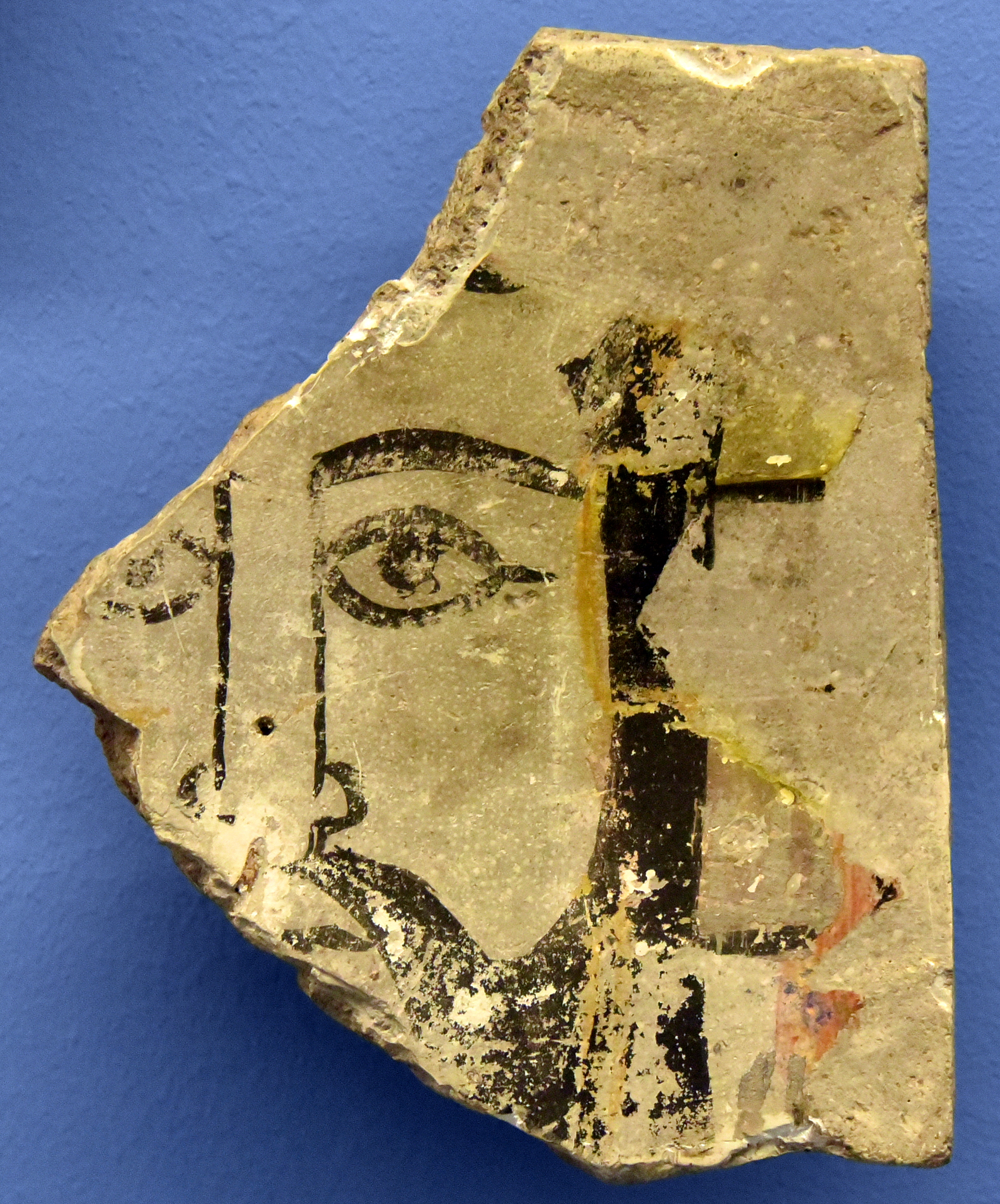
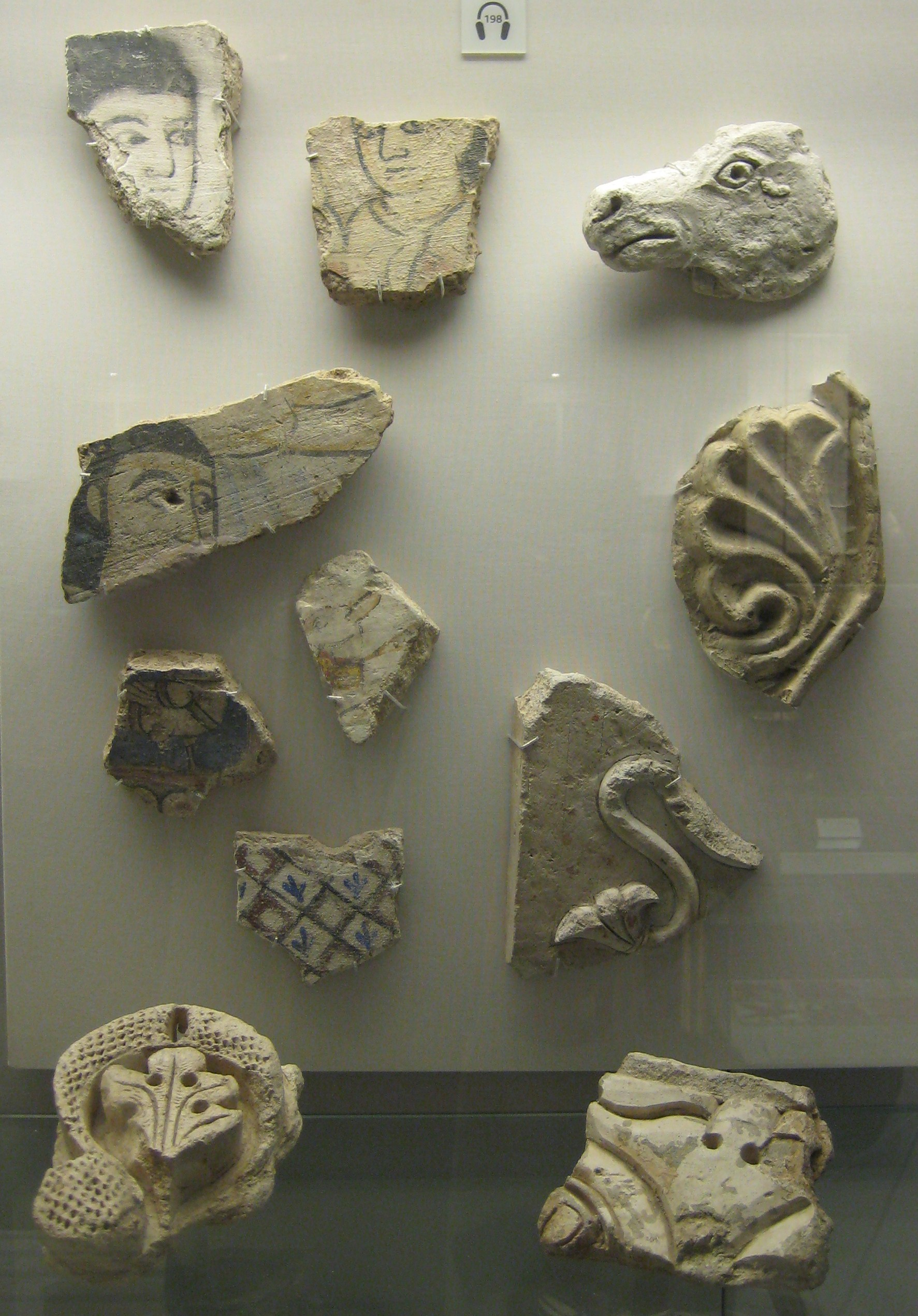
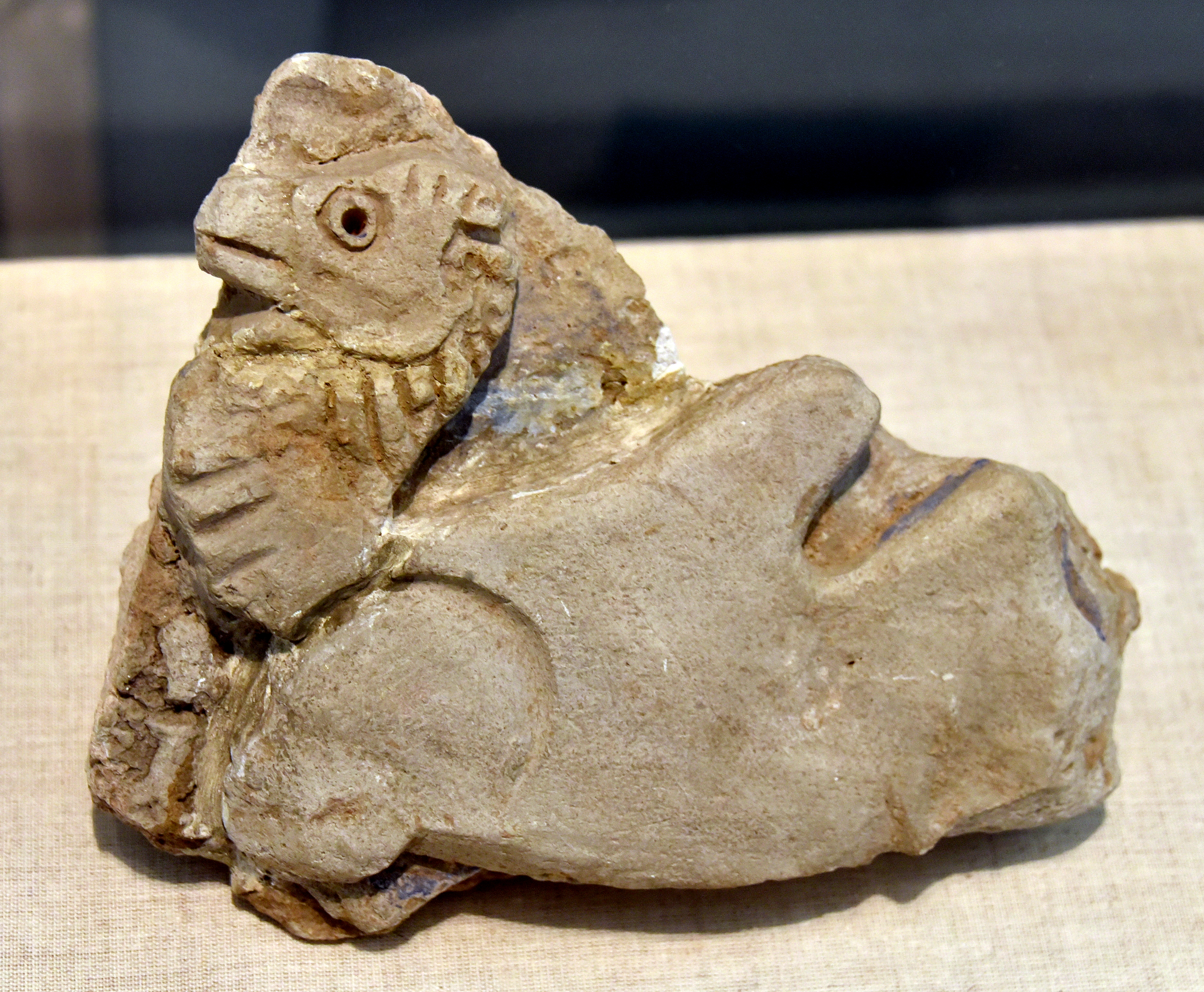
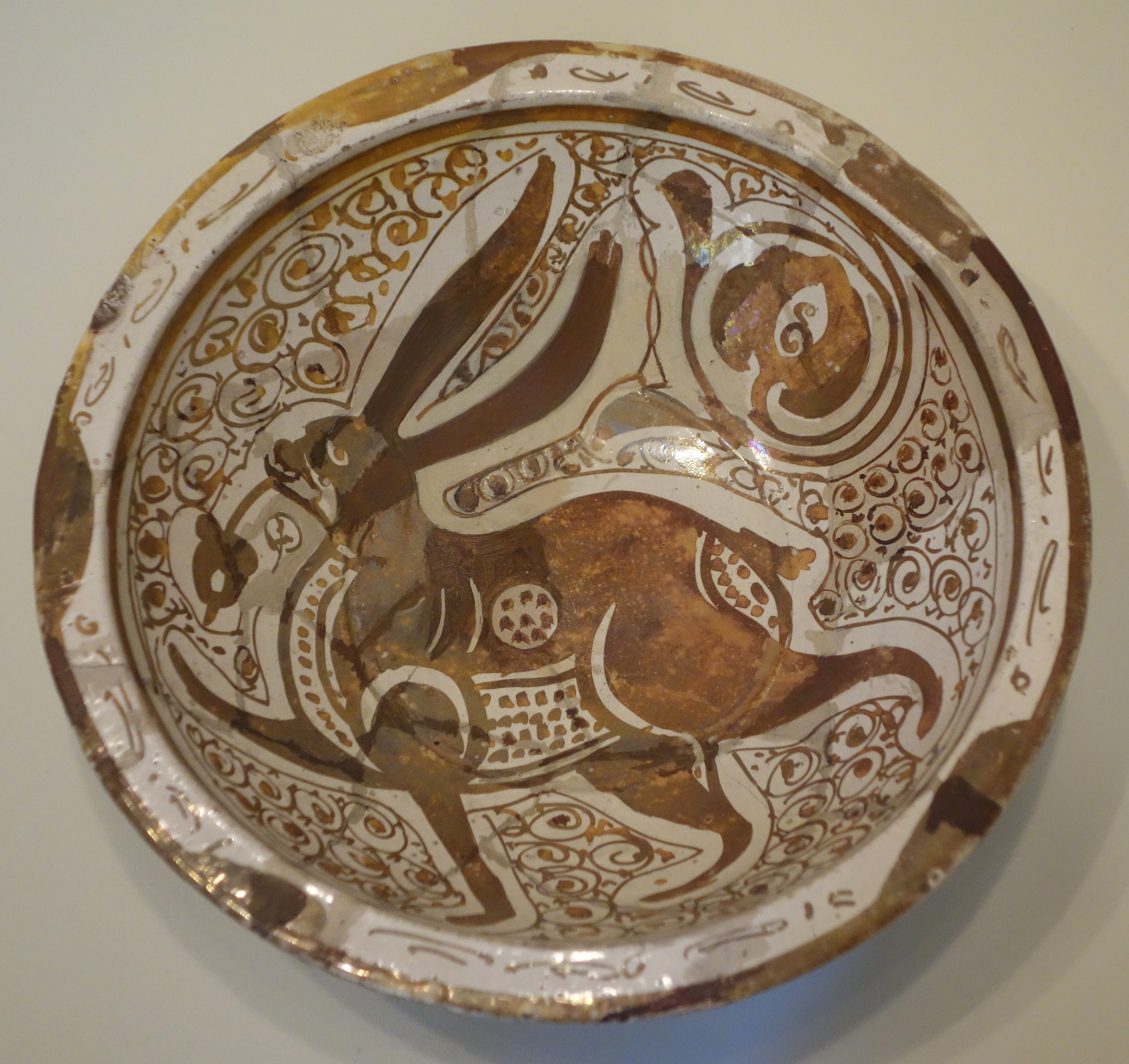
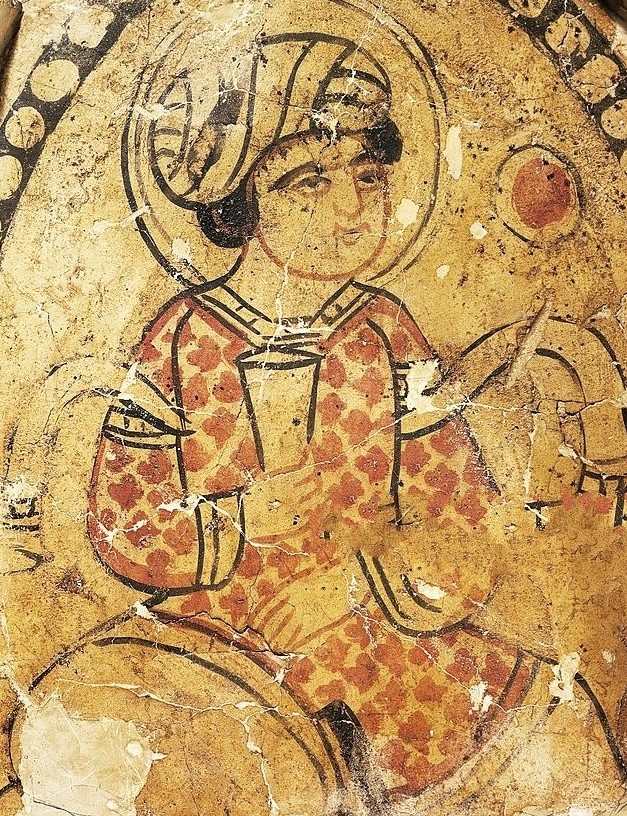
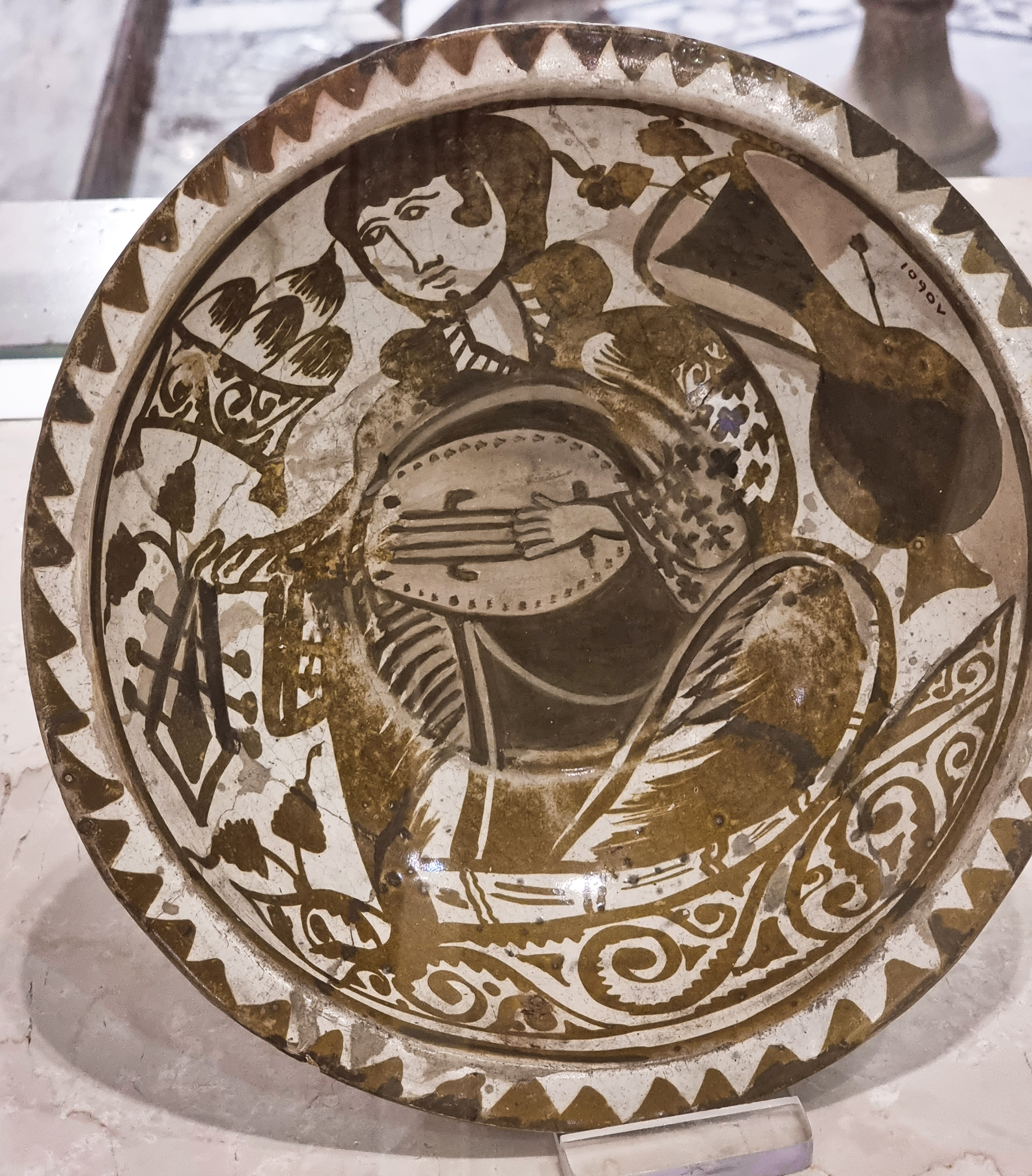
(1st row) Various examples of early Umayyad paintings in Qusayr 'Amra. (2nd row) Examples of Abbasid Figural paintings from Samarra. (3rd row) Examples of Fatimid art.

=== Persian influence ===
Several Arabic manuscripts have frontispieces representing princes surrounded by their courts. Among these works, although intended for commoners, wealthy merchants or others, some have retained the frontispiece of the Persian manuscripts from which they were inspired. These prince portraits represent hieratic (highly formalised) and frozen characters. These are generally literary works intended for entertainment.

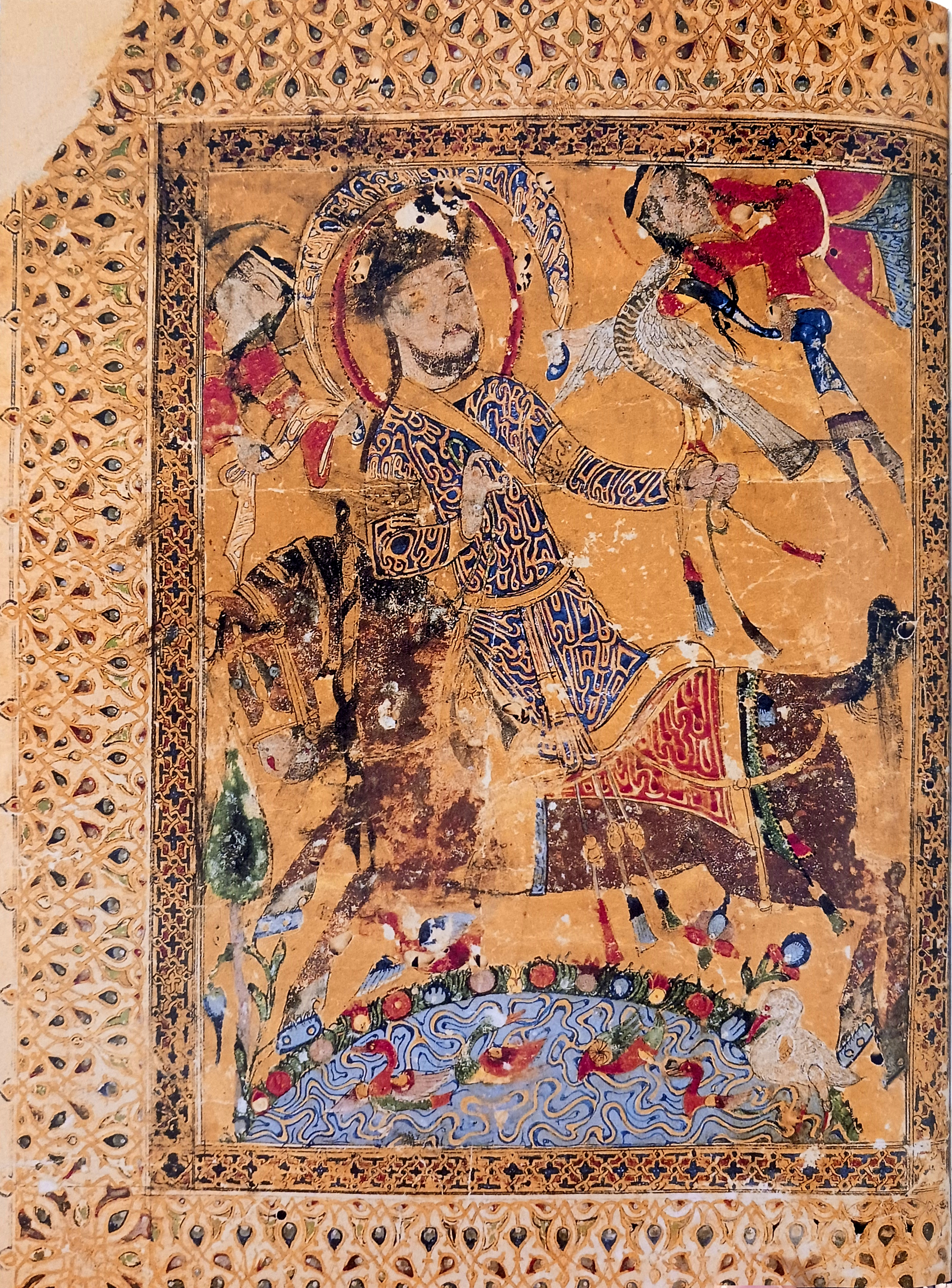
Page of a manuscript of the Kitāb al-Aghānī, 13th century AD.

=== Syro-Byzantine influences ===
At the end of the twelfth century, a new influence appeared; it was medieval painting that came through Byzantine illumination developed in Syria. Christian iconography was taken up but adapted to the Muslim context. The manuscript of Dioscorides of Topkapi takes up models taken from Byzantine manuscripts that can be found in the Dioscorides of Vienna copied in Constantinople in the sixth century. But this influence can be found in manuscripts without any relation with ancient subjects, as in several manuscripts of the Maqamat. For example, In the Hariri of 1222 (BNF Ar.6094), the figures in the miniatures wear turbans while having Byzantine features and attitudes close to Christ or his apostles.

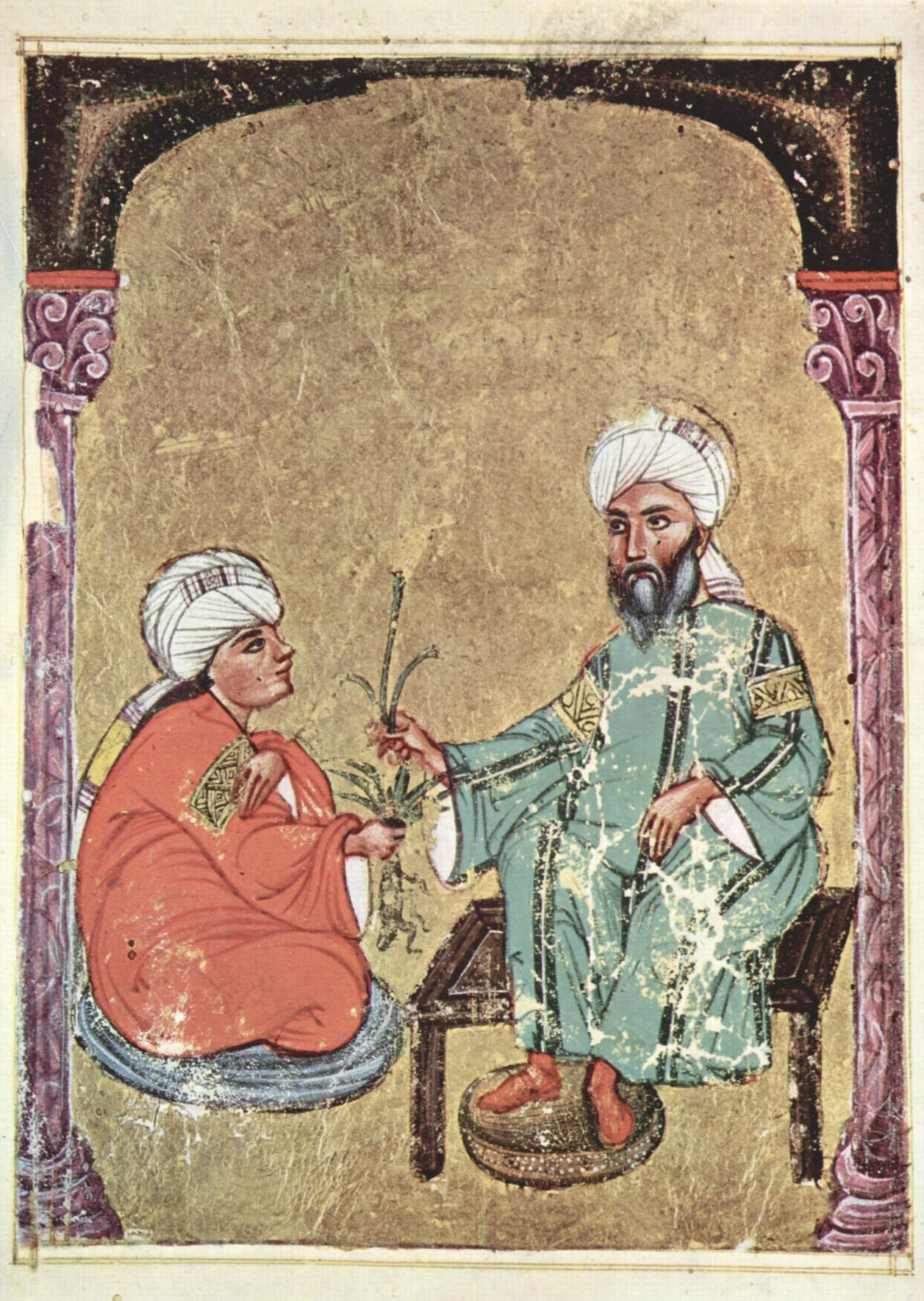
Dioscorides of Topkapi

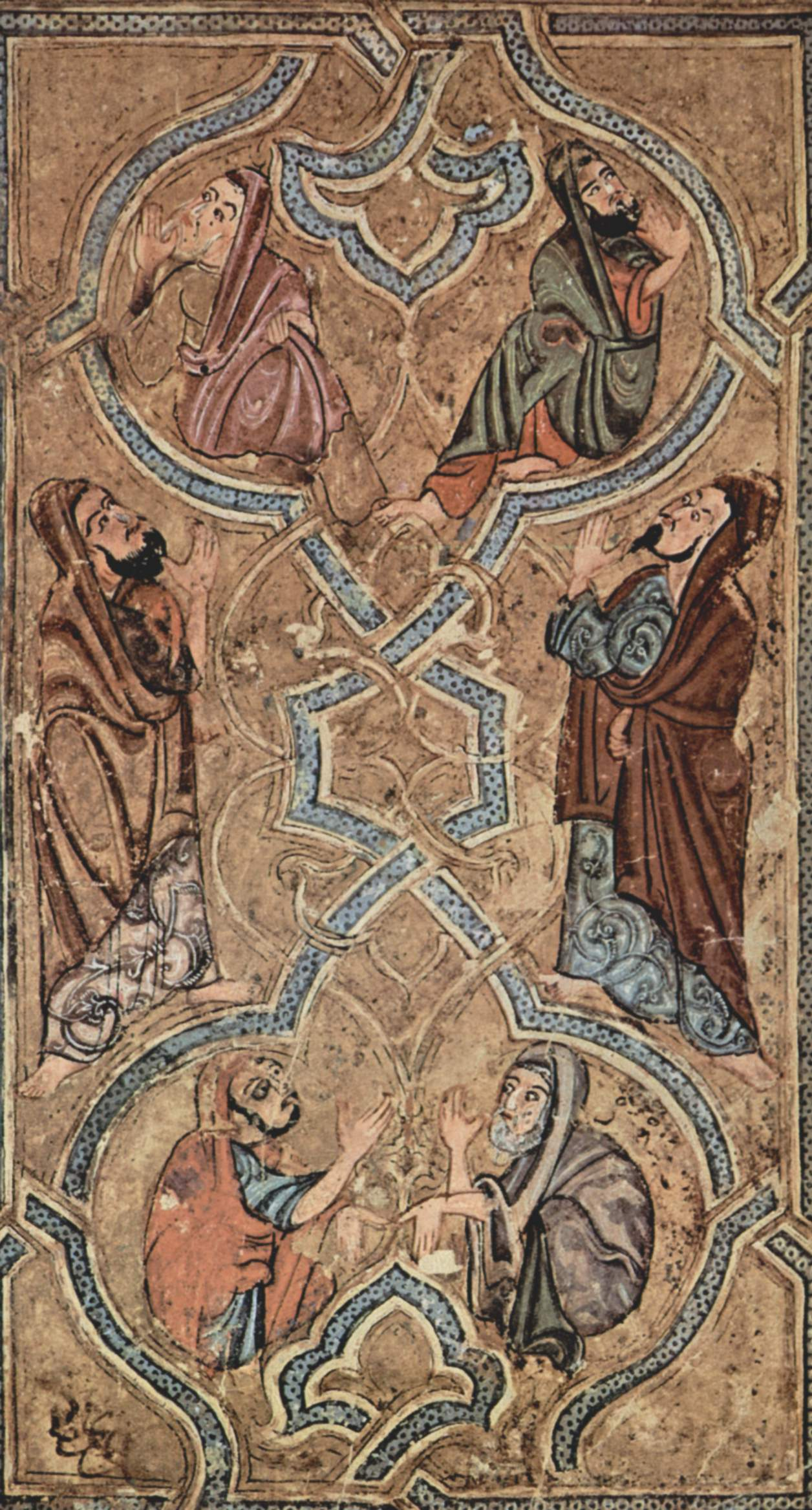
Book of Selected Maxims and Aphorisms of Al-Mubashshir, palace of topkapi.

== Materials and techniques ==
Painting materials
Color(s)	Source(s)
Red/pink أَحْمَر/وَرْدِي	Orpiment, (رهج أصفر), chemically arsenic sulfide, As_{2}S_{3}, found in volcanic fumaroles, low-temperature hydrothermal veins, and hot springs.; Red lead, (hist. :الإسرنج, current. :أكسيد الرصاص الثنائي والرباعي), chemically lead tetroxide, Pb_{3}O_{4}, found in nature as the mineral minium, or made by heating white lead; Vermilion, (مسحوق الزنجفر), chemically mercury sulfide, HgS, and found in nature as the mineral cinnabar.
Yellow أَصْفَر	Orpiment and vermillion; Realgar, (رهج الغار), chemically arsenic sulfide, α-As_{4}S_{4.}; Pararealgar, chemically arsenic sulfide, As_{4}S_{4}, It forms gradually from realgar under exposure to light
Blue أَزْرَق	Plant-based substances such as: Indigo, (نيلي), derived from the plant Indigofera tinctoria; Chemical- and mineral-based colors, including: Ultramarine, (صبغة اللازورد), made from the minerals lapis lazuli or azurite; and; Azurite, (اللَّازَوَرْد), Cu_{3}(CO_{3})_{2}(OH)_{2}, a soft, deep-blue copper mineral produced by weathering of copper ore deposits.
White أَبْيَض	White lead, (أبيض الرصاص), chemically basic lead carbonate, 2PbCO_{3}·Pb(OH)_{2}, and historically made by corroding sheets of lead with vinegar, and covering that with decaying matter, such as dung, to provide the necessary carbon dioxide for the chemical reaction.
Brown بُنِيّ	Ultramarine, vermilion, realgar and pararealgar; Manganese(IV) oxide, (أكسيد المنغنيز الرباعي), inorganic compound with the formula MnO 2. This blackish or brown solid occurs naturally as the mineral pyrolusite, which is the main ore of manganese and a component of manganese nodules.; Hematite, (الهيماتيت or الشَاذَنَج or الشَادَنَه or حَجَر الدَّم or الحجر الهندي or حجر الطور or الحديد الصيني), iron oxide, Fe_{2}O_{3}, widely found in rocks and soils. Dark brown-red: realgar, pararealga
Green أَخْضَر	Green was achieved by using a base of copper, such as: Verdigris, (زنجار), using malachite, or by mixing other primary colours such as indigo blue and orpimente. Adding other pigments such as vermillion helped to add tonality to the colour.

== Types ==
Two types of works were illustrated; scientific books and literary manuscripts. Baghdad, Mosul and northern Syria were the main centers for the manufacturing of manuscripts, usually the origin of the works is often difficult to determine.

=== Scientific manuscripts (الْمَخْطُوطَات الْعِلْمِيَّة) ===
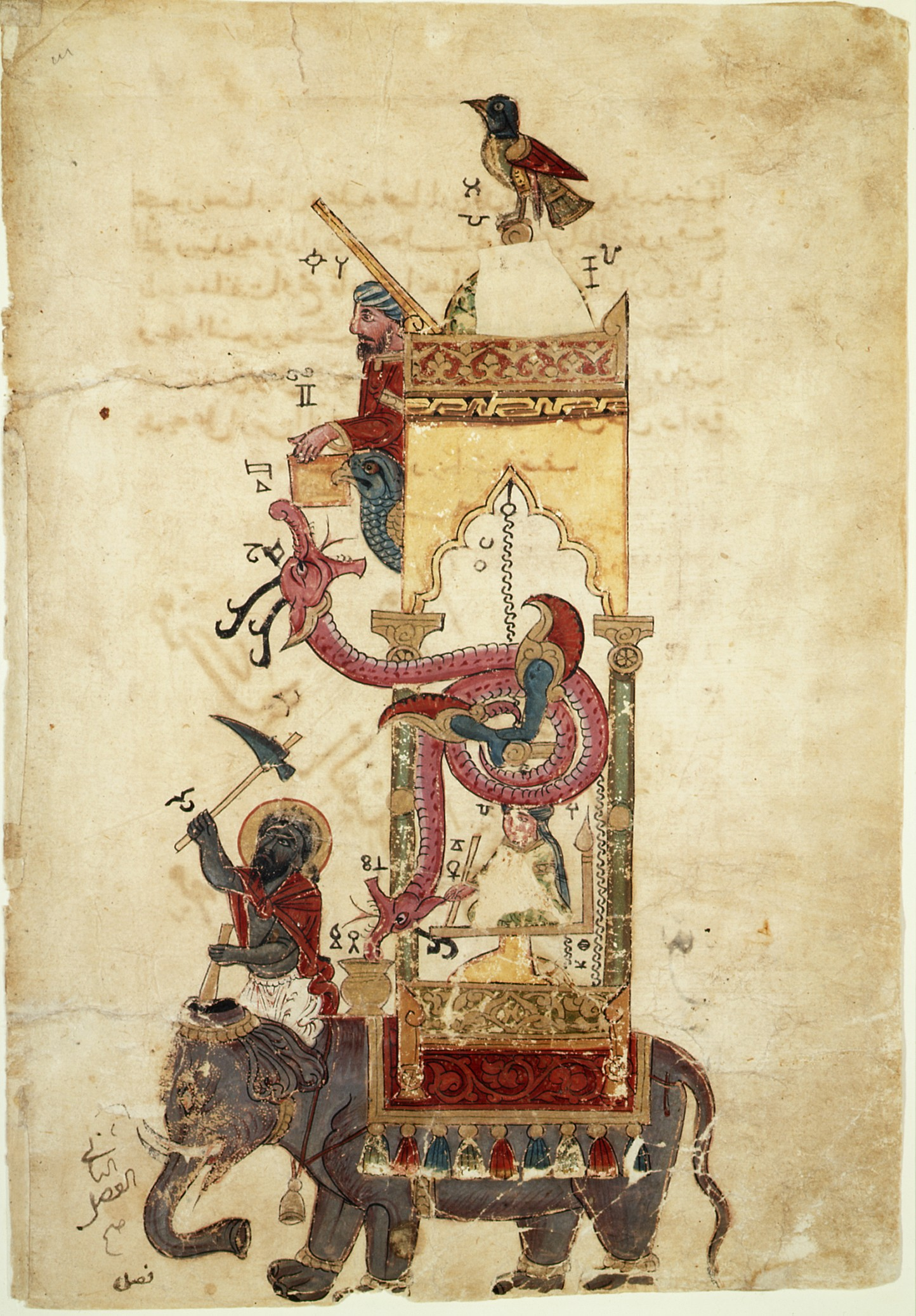
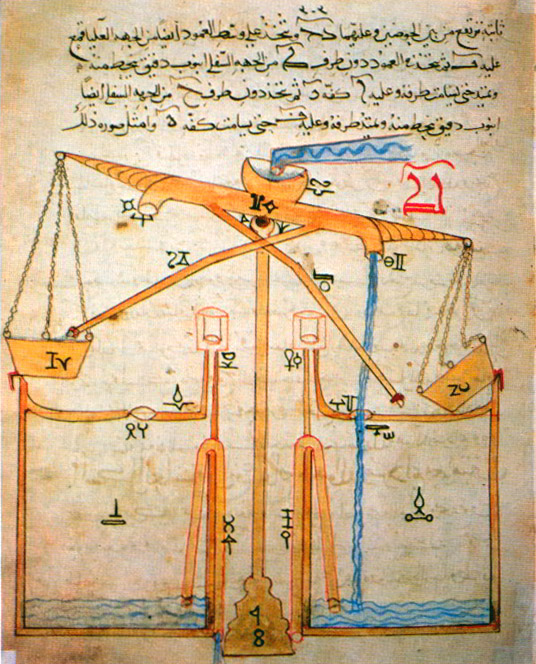
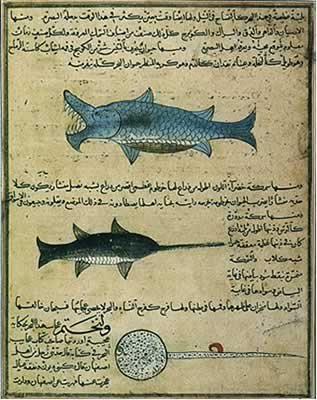
(From right to left) Al-Jazari elephant clock, water device and a page from a codex about zoology.

The main field in which illustrated manuscripts proliferated were scientific works. Usually bestiaries, veterinary medicine and particularly furūsiyya and hippiatry such as the Book of Veterinary Art by Ahmed Ibn Hussein. There are also books on pharmacopoeia or anti-poison, often drawn from the texts of ancient doctors. The Book of Theriac is the most famous example, inspired by Galen. Books on mechanics and automata used to be written, and in particular the most famous of them, The Book of Knowledge of Mechanical Tricks by Al-Jazari in 1206, Who was the engineer of the Artukid sultan Nasir ad-Din Mahmoud. Treatises on cosmogony or cosmography were also written.

=== Literary manuscripts (الْمَخْطُوطَات الْأَدَبِيَّة) ===
The Maqamat manuscripts provide an opportunity to employ an iconography directly inspired by daily life in the Arab towns of the time. Love stories are present in Arabic literature, but only two illustrated manuscripts are known, the most famous of which is Hadith Bayad wa Riyad. The other particularity of the manuscript is being one of the rare illustrated works produced in the Maghreb or Al-Andalus at that time.

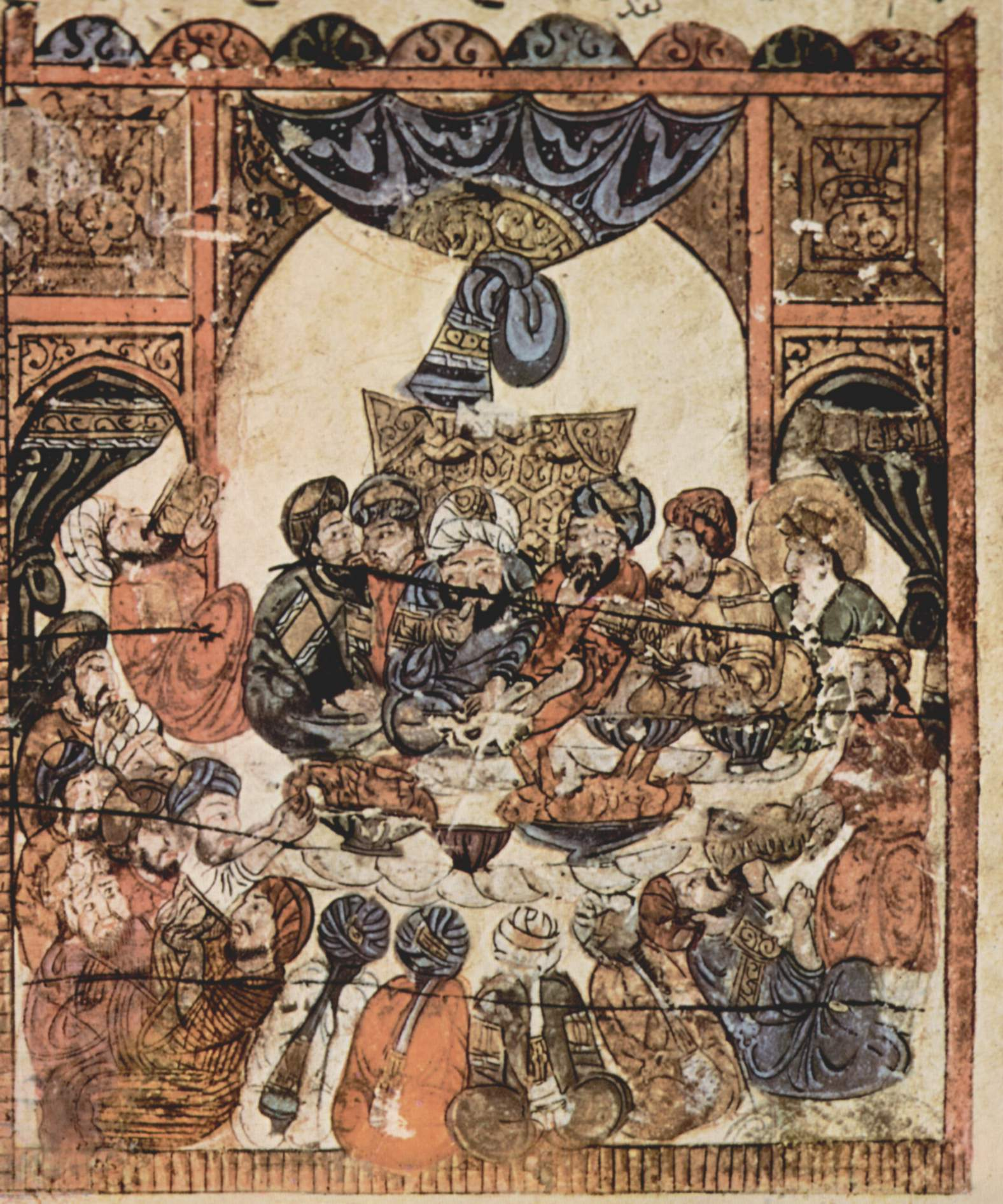
The Maqamat of Al-Hariri of Saint Petersburg.

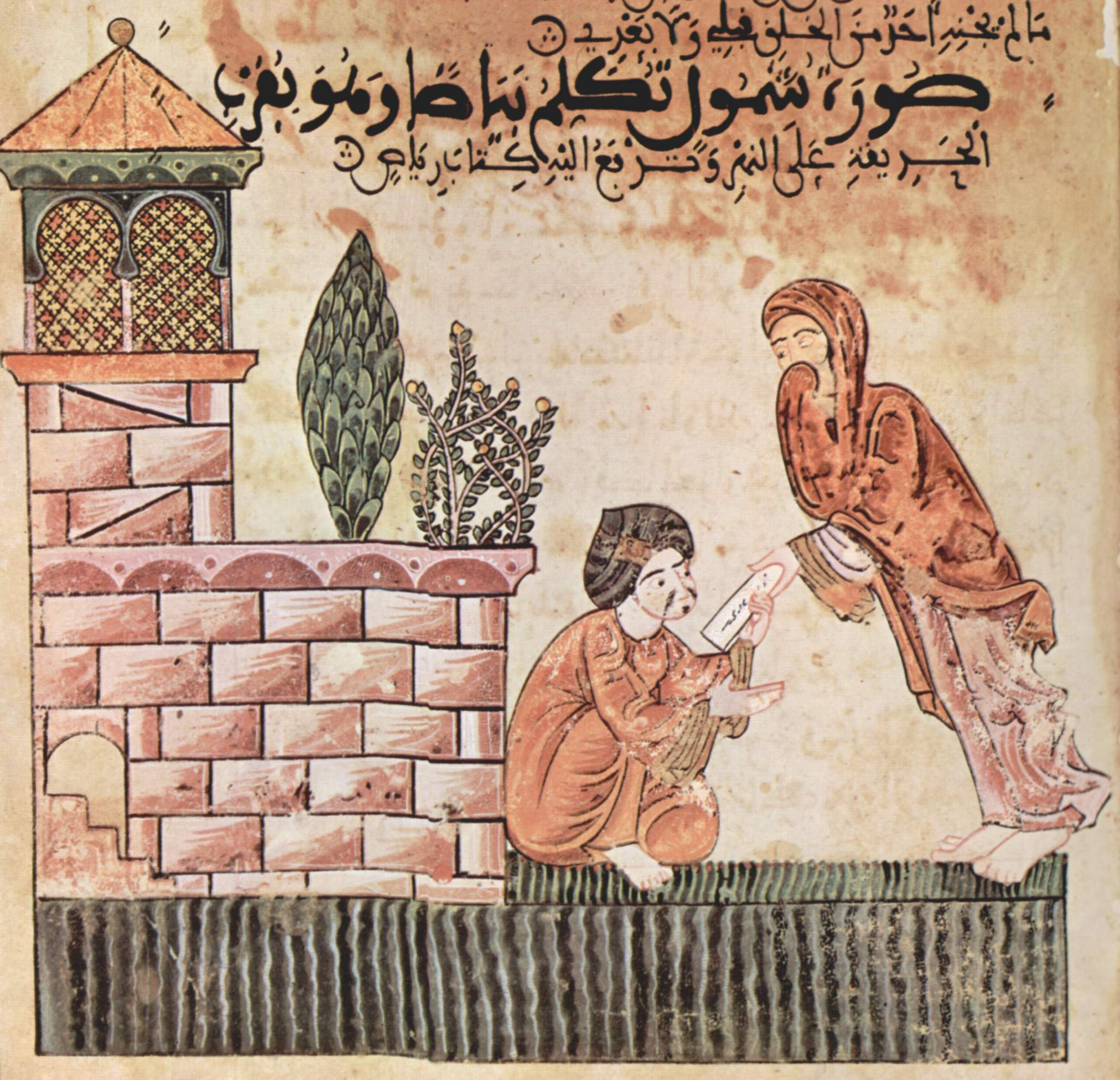
Hadith Bayad wa Riyad, Vatican Library

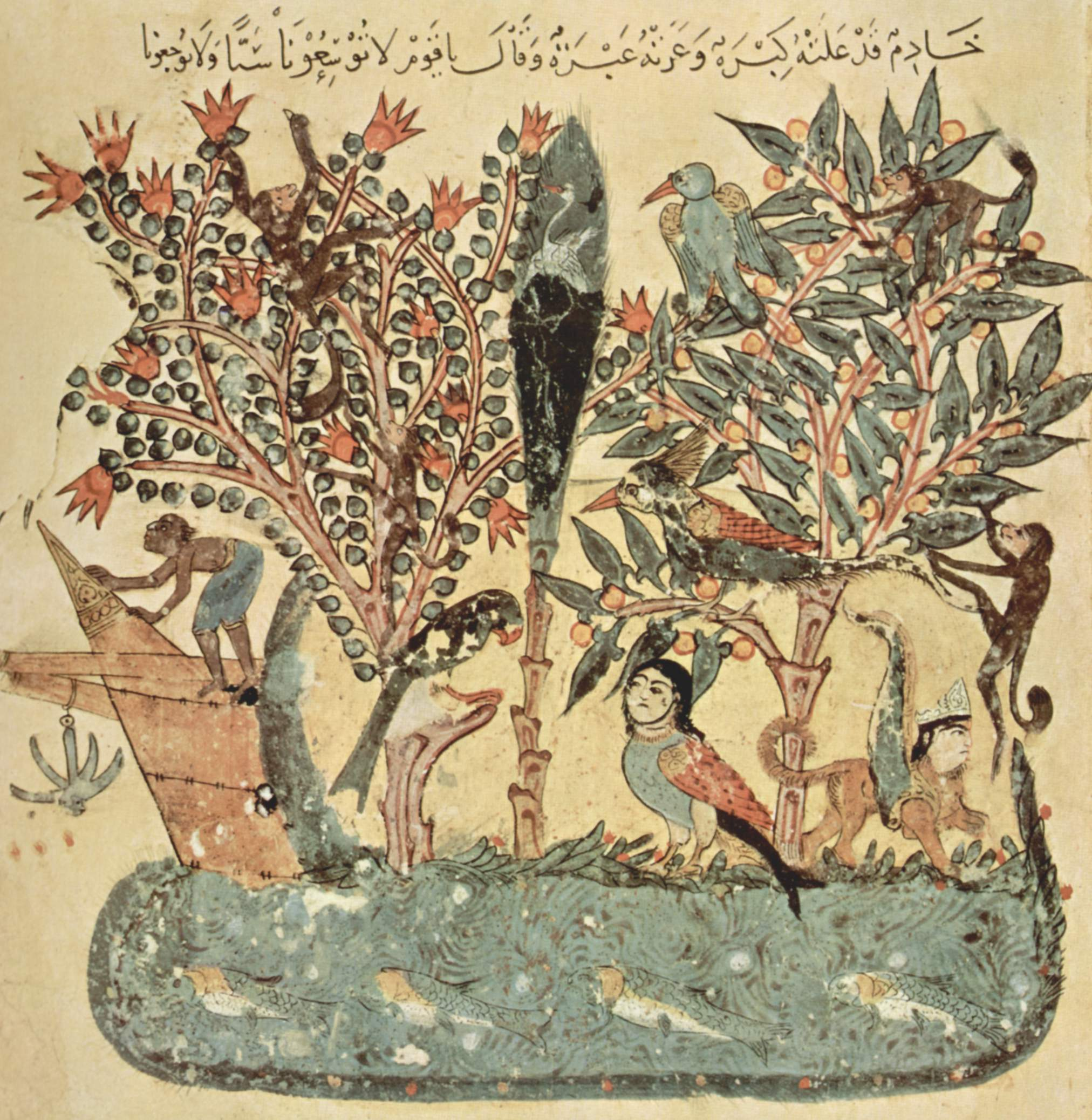
Yahya ibn Mahmud al-Wasiti

== Gallery ==
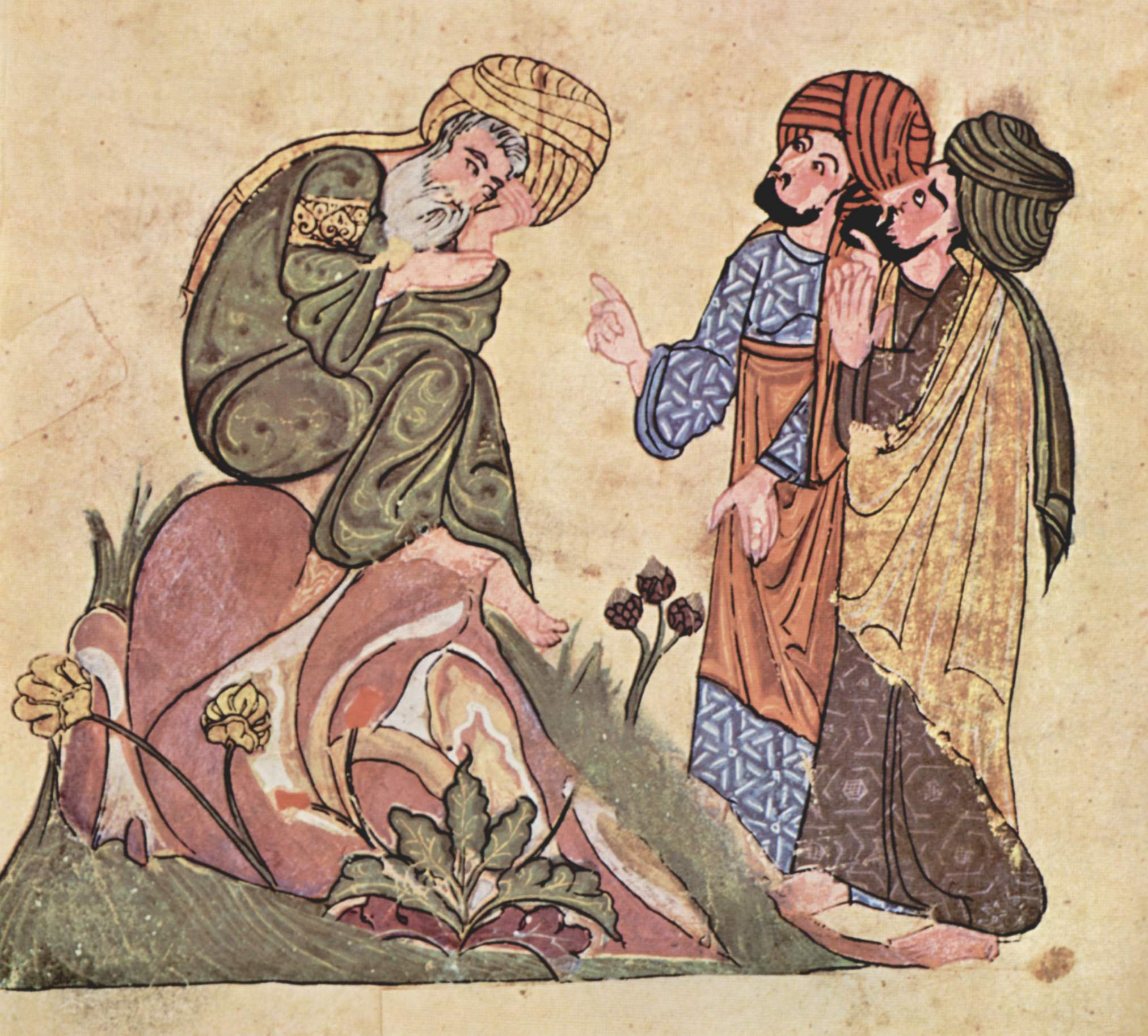
"Kitāb mukhtār al-ḥikam" by Al-Mubashshir ibn Fatik, 13th century manuscript.

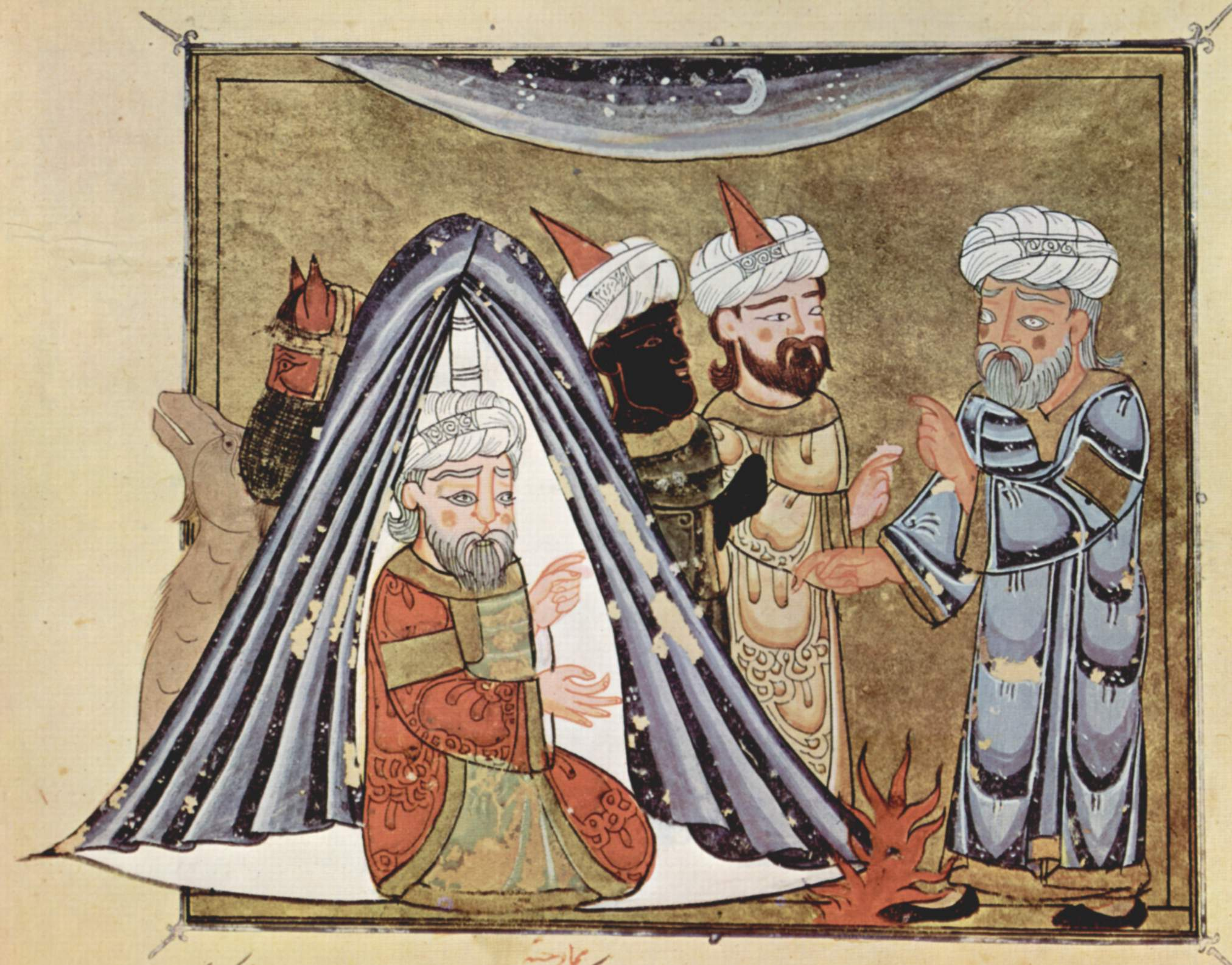
Arabic miniature featuring Al-Harith

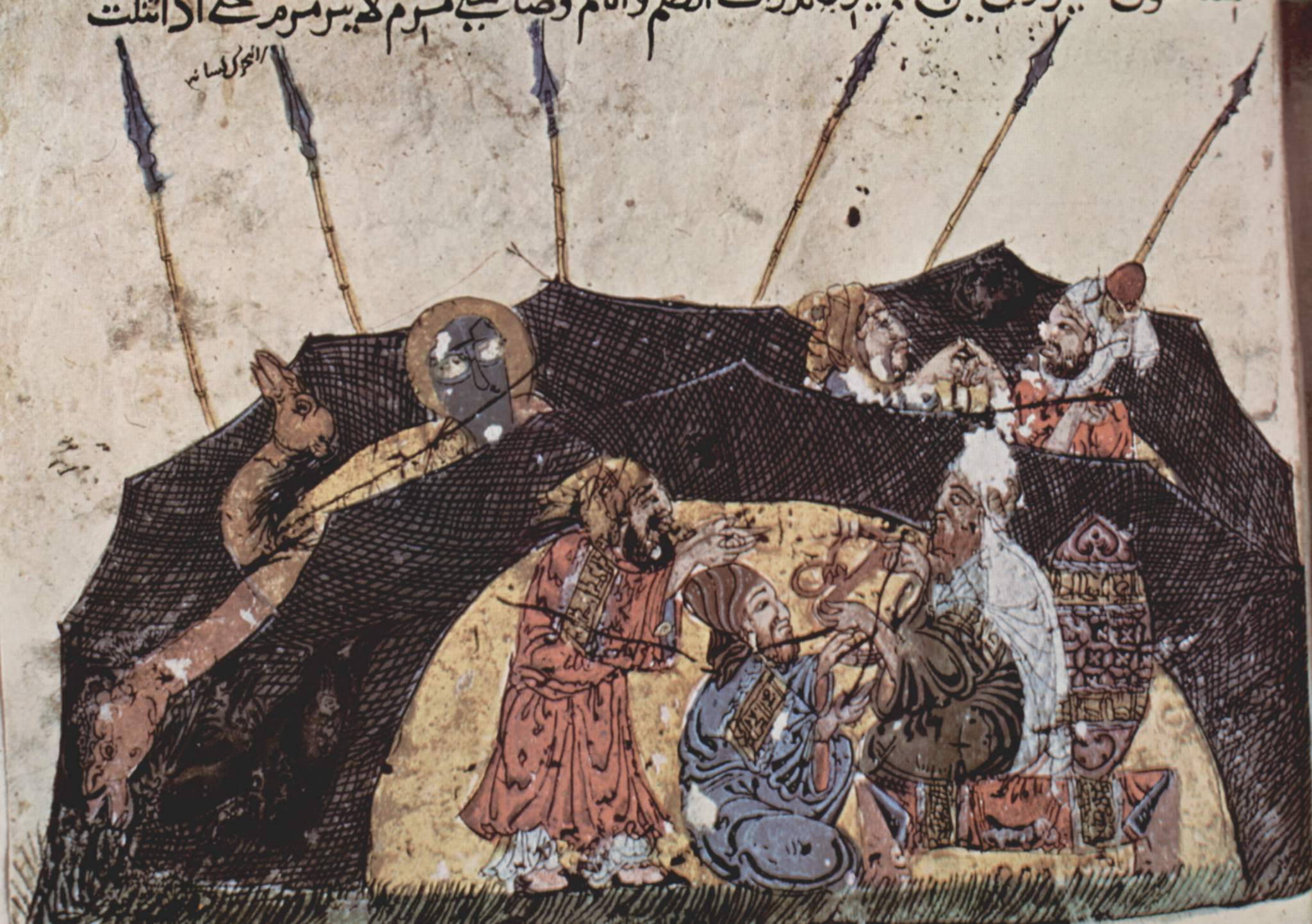
Maqamat of al-Hariri (43rd maqam), The Story of the Lost Traveler.

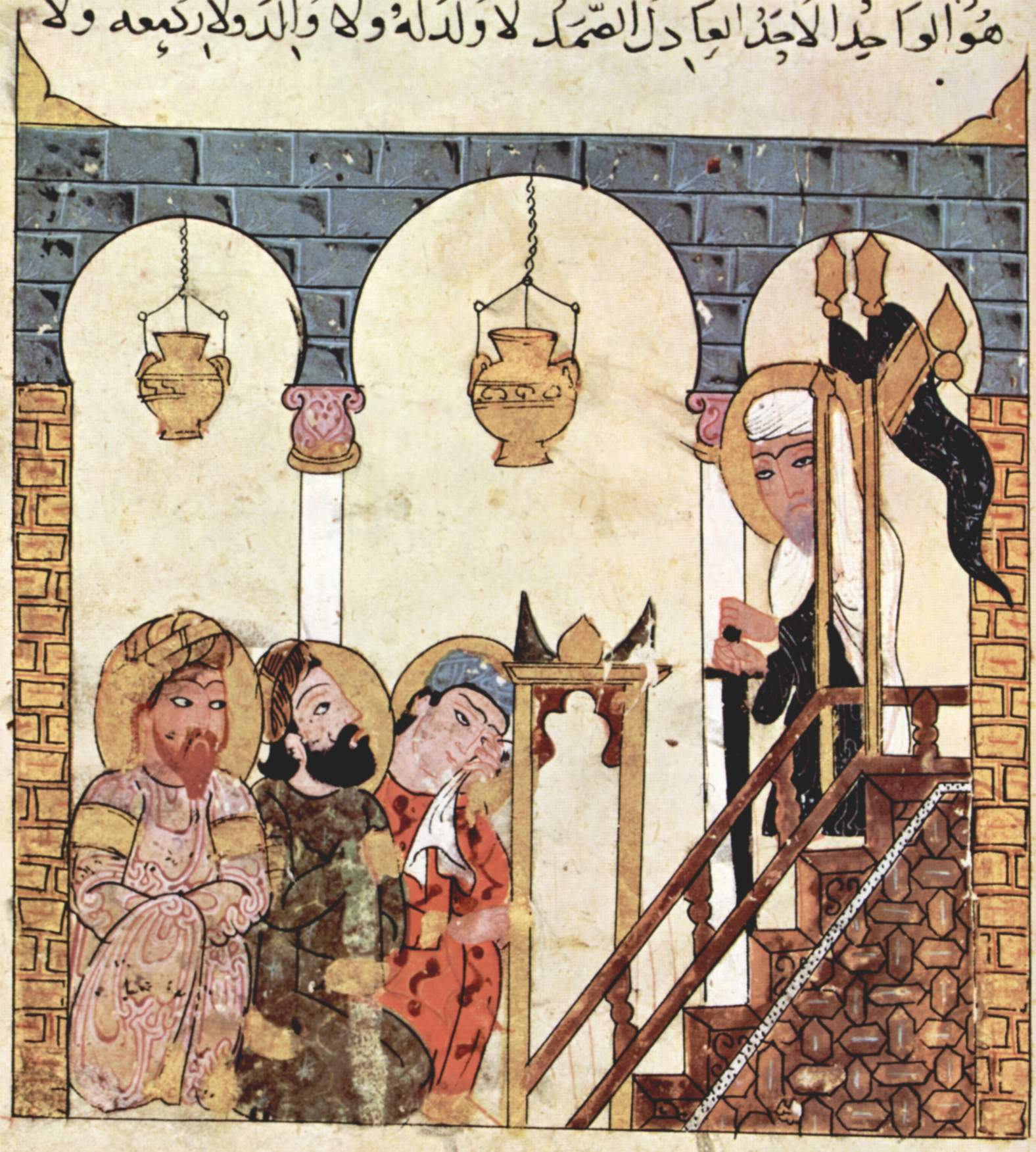
Abû Zayd preaches in the mosque of Samarkand, circa 1300. Maqamat of al-Hariri Syrian manuscript.

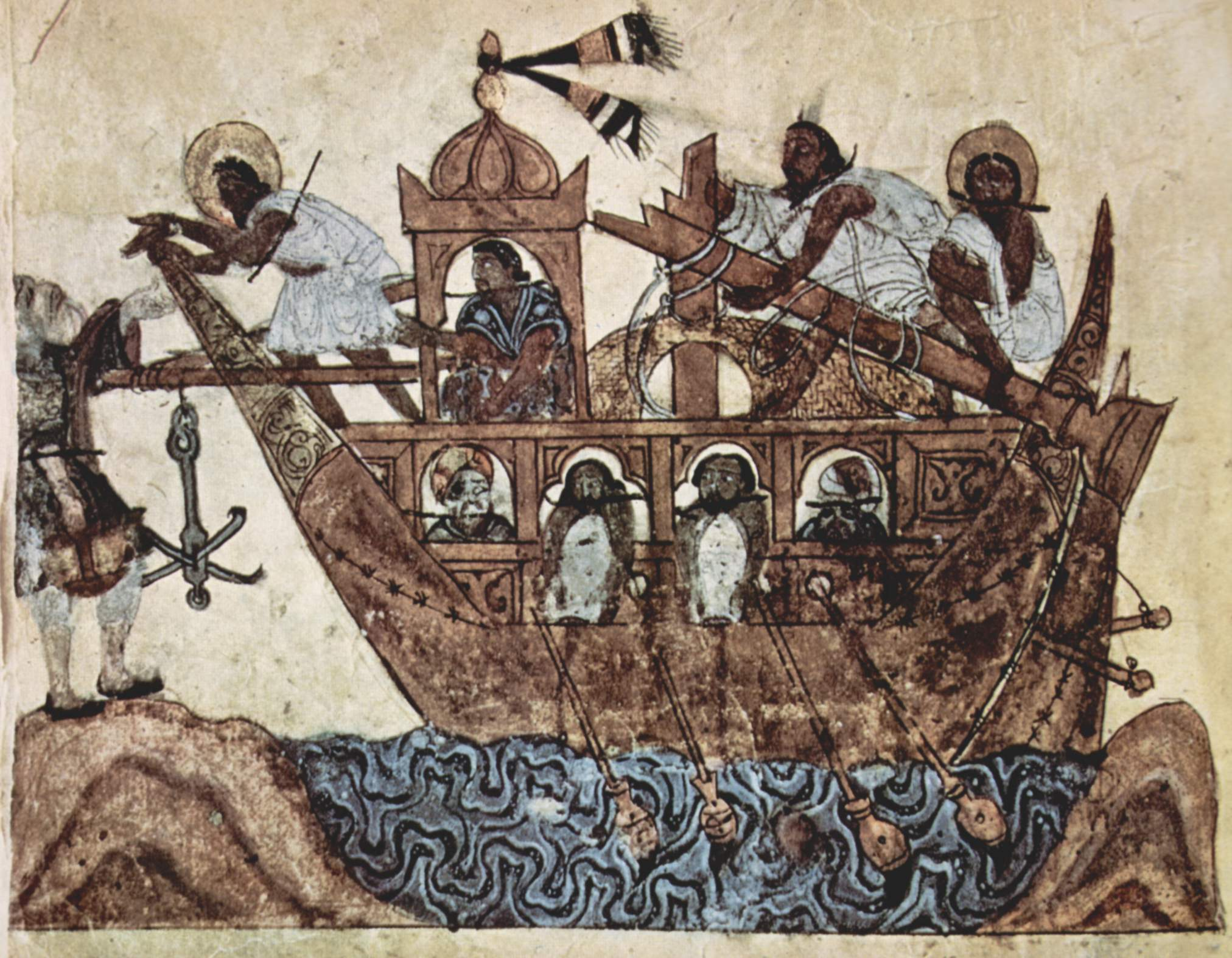
Arab dhow, c. 1230 AD, by an Iraqi painter.

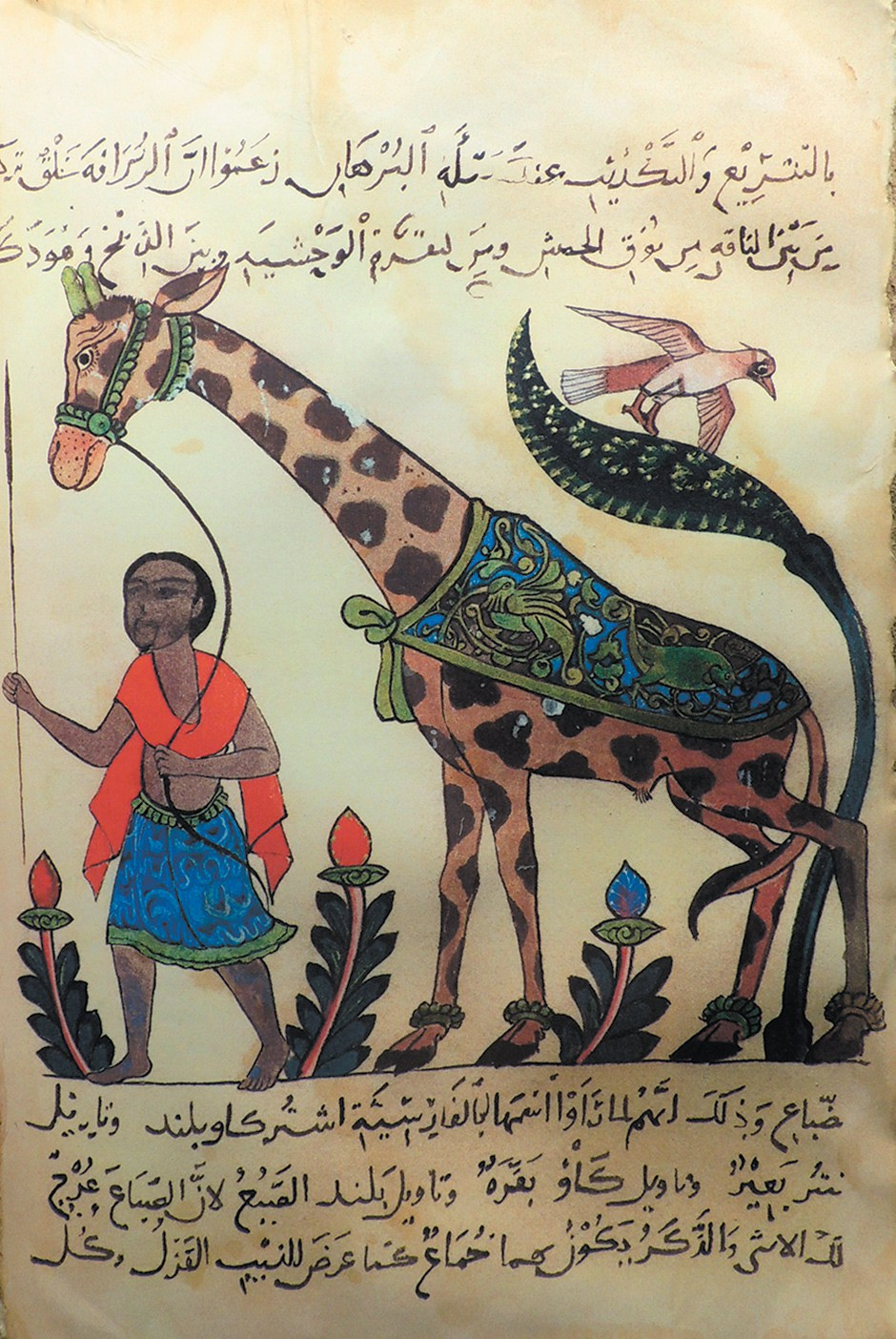
A giraffe from "Kitāb al-ḥayawān" (Book of the Animals) by Al-Jahiz.

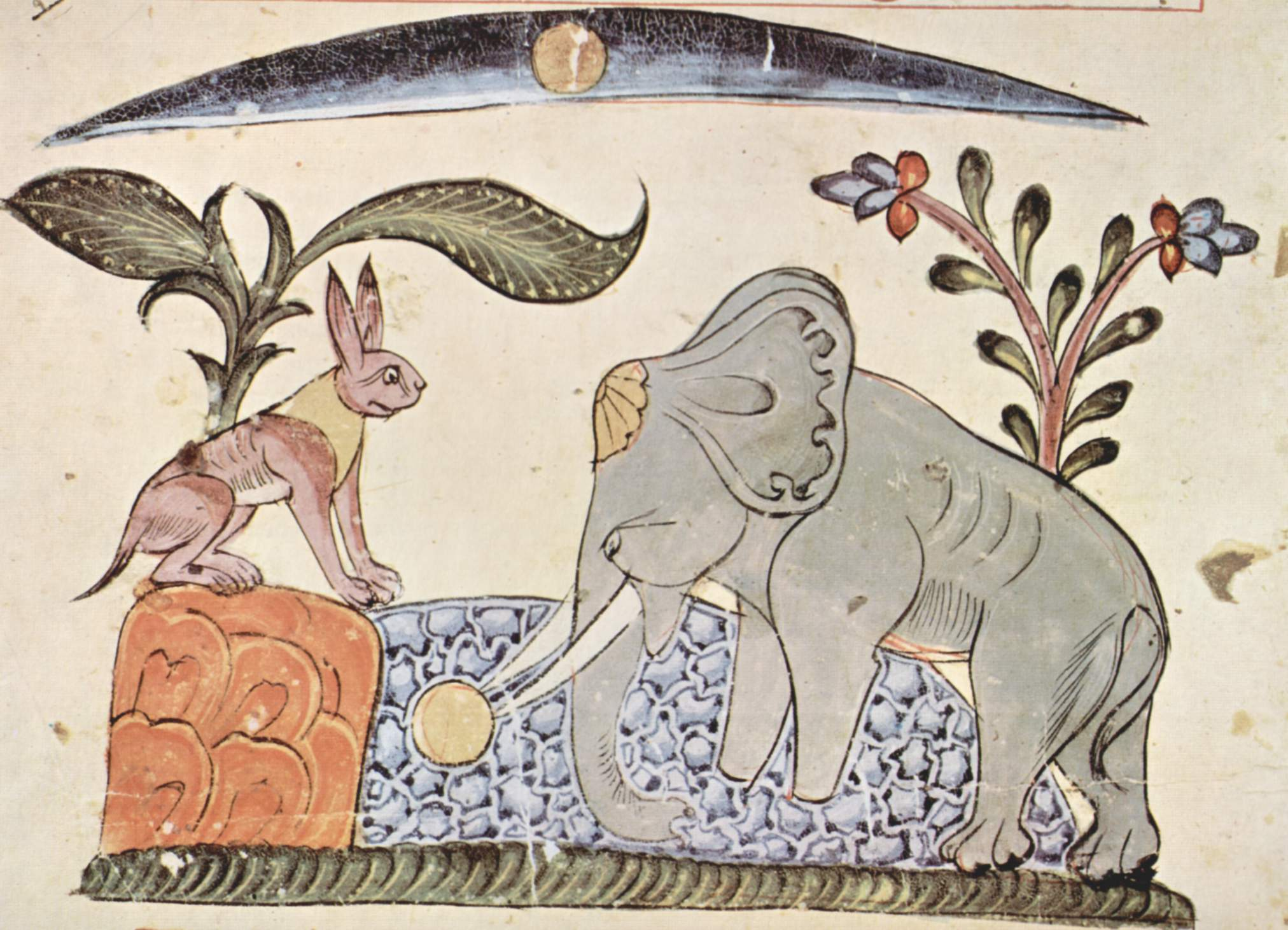
1310 Syrian illustration of "Kalila wa-Dimna".

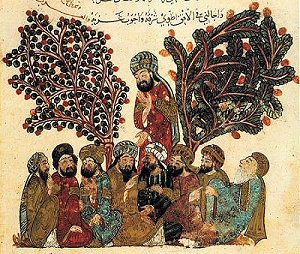
The Maqamat of Badi' al-Zaman al-Hamadani, 9th century.

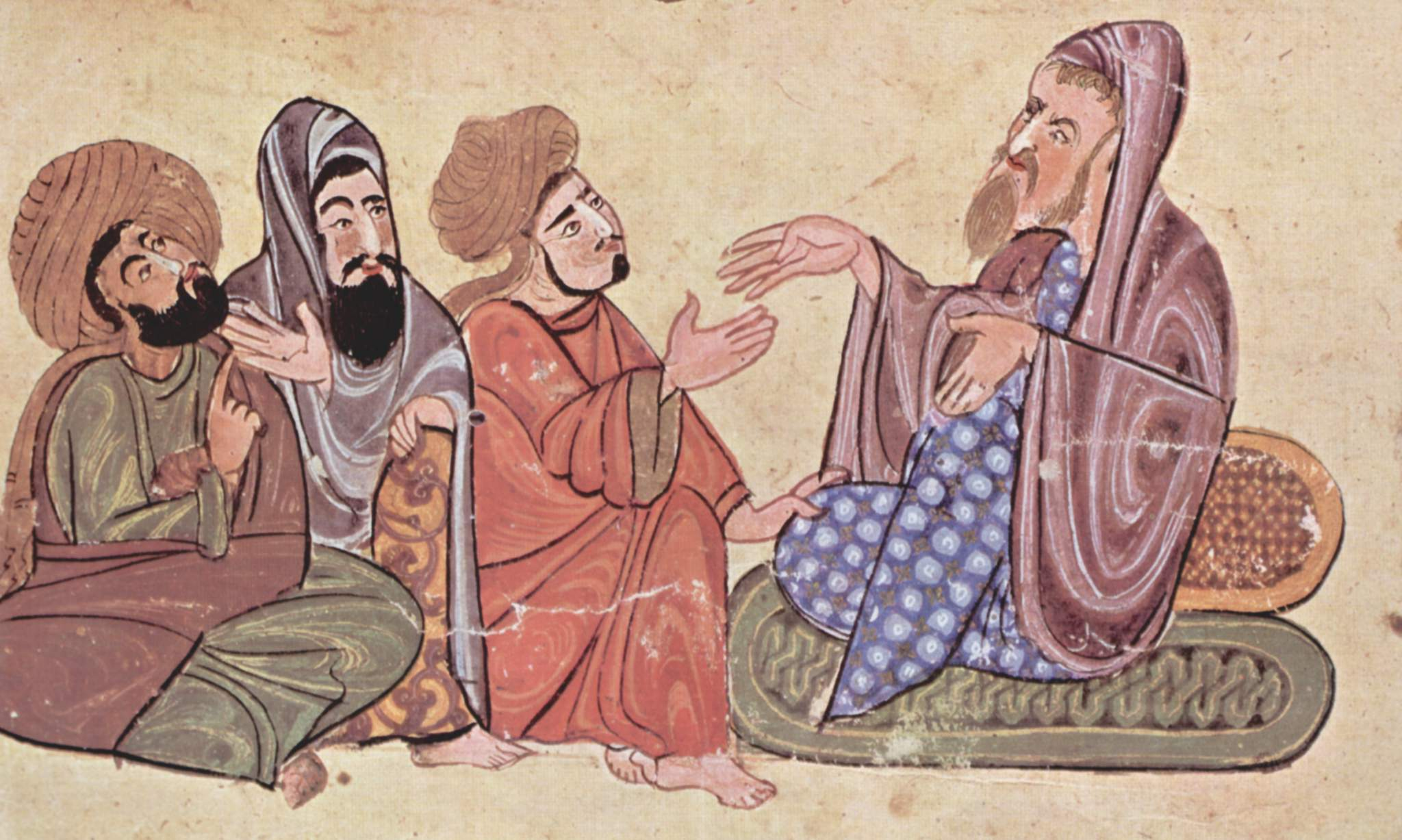
"Kitāb mukhtār al-ḥikam" by Al-Mubashshir ibn Fatik, Syrian manuscript circa 1250.

== See also ==
- Baghdad School
- Byzantine illuminated manuscripts
- Maqama
- Arab culture
- Arabic calligraphy
- Persian miniature
- Islamic Golden age
- Islamic art
- Islamic miniature
- History of the Arabs
