= Hamdani =

Hamdani or al-Hamdani (Arabic: حمداني ,همداني ,حامضاني, Urdu: حمدانی) may refer to:

== People with the surname ==
- Abu Firas al-Hamdani (932–968), Arab prince and poet
- Abu Muhammad al-Hasan al-Hamdani (893–945), Arab geographer, historian and astronomer
- Dorsaf Hamdani (born 1975), Tunisian singer and musicologist
- Fayçal Hamdani (born 1970), Algerian footballer
- Harith al-Hamdani (fl. 7th century), contemporary of Muhammad
- Michael John Hamdani, Pakistani Canadian who perpetrated a terrorism hoax in 2002
- Mir Sayyid Ali Hamadani (1314–1384), Persian Sufi Muslim Saint
- Mohammad Salman Hamdani (1977–2001), Pakistani American scientist and EMT killed in the 9/11 attacks
- Musalam Fayez Al Hamdani (born 1987), Emarati footballer
- Ra'ad al-Hamdani (born 1945), Iraqi general under Saddam Hussein
- Rachid Hamdani (born 1985), Moroccan footballer
- Saeed Ibn Qais Hamdani (fl. 654–670), Tabi‘un hermit
- Salah Al-Hamdani (born 1951), Iraqi poet, actor, and playwright
- Sayyad Laal Shah Hamdani (died 1896), Muslim scholar and Sufi shaykh
- Shaikh Ghulam Hamdani Mas'hafi (1751–1844), Indian Urdu poet
- Smail Hamdani (1930–2017), Algerian politician
- Talat Hamdani (born 1953), Pakistani American anti-discrimination activist and mother of Mohammad Salman Hamdani
- Yusuf Hamdani (1062–1141), Persian Sufi master

== Other ==
- Banu Hamdan (Arabic: همدان; Musnad: 𐩠𐩣𐩵𐩬), a Sabaean clan that dates back to the 1st millennium BCE
- Hamdani, Yemen, a village in Sana'a Governorate
- Hamdani, a strain of Arabian horse

== See also ==
- Hamadani (disambiguation)
- Hamadan (disambiguation)
- Hamdan, a given name and surname
- Hamdanid dynasty, Syria
- Hamdanids (Yemen)
