= Hamadani (surname) =

Hamdani, Hamadani, Hamedani or Hamadhani (Arabic: همذاني, Persian: همدانی) is a Persian attributive title (or also an Arabic nisbah) that denotes an origin from the Hamadan province of Iran.It is commonly used for Badi' al-Zaman al-Hamadani, but the many notable people with the surname include:

- Mihran-i Hamadani (died 633), Sasanian military officer
- Burayr ibn Khuzayr al-Hamadani (7th century), Qāriʾ, Tabi‘un, and companion of Ali
- Ibn al-Faqih al-Hamadhani (10th century), Persian historian and geographer
- Abd al-Jabbâr al-Hamadhânî (935–1025), Mu'tazilite theologian
- Baba Taher Oryan Hamadani (938–1021), Persian poet
- Badi' al-Zaman al-Hamadani (969–1007), Persian Arabic-language writer and poet
- Yusuf Hamadani (1062–1141), Persian Sufi master
- Ayn al-Quzat Hamadani (1098–1131), Persian judge, mystic, and philosopher
- Rashid-al-Din Hamadani (1247–1318), Persian statesman, historian and physician
- Mir Sayyid Ali Hamadani (1314–1384), Persian Sufi poet and scholar
- Elahi Hamadani (fl. 17th century), Iranian poet
- Moshfegh Hamadani (1914–2009), Jewish Iranian journalist and writer
- Yosef Hamadani Cohen (1916–2014), Iranian Chief Rabbi
- Hossein Noori Hamedani (born 1926), Iranian Twelver Shi'a Marja
- Hossein Hamadani (1951–2015), Iranian Revolutionary Guard commander
- Sattar Hamedani (born 1974), Iranian footballer

== See also ==
- Hamadani (disambiguation)
- Hamdani (disambiguation)
