= Hamadani =

Hamadani, Hamedani or Hamadhani denotes something or someone related to the town of Hamadan in Iran, and may refer to:

== Places ==
- Aghbolagh-e Hamadani, a village in Takab County, West Azerbaijan Province, Iran
- Tolombeh-ye Hamadani, a village in Rafsanjan County, Kerman Province, Iran
- Al-Hamadhani, a crater on planet Mercury

== People ==
- Hamadani, a surname that denotes an origin from Hamadan

== Other ==
- Judeo-Hamedani dialect, spoken by Iranian Jews
- Maqamat Badi' az-Zaman al-Hamadhani, a 9th-century Arabic collection of stories

== See also ==
- Hamdani (disambiguation)
- Hamadan (disambiguation)
