= 11′09″01 September 11 =

2002 anthology film by 11 directors

- French theatrical release poster
- Directed by: Youssef Chahine; Amos Gitaï; Shohei Imamura; Alejandro González Iñárritu; Claude Lelouch; Samira Makhmalbaf; Mira Nair; Idrissa Ouédraogo; Sean Penn; Danis Tanovic; Ken Loach
- Written by: Youssef Chahine; Alejandro González Iñárritu; Amos Gitaï; Marie-José Sanselme; Claude Lelouch; Pierre Uytterhoeven; Danis Tanovic; Idrissa Ouédraogo; Paul Laverty; Ken Loach; Vladimir Vega; Sabrina Dhawan; Samira Makhmalbaf; Sean Penn; Daisuke Tengan
- Produced by: Jacques Perrin; Nicolas Mauvernay
- Cinematography: Mohsen Nasr; Yoav Kosh; Pierre-William Glenn; Mustafa Mustafic; Luc Drion; Nigel Willoughby; Peter Hellmich; Jorge Müller Silva; Declan Quinn; Ebrahim Ghafouri; Samuel Bayer; Masakazu Oka; Toshihiro Seino
- Edited by: Rashida Abdel Salam; Kim Bica; Kobi Netanel; Stéphane Mazalaigue; Monique Rysselinck; Julia Grégory; Jonathan Morris; C. Allyson Johnson; Mohsen Makhmalbaf; Jay Cassidy; Hajime Okayasu
- Music by: Alexandre Desplat; Gustavo Santaolalla; Osvaldo Golijov; Salif Keita; Manu Dibango; Guem Percussion; Vladimir Vega; Ali Maula Ali; Mohamad Rezadarvishi; Heitor Pereira
- Production company: Galatee Films/StudioCanal
- Distributed by: BIM (Italy); Artificial Eye (United Kingdom); BAC Films (France); Tohokushinsha Film Corporation (Japan); Alfa Films (Latin America); Empire Pictures Inc. (United States)
- Release dates: September 5, 2002 (Italy); September 11, 2002 (Canada); September 11, 2002 (France); December 27, 2002 (United Kingdom); July 18, 2003 (United States)
- Running time: 135 minutes
- Countries: France; United Kingdom; Iran; Egypt; Bosnia and Herzegovina; Burkina Faso; Mexico; Israel; India; United States; Japan
- Languages: French; Persian; French Sign Language; Arabic; Serbo-Croatian; Mooré; English; Spanish; Hebrew; Japanese

11′09″01 September 11 (French: 11 minutes 9 secondes 1 image) is a 2002 international anthology film. It comprises 11 short films from 11 filmmakers, each from a different country, offering differing perspectives on the 9/11 terrorist attacks on the Twin Towers in New York City in 2001. The original concept and production of the film was by French producer Alain Brigand. The film has been released internationally with several titles. The filmmakers included Ken Loach, Claude Lelouch, Danis Tanović, Youssef Chahine, Samira Makhmalbaf, and Sean Penn.

== Synopsis ==
=== Overview ===
The film consists of 11 segments directed by 11 filmmakers from 11 countries, each expressing a unique perspective on the tragedy of September 11, 2001. Each segment lasts 11 minutes, 9 seconds, and 1 frame (11′09″01). Each gave their own vision of the events in New York City during the September 11 attacks, in a short film of 11 minutes, 9 seconds, and one frame.

=== "Iran" ===
- Directed by Samira Makhmalbaf

The news of the September 11, 2001 attacks reaches an Afghan refugee camp, where bricks are produced to build new shelters, in view of the attacks promised by the United States. Here a young teacher tries to explain to her young students what happened and to make them observe a minute of silence in honor of the victims. Attempts, however, fail one after another. Finally, the teacher finds herself having to impose the minute of silence on the children near a chimney (the structure most similar to a skyscraper in the area).

=== "France" ===
- Directed by Claude Lelouch

New York, September 11, 2001: a young French photographer deaf-mute is a guest of her fiancé, a tour guide for disabled people who is about to bring a group to visit the Twin Towers. After she tried to explain to him that a story "at a distance" like theirs has no chance of succeeding, he tries to leave a message on the computer before leaving explaining that only a miracle can keep them together. At that moment he returns home covered in dust, miraculously escaping the attack.

=== "Egypt" ===
- Directed by Youssef Chahine

New York, September 10, 2001: director Yusuf Shahin is finalizing the filming of a film at the World Trade Center, but is sent away with his crew in a decisive manner by a policeman because he has no authorization to stay there. Two days later, Shahin presented himself at a press conference, but said he was upset by the attacks and asked to be able to postpone it, triggering the reaction of a journalist.

While he is on the cliff in front of the house, the ghost of a young American soldier appears to him, who died in the attack on multinational forces in Lebanon in 1983. The soldier reveals to Shahin that he is the only one who can see him, because he is the only one who can hear and understand what is going on around. The two face a "journey" that leads them to analyze the roots of the clash between the United States and the Arab world, starting from the house of the young Arab who was the executor material of the attack. After observing his preparation, Shahin discusses with his parents, who say they are proud of what he has done and go on to complain of the constant violence suffered by the Palestinians by Israel.

The soldier reacts by saying that, although he understands the attacks against the soldiers, it is still not right to shoot in the pile. The director counters by showing the list of victims of US military interventions and wars after the Second World War, not justifying the violence but complaining about the United States' inability to understand that the legitimate defense of their principles often goes through the destruction of other countries. Their path ends at Arlington National Cemetery, where Shahin finds his girlfriend and the young soldier's father, who turns out to be the policeman who drove him away from the Twin Towers and with whom he reconciles. Shortly thereafter, the phantom of the attacker appears, who resolutely reproaches the director for appearing too good with that soldier. Shahin replies that both are victims of human stupidity, but the attacker responds by reiterating his position once again and showing he does not want to understand, leaving the director stunned by his uncompromising words.

=== "Bosnia-Herzegovina" ===
- Directed by Danis Tanović

Despite the attacks in New York, a girl from Srebrenica considers it appropriate to celebrate the monthly demonstration anyway, in memory of the massacre of the local population by Bosnian Serb soldiers, which took place on July 11, 1995.

=== "Burkina Faso" ===
- Directed by Idrissa Ouédraogo

Ouagadougou, September 2001: Adamà is a boy who is forced to leave school and work as a newsboy in order to be able to pay for medicines to his sick mother. Two weeks after the attacks, Adamà sees a man very similar to Osama bin Laden and decides to capture him with the help of his friends, in order to claim the prize of 25 million pending on his boss. The boys decide to use that money to treat Adamà's mother and, potentially, many other sick people in the country, as well as not to say anything to the adults, to prevent them from wasting the money of the prize.

The boys steal the camera of one of their parents and start to follow "Osama bin Laden" to a clearing where, every day, he goes to pray. The five therefore devise a plan to capture him in that clearing, but "bin Laden" does not show up that day. The boys try to capture him at the hotel, but they discover that the man is now going to the airport, where they are stopped by the policeman before they could enter. In the end, the boys decide to sell the camera and give Adamà the money, so he can look after his mother and go back to school.

=== "United Kingdom" ===
- Directed by Ken Loach

Pablo, a Chilean refugee in London, writes a letter to the families of the victims of the September 11 attacks, reminding them of "his" September 11: Chilean coup of 1973, when the general Augusto Pinochet implemented a coup d'état (backed by the US) against left-wing president Salvador Allende, democratically elected in 1970. Pablo narrates in his letter of US involvement in financing of right-wing and subversive groups, up to the coup, and of the violence and torture suffered by him and his countrymen. Forced to first five years in prison and then into exile, he declares that he can no longer return to Chile because his family and children are now born and raised in the United Kingdom. Pablo concludes his letter with the hope that, as he will unite in the memory of the victims of September 11, 2001, so they will join him in memory of the victims of September 11, 1973.

=== "Mexico" ===
- Directed by Alejandro González Iñárritu

Black screen. Background noises and rumors of everyday life, suddenly interrupted by the screams of the witnesses of the crash of flight AA11 against the North Tower of the World Trade Center. While the black screen is occasionally interrupted by the repertoire images of the attacks, the voices of the announcements on television, the screams of the victims, the explosions of the planes, the calls made by the victims and their relatives overlap. The sound stops and you can see the two towers collapse without sound. The background voices start again on a background of violins, while the screen gradually changes from black to white. Two writings appear (one in Arabic characters and one in Latin characters) of the same meaning: "Does God's light guide us or blind us?" The sentences finally disappear in a blinding light.

=== "Israel" ===
- Directed by Amos Gitai

A suicide attack shakes Tel Aviv. Soldiers, policemen and doctors for various, long minutes try to coordinate the operations of security and rescue. A journalist and her crew arrive at the scene and try in every way to obtain information from the police forces present, obtaining only peremptory invitations to clear the area. At one point, the director tells the journalist that she won't go on the air and she reacts first by protesting, then starting to rattle off various historical events that took place all on September 11. While the journalist insists on carrying out her service, the voice of the director is heard in the background telling her that something very serious happened in New York, to the point of explicitly saying "remember this date, September 11th, because it is a date that nobody more will forget ". Faced with the further (but now unintelligible) protests of the journalist, the director replies "I'm not talking to you about September 11th of '44 or '97, I'm talking about September 11th today".

=== "India" ===
- Directed by Mira Nair

Nair chose a true story for her narrative film, that of a 23-year-old research assistant from the Bayside, Queens, neighbourhood, Mohammad Salman Hamdani. His parents at first thought that he was one of around 1,000 Muslims detained for security reasons after the attack. The New York Post published a photograph of him, implying that he was guilty of collaboration and treason. His family, including his mother, Talat Hamdani protested to their congressman, and even to President Bush. Six months later, Salman's remains were found at the site of the ruins. It emerged that he had rushed to save lives, and was finally given the hero's burial he deserved.

In the film, CIA and FBI repeatedly question Salman's mother, since they believe he could be linked to the attacks. In particular, they ask many questions about why he did not show up for work that day and why, despite having decided to pursue a medical career and leave the police academy, he still held the police academy card. While she does not resign herself to the disappearance of her son, the media begin to report the news of her involvement in the attack, which does nothing but exacerbate the isolation in which the woman and the family have fallen. Only after six months, the boy's remains are identified among those found among the rubble and the truth is re-established: it turns out that the young man died while he was helping at the site of the attacks. During the funeral, the mother denounces the climate of suspicion that has been created against her family and against the Muslim community in the United States.

=== "United States of America" ===
- Directed by Sean Penn

An old man spends his life alone in an apartment overshadowed by the Twin Towers. The widowed man vents his loneliness by talking to his late wife as if she were still alive and cultivating her flower pot, withered by the lack of light. The collapse of the Towers finally allows the light to flood the apartment and suddenly revitalizes the flowers. The elder, happy for what happened, tries to show the vase to his wife, but the light reveals the illusion in which he lived until then. Between tears, he regrets that his wife is not there to finally see the vase bloom again.

=== "Japan" ===
- Directed by Shōhei Imamura

Japan, August 1945. Yoichi, a soldier returned from the front with post-traumatic disorder, behaves like a snake, to the dismay of his parents and his wife. His family tries to convince him to return to the "human" state, but without success. The other villagers begin to look at them with suspicion and fear, but this does not prevent Yoichi's wife from having an extra-marital relationship.

While the wife and her lover talk about the traumatic experiences that the soldier must have suffered, of the new type of bomb used in the bombing of Hiroshima and the forthcoming end of the war, the situation worsens: Yoichi swallows a mouse under the horrified eyes of his mother, who decides to chase him away. In the following days, the villagers suffer the loss of various animals and everyone blames the mad soldier. It is thus decided to organize a search operation to find it, but without success. Meanwhile, a flashback clarifies the reason for the soldier's behavior: hiding behind a boulder after a violent battle, Yoichi is beaten by a fellow soldier who asks him why he does not take part in this "holy war".

During the hunt, Yoichi's wife accidentally finds her husband drinking water from a river and asks him "do you dislike being a man so much?" Yoichi, in response, crawls into the water and swims away ignoring the screams of his wife. Finally, a snake is shown above a river stone, while the inscription in Japanese "Holy wars do not exist" appears.

== Production ==
The original concept and production of the film was by French producer Alain Brigand, who acted as artistic producer for the film.

Jacques Perrin and Nicolas Mauvernay were producers of the complete 11′09″01 September 11.

Other crew included:

=== Producers ===
- Tania Zazulinsky (segment "France")
- Gabriel Khoury (segment "Egypt")
- Marianne Khoury (segment "Egypt")
- Čedomir Kolar (segment "Bosnia-Herzegovina")
- Nicolas Cand (segment "Burkina Faso")
- Rebecca O'Brien (segment "United Kingdom")
- Alejandro González Iñárritu (segment "Mexico")
- Gustavo Santaolalla (segment "Mexico")
- Laurent Truchot (segment "Israel")
- Lydia Dean Pilcher (segment "India")
- Jon C. Scheide (segment "United States of America")
- Catherine Dussart (segment "Japan")
- Nobuyuki Kajikawa (segment "Japan")
- Masamichi Sawada (segment "Japan")
- Masato Shinada (segment "Japan")

=== Writers ===
- Youssef Chahine (segment "Egypt")
- Sabrina Dhawan (segment "India")
- Amos Gitaï (segment "Israel")
- Alejandro González Iñárritu (segment "Mexico")
- Paul Laverty (segment "United Kingdom")
- Claude Lelouch (segment "France")
- Ken Loach (segment "United Kingdom")
- Samira Makhmalbaf (segment "Iran")
- Idrissa Ouedraogo (segment "Burkina Faso")
- Sean Penn (segment "United States of America")
- Marie José Sanselme (segment "Israel")
- Danis Tanović (segment "Bosnia-Herzegovina")
- Daisuke Tengan (segment "Japan")
- Pierre Uytterhoeven (segment "France")
- Vladimir Vega (segment "United Kingdom")

=== Music ===
- Michael Brook (segment "United States of America")
- Mohammad-Reza Darvishi (segment "Iran")
- Alexandre Desplat (title music)
- Manu Dibango (segment "Burkina Faso")
- Osvaldo Golijov (segment "Mexico")
- Tarō Iwashiro (segment "Japan")
- Salif Keita (segment "Burkina Faso")
- Heitor Pereira (segment "United States of America")
- Gustavo Santaolalla (segment "Mexico")
- Vladimir Vega (segment "United Kingdom")

=== Cinematography ===
- Samuel Bayer (segment "United States of America")
- Luc Drion (segment "Burkina Faso")
- Ebrahim Ghafori (segment "Iran")
- Pierre-William Glenn (segment "France")
- Peter Hellmich (segment "United Kingdom")
- Yoav Kosh (segment "Israel")
- Mustafa Mustafić (segment "Bosnia-Herzegovina")
- Mohsen Nasr (segment "Egypt")
- Masakazu Oka (segment "Japan")
- Declan Quinn (segment "India")
- Toshihiro Seino (segment "Japan")
- Jorge Müller Silva (segment "United Kingdom")
- Nigel Willoughby (segment "United Kingdom")

=== Editing ===
- Rashida Abdel Salam (segment "Egypt")
- Kim Bica (segment "Mexico")
- Jay Cassidy (segment "United States of America")
- Robert Duffy (segment "Mexico")
- Alejandro González Iñárritu (segment "Mexico")
- Julia Gregory (segment "Burkina-Faso")
- Allyson C. Johnson (segment "India")
- Mohsen Makhmalbaf (segment "Iran")
- Stéphane Mazalaigue (segment "France")
- Jonathan Morris (segment "United Kingdom")
- Kobi Netanel (segment "Israel")
- Hajime Okayasu (segment "Japan")
- Monique Rysselinck (segment "Bosnia-Herzegovina")

== Release ==
The film has been released internationally with several titles, depending on the language. It is listed in the Internet Movie Database as 11′09″01 - September 11, while in French, it is known as 11 minutes 9 secondes 1 image and in Persian as 11-e-Septambr.

It had its world premiere on September 5, 2002 at the Venice Film Festival in Italy. It was also screened at Toronto International Film Festival.

The premiere screening in the US was for an audience of graduate students in the Roone Arledge Auditorium at Columbia University in New York on 24 November 2002, partly due to Mira Nair's links with Columbia's film division. As of December 2002, 11′09″01 had been distributed in 20 countries, but not in the US, where, according to American theatre critic John Lahr, "a few of its segments are perceived, in some quarters, as anti-American. Loach's film, for instance, reminded audiences that on September 11, 1973, America helped bring about the downfall of Chile's democratically elected Socialist leader, Salvador Allende, and installed General Augusto Pinochet". It premiered in the US in summer 2003.

It was released on DVD in the UK by Artificial Eye in 2002, and on October 26, 2004 in the US.

== Reception ==
Deborah Young, writing in Variety magazine after the Venice Film Festival premiere, called the film "a sober, thought-provoking response to a tragedy of worldwide import and a much better film than one might expect from the pre-release publicity". She comments "Although at least two segments voice criticisms of American foreign policy, reports that the film is anti-American in focus are greatly exaggerated". At a press conference for the film at the festival, a journalist mentions the Variety review referring to some labelling the film "anti-American". Various directors defend the film: Danis Tanović responded that this was never his intention; Samira Makhmalbaf said "there are enough contrasts and conflicts on earth without film directors having to increase them". Claude Lelouch said that his use of a deaf mute came from wanting to use silence. Amos Gitai talked about the form of the film, saying that each there was a wide variety of approaches used by the filmmakers.

Sarah Colemen, writing for Salon after the film's US premiere at Columbia University, wrote "it is patchy, sometimes brilliant, occasionally laughable and much too long... In the end, though, the most provocative thing about this film might be that it wrests the narrative of Sept. 11 away from Americans and puts it in the hands of other, far-flung observers — the implication being that the historical event belongs, in some senses, to everyone". She concludes that, although "far from a masterpiece... it's a film Americans should see".

Phillip French, writing in The Observer in December 2002, thought that the film "adds up to much less than the sum of its parts", but especially praised Samira Makhmalbaf's segment, noting that the Iranian director was the youngest of all of the filmmakers involved.

Stephen Schaefer, writing in the Boston Herald in September 2003, gives the film 3 out of 4 stars. He refers to questions that other critics have raised: "Anti-American? Arrogant? Offensive?", and in general thinks the segments uneven in quality. He liked Mira Nair's film, but reserves highest praise for Idrissa Ouédraogo's and Inarritu's contributions.

In a feature article by Australian writer Christos Tsiolkas in the online film journal Senses of Cinema in January 2003, he refers to a "rather belligerent" review by Peter Matthews in Sight and Sound earlier that month, in which he stated that the film "virtually defines bad faith". Tsolkias disagrees, writing "11’09”01 probably fails miserably to do justice to the full implications of the bombings and subsequent declarations of war, but it is at least an attempt towards dialogue, and in canvassing responses from filmmakers across four continents, it counters the aggressiveness of Western media distillations of the event". Tsolkias thought that Samira Makhmalbaf's Blackboards was "one of the best allegories of war I had ever seen", and Youssef Chahine's film "fucking great", and also praises Ken Loach's film, which "[makes] the crucial link between compassion, understanding and history".

Ella Ruth Anaya, assistant professor of Cross-Cultural and Leadership Communication in the School of Media, Art and Culture at Trinity Western University in Canada, reviewing the DVD version of the film in 2011, wrote that the film "[had] been described as daring, artful, illuminating, intensely moving, and provocative". In her opinion, "The brilliance of this film is its scope and profundity".

As of 2025 the film has a rating of 77% on review aggregator Rotten Tomatoes.

== Accolades ==
At the 2002 Venice Film Festival, the film received the UNESCO Award and Ken Loach's segment was the winner of the FIPRESCI Prize for Best Short Film.
