= Hamadan (disambiguation) =

Hamadan is a city in Hamedan Province, Iran.

== Places ==
Hamedan (Persian: همدان) may also refer to:

- Hamadan, East Azerbaijan
- Hamedan, Sistan and Baluchestan or Humadan
- Hamedan Province, Iran
  - Hamadan County in Hamadan Province in Iran
  - Hamadan Airbase, an Islamic Republic of Iran Air Force base located north of Hamadan in the Hamadān Province
  - Hamadan Garrison, a military installation and village in Alvandkuh-e Gharbi Rural District, in the Central District of Hamadan County, Hamadan Province, Iran
  - Hamadan International Airport

== People ==
- Banu Hamdan, a Yemeni tribal group
- Shah-e-Hamadan, or Mir Sayyid Ali Hamadani, a Persian Sūfī of the Kubrawiya order, a poet and a Muslim scholar

== See also ==
- Hamdan, a name of Arab origin. People carrying the name
- Ecbatana, ancient capital of Media at the site of Hamadan
- Hamadani (disambiguation)
- Hamdani (disambiguation)
