= Title I =

Title I, Title 1 or Title One may refer to the following legal provisions in the United States:

- Title I of the Elementary and Secondary Education Act, provides funding for the children of low-income families
- Title 1 of the Code of Federal Regulations, sets forth general provisions of U.S. federal government regulation
- Title 1 of the United States Code, outlines the general provisions of the United States Code
- Title I (New Hampshire), of the New Hampshire Revised Statutes Annotated, sets out the boundaries and symbols of the state
- Title I of the Civil Rights Act of 1964, bars unequal application of voter registration requirements
- Title I of the Civil Rights Act of 1968, establishes federally-protected activities related to civil rights
- Title I of the Patriot Act, the first provision of an anti-terrorism bill
