= Banu Hut =

Hamdanid Arab tribe that centralizes in northern Yemen

Banu Hut (Arabic: بنو الحوت) is a Hamdanid Arab tribe that centralizes in northern Yemen. The tribe is branched from the Banu Hamdan tribe. They are primarily headquartered in both 'Amran and Saada. Harith al-Hamdani, one of Ali's first supporters, was from the Banu Hout of the Banu Hamdan, an ancient Qahtanite tribe of Arabia.

== See also ==
- Huth, Yemen
