= A'sha Hamdan =

Iraqi poet

Abd al-Rahman ibn Abd Allah ibn al-Harith al-Hamdani (Arabic: عبد الرحمن بن عبد الله بن الحارث الهمداني), commonly known as A'sha Hamdan (أعشى همدان) (lit. 'the Night-Blind of the Hamdan') or al-A'sha (d. 701 or 702), was a late 7th-century Kufan poet.

== Life ==
A'sha was born in Kufa. He belonged to the South Arabian tribe of Hamdan. He began his career as a Muslim traditionist and qari (Quran reader) and was married to the sister of the prominent theologian Amir al-Sha'bi, who was married to A'sha's sister. He later shifted to poetry, purportedly after dreaming of being in a room full of 'barley' (shi'r, which has the dual meaning of 'poetry'). He served in the military campaigns of the Kufans during the governorship of al-Hajjaj ibn Yusuf (r. 694–714), though evidently this was not always voluntary. One such campaign in Makran took a heavy toll on his health.

He campaigned under the Kufan commander Ibn al-Ash'ath in Daylam. According to one of his poems, he was taken captive there before gaining the love of a Daylamite woman who helped free him. He became akin to the spokesman of Ibn al-Ash'ath during the mass Iraqi rebellion he led against al-Hajjaj and the Umayyads in general. He was present at the Battle of Dayr al-Jamajim in 701 or 702 where Ibn al-Ash'ash was put to flight and al-A'sha captured by the Umayyad troops. He was brought before al-Hajjaj who condemned him for his critical verses against him and the Umayyads. His attempt to win al-Hajjaj's favor by reciting to him an ode of praise did not sway the governor, who had him executed.

== Poetry ==
The historian G. J. H. van Gelder describes A'sha's poetry as "an interesting mixture of the personal and the political". The Encyclopaedia of Islam calls his poems "reflexes of his adventures and political sentiments". In his poems, he often championed the Yaman (South Arabian) tribal faction to which he belonged, in opposition to the northern Arab faction. His poems would be turned into songs by his fellow Hamdani tribesman, the musician Ahmad al-Nasbi.

Al-Tabari preserved the following fragment of A'sha's poem praising Ibn al-Ash'ath (Abd al-Rahman) and condemning al-Hajjaj:

For a lover who has emerged in Zabulistan,
there have been two liars from Thaqif,
their past liar and a second one.
May my Lord give power to Hamdan over Thaqif
For a day until nighttime, so consoling us for what took place [before].
We betook ourselves to the devilish infidel,
When, in unbelief after belief, he exceeded the bounds,
with the noble lord Abd al-Rahman.
He set forth with a throng of Qahtan, like locusts
While from Ma'add ibn Adnan he brought
A tumultuous and might multitude.
So tell Hajjaj, Satan's friend, [if he can],
Stand steady against Madhhij and Hamdan,
that they will give him to drink from the goblet of poison,
And will send him off to the villages of Ibn Marwan.

== Bibliography ==
- Hinds, Martin, ed. (1990). The History of al-Ṭabarī, Volume XXIII: The Zenith of the Marwānid House: The Last Years of ʿAbd al-Malik and the Caliphate of al-Walīd, A.D. 700–715/A.H. 81–95. SUNY Series in Near Eastern Studies. Albany, New York: State University of New York Press. ISBN 978-0-88706-721-1.
- Kilpatrick, Hilary (2003). Making the Great Book of Songs: Compilation and the Author's Craft in Abū l-Faraj al-Iṣbahānī's Kitāb al-Aghānī. London: Routledge. ISBN 9780700717019.
- Van Gelder, G. J. H. (1998). "A'sha Hamdan". In Meisami, Julie Scott; Starkey, Paul (eds.). Encyclopedia of Arabic Literature. Vol. 1. Routledge. p. 108. ISBN 0-415-18571-8.
- Wensinck, A. J. & von Grunebaum, G. E. (1960). "Aʾshā Hamdān". In Gibb, H. A. R.; Kramers, J. H.; Lévi-Provençal, E.; Schacht, J.; Lewis, B. & Pellat, Ch. (eds.). The Encyclopaedia of Islam, Second Edition. Volume I: A–B. Leiden: E. J. Brill. p. 690. OCLC 495469456.
