= Ibn al-Ash'ath =

Umayyad noble, general, and rebel (died 704)

- عبد الرحمن بن محمد بن الأشعث
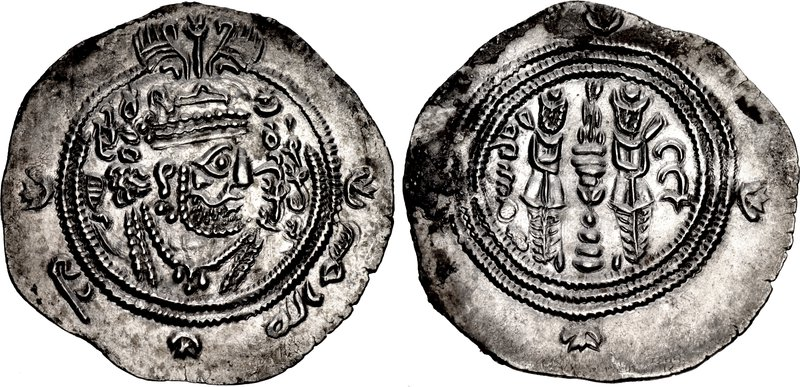
- Died: 704; Rukhkhaj
- Relatives: Muhammad ibn al-Ash'ath (father); al-Ash'ath ibn Qays (grandfather); Umm Amr bint Sa'id ibn Qays al-Hamdani (mother)
- Military career
- Allegiance: Umayyad Caliphate
- Service years: 680–700
- Conflicts: Campaign against al-Mukhtar; Umayyad campaigns against Shabib ibn Yazid al-Shaybani and the Zunbil

Abd al-Rahman ibn Muhammad ibn al-Ash'ath (Note: Arabic: عبد الرحمن بن محمد بن الأشعث, romanized: ʿAbd al-Raḥmān ibn Muḥammad ibn al-Ashʿath) (died 704), commonly known as Ibn al-Ash'ath after his grandfather, was a prominent Arab nobleman and military commander during the Umayyad Caliphate, most notable for leading a failed rebellion against the Umayyad viceroy of the east, al-Hajjaj ibn Yusuf, in 700–703.

Ibn al-Ash'ath was a scion of a noble family of the Kinda tribe that had settled in the Arab garrison town of Kufa in Iraq. He played a minor role in the Second Fitna (680–692) and then served as governor of Rayy. After the appointment of al-Hajjaj as governor of Iraq and the eastern provinces of the Caliphate in 694, relations between al-Hajjaj and the Iraqi tribal nobility quickly became strained, as the policies of the Syria-based Umayyad regime aimed to reduce the Iraqis' privileges and status. Nevertheless, in 699, al-Hajjaj appointed Ibn al-Ash'ath as commander of a huge Iraqi army, the so-called "Peacock Army", to subdue the troublesome principality of Zabulistan, whose ruler, the Zunbil, vigorously resisted Arab expansion. In 700, al-Hajjaj's overbearing behaviour caused Ibn al-Ash'ath and the army to revolt. After patching up an agreement with the Zunbil, the army marched back to Iraq. On the way, the mutiny against al-Hajjaj developed into a full-fledged anti-Umayyad rebellion and acquired religious overtones.

Al-Hajjaj initially retreated before the rebels' superior numbers, but quickly defeated and drove them out of Basra. Nevertheless, the rebels seized Kufa, where supporters started flocking. The revolt gained widespread support among those who were discontented with the Umayyad regime, especially the religious zealots known as Qurra ('Quran readers'). Caliph Abd al-Malik tried to negotiate terms, including the dismissal of al-Hajjaj, but the hardliners among the rebel leadership pressured Ibn al-Ash'ath into rejecting the Caliph's terms. In the subsequent Battle of Dayr al-Jamajim, the rebel army was decisively defeated by al-Hajjaj's Syrian troops. Al-Hajjaj pursued the survivors, who under Ibn al-Ash'ath fled east. Most of the rebels were captured by the governor of Khurasan, while Ibn al-Ash'ath himself fled to Zabulistan. His fate is unclear, as some accounts hold that the Zunbil executed him after al-Hajjaj demanded his surrender, while most sources claim that he committed suicide to avoid being handed over to his enemies.

The suppression of Ibn al-Ash'ath's revolt signalled the end of the power of the tribal nobility of Iraq, which henceforth came under the direct control of the Umayyad regime's staunchly loyal Syrian troops. Later revolts, under Yazid ibn al-Muhallab in 720 and Zayd ibn Ali in 740, also failed, and it was not until the success of the Abbasid Revolution that the Syrian dominance of Iraq was broken.

== Early life ==
=== Origin and family ===
Abd al-Rahman ibn Muhammad ibn al-Ash'ath was a member of a noble family from the Kinda tribe in the Hadramawt in eastern Yemen. His grandfather, Ma'dikarib ibn Qays, better known by his nickname al-Ash'ath (lit. 'He with the dishevelled hair'), was an important chieftain who submitted to Muhammad, but rebelled during the Ridda wars. Defeated, al-Ash'ath was nevertheless pardoned and married Caliph Abu Bakr's sister, Umm Farwa, who became his chief wife. He went on to participate in the crucial battles of the early Muslim conquests, Yarmouk and Qadisiyya, and held governorships in the newly conquered province of Adharbayjan. His role in the negotiations at the Battle of Siffin has led to his widespread condemnation in later, mainly pro-Shi'a sources, for persuading Ali to abandon his military advantage and submit to an arbitration that ultimately undermined his position. The real events remain unclear, but although al-Ash'ath was also close to Ali's Umayyad rivals—two of his daughters married into the Umayyad house—he nevertheless remained loyal to Ali, and another daughter married Ali's son al-Hasan. Al-Ash'ath later led the Kindite quarter in the garrison town of Kufa, where he died in 661.

Ibn al-Ash'ath's father, Muhammad (a son of Umm Farwa) was less distinguished, serving an unsuccessful tenure as Umayyad governor of Tabaristan, and becoming involved in the Second Fitna as a supporter of the anti-Umayyad rebel Ibn al-Zubayr, being killed in 686/7 in the campaign that overthrew the pro-Shi'a rebel leader Mukhtar al-Thaqafi. Like his father at Siffin, he is denigrated by pro-Shi'a sources for his ambiguous role in the Battle of Karbala in 680, being held responsible for the arrests of Muslim ibn Aqil and Hani ibn Urwa, prominent supporters of Ali's son, al-Husayn.

Ibn al-Ash'ath's mother, Umm Amr, was the daughter of the South Arab tribal leader Sa'id ibn Qays al-Hamdani. Ibn al-Ash'ath had four brothers, Ishaq, Qasim, Sabbah, and Isma'il, of whom the first three also fought in the campaigns in Tabaristan.

=== Early career ===
The Umayyads and their rival factions during the Second Fitna, c. 686

According to the 10th-century historian al-Tabari, the young Ibn al-Ash'ath accompanied his father and participated in his political activities: in 680 he helped arrest Muslim ibn Aqil. In 686/7, he fought under the Umayyad governor Mus'ab ibn al-Zubayr against Mukhtar, in the campaign in which his father was killed. After Mukhtar was killed during the fight, along with the other Kufan ashraf (Arab tribal nobility) who served under Mus'ab, Ibn al-Ash'ath urged the execution of Mukhtar's followers, who had barricaded themselves in the governor's palace in Kufa. This was not only to avenge the loss of their own kinsmen during the campaign, but also because of the deeply ingrained hostility of the ashraf to the non-Arab converts to Islam (the mawali), who had formed the bulk of Mukhtar's supporters. As a result, some 6,000 of Mukhtar's men were executed.

Ibn al-Ash'ath disappears from the record during the next few years, but after Mus'ab was defeated and killed by the Umayyad caliph Abd al-Malik ibn Marwan at the Battle of Maskin in October 691, he, like other followers of Mus'ab, went over to the Umayyads. In early 692, he participated in a campaign against the Azariqa Kharijites in al-Ahwaz, at the head of 5,000 Kufan troops. After the Kharijites were defeated, he went on to take up the governorship of Rayy.

=== Expedition against Shabib al-Shaybani ===
In 694, Abd al-Malik appointed the trusted and capable al-Hajjaj ibn Yusuf as the new governor of Iraq. In 697, his remit was expanded to cover the entirety of the eastern Caliphate, including Khurasan and Sistan (Sijistan), effectively making him a viceroy of half the Umayyad realm. The post was of particular political sensitivity due to the long history of Kharijism and political dissent in Iraq. This was particularly the case in Ibn al-Ash'ath's home town of Kufa, which contained people from almost all Arab tribes, but also many of those undesired elsewhere, such as the vanquished of the Ridda wars. Although it dominated the fertile lands of the Sawad, many of the latter were assigned by the Umayyads to princes of the dynasty, while the average Kufan was given—increasingly minuscule—parcels of land as a reward for military service. Finally, the Kufans were largely left out of the spoils of conquest in the east; it was the Basrans who secured the lion's share, taking over far more extensive and richer territory like Khurasan or Sindh, while the Kufans were left with the mountains of Jibal and central Persia as their city's sole dependencies.

In late 695, al-Hajjaj entrusted Ibn al-Ash'ath with 6,000 horsemen and the campaign against the Kharijite rebels under Shabib ibn Yazid al-Shaybani. Although the Kharijites numbered just a few hundred, they benefited from Shabib's tactical skill and had defeated every Umayyad commander sent against them thus far. Advised by the general al-Jazl Uthman ibn Sa'id al-Kindi, who had been defeated by Shabib previously, Ibn al-Ash'ath pursued the Kharijites, but displayed great caution in order to avoid falling into a trap. Notably, each night he dug a trench around his camp, thus foiling Shabib's plans to launch a surprise night attack. Unable to catch Ibn al-Ash'ath unawares, Shabib instead resolved to wear down his pursuers, by retreating before them into barren and inhospitable terrain, waiting for them to catch up, and retreating again.

As a result, the governor of al-Mada'in, Uthman ibn Qatan, wrote to al-Hajjaj criticizing Ibn al-Ash'ath's leadership as timid and ineffective. Al-Hajjaj responded by giving command to Uthman, but when the latter attacked Shabib on 20 March 696, the government army suffered a heavy defeat, losing around 900 men and fleeing to Kufa. Uthman himself was killed, while Ibn al-Ash'ath, who lost his horse, managed to escape with the help of a friend and reached Kufa. Fearing reprisals for the defeat by al-Hajjaj, he remained in hiding until the governor of Iraq granted him pardon.

=== Rivalry with al-Hajjaj ===
Despite this setback, relations between Ibn al-Ash'ath and al-Hajjaj were initially friendly, and al-Hajjaj's son married one of Ibn al-Ash'ath's sisters. Gradually, however, the two men became estranged. The sources attribute this to Ibn al-Ash'ath's overweening pride as one of the foremost of the ashraf, and his aspirations to leadership: al-Mas'udi records that he adopted the title of nasir al-mu'minin ('Helper of the Faithful'), an implicit challenge to the Umayyads, who were implied to be false believers. In addition, he claimed to be the Qahtani, a messianic figure in South Arab ("Yamani") tribal tradition who was expected to raise them to domination.

Ibn al-Ash'ath's pretensions irked al-Hajjaj, whose hostile remarks—such as "Look how he walks! How I should like to cut off his head!"—were conveyed to Ibn al-Ash'ath and served to deepen their hostility to outright mutual hatred. Al-Tabari suggested that al-Hajjaj relied on the fear he inspired to keep Ibn al-Ash'ath in check. Modern scholarship on the other hand holds that the portrayal of the great personal animosity between the two men is likely to be exaggerated. Thus the historian Laura Veccia Vaglieri attributed these reports to the Arabic sources' tendency to "explain historical events by incidents relating to persons", rather than reflecting the actual relationship between the two men, especially given the fact that Ibn al-Ash'ath faithfully served al-Hajjaj in a number of posts, culminating in his appointment to lead a major campaign into Sistan.

== Revolt ==
=== Sistan campaign ===
In 698/9, the Umayyad governor of Sistan, Ubayd Allah ibn Abi Bakra, suffered a severe defeat by the semi-independent ruler of Zabulistan, known as the Zunbil. The Zunbil drew the Arabs deep into his country and cut them off, so that they managed to extricate themselves only with great difficulty, after suffering many losses (particularly among the Kufan contingent), and paying a ransom and leaving hostages for their safe departure.

Infuriated by this setback, al-Hajjaj raised an Iraqi army from Basra and Kufa, to be sent against the Zunbil. 20,000 strong, the army comprised many members of the most eminent families of the two garrison towns. Whether due to the splendour of their equipment, or as an allusion to what historian G. R. Hawting calls the "proud and haughty manner of the Kufan soldiers and ashraf who composed it", this army became known in history as the "army of Peacocks" (Arabic: جيش الطَوَاوِيسُ, romanized: jaysh al-ṭawāwīs). Two different generals were appointed by al-Hajjaj in succession to command it, before he appointed Ibn al-Ash'ath instead. In view of their bad relations, the sources report that the appointment came as a surprise to many; an uncle of Ibn al-Ash'ath even approached al-Hajjaj and suggested that his nephew might revolt, but al-Hajjaj did not rescind his appointment.

It is unclear whether Ibn al-Ash'ath himself had joined the army from the outset or whether, according to an alternative tradition, he had originally been sent to Kirman to punish a local leader, Himyan ibn Adi al-Sadusi, who had refused to help the governors of Sistan and Makran. A different account suggests that he had been sent to fight the Kharijites. Historian A. A. Dixon opined that the 9th-century account of Ibn A'tham, according to which Ibn al-Ash'ath and the Peacock Army suppressed al-Sadusi's mutiny on their way to the east, may be preferable, as it appears to reconcile the divergent reports.

After taking up the leadership of the army in 699, Ibn al-Ash'ath led it to Sistan, where he united the local troops (muqatila) with the Peacock Army. A contingent from Tabaristan are also said to have joined him. Faced with such a formidable enemy, the Zunbil made peace overtures. Ibn al-Ash'ath rejected them and—in marked contrast to his predecessor's direct assault—began a systematic campaign to first secure the lowlands surrounding the mountainous heart of the Zunbil's kingdom: he established a base of operations at Bust, and slowly and methodically began to capture villages and fortresses one by one, installing garrisons in them and linking them with messengers. A foray by his brother up the Arghandab River found that the Zunbil had withdrawn his forces, leaving behind only elderly and the corpses of Ibn Abi Bakra's expedition. Ibn al-Ash'ath then withdrew to Bust to spend the winter of 699/700, and to allow his troops to acclimatize themselves to the unfamiliar conditions of the area.

=== Outbreak of the revolt ===
Once al-Hajjaj received Ibn al-Ash'ath's messages informing him of the break in operations, he replied in what Veccia Vaglieri described as "a series of arrogant and offensive messages ordering him to penetrate into the heart of Zabulistan and there to fight the enemy to the death". Otherwise, al-Hajjaj threatened to give command to Ibn al-Ash'ath's brother, and reduce Ibn al-Ash'ath himself to the rank of an ordinary soldier.

"We will not obey the enemy of God, who like a Pharaoh coerces us to the farthest campaigns and keeps us here so that we can never see our wives and children; the gain is always his; if we are victorious, the conquered land is his; if we perish, then he is rid of us."

— Reply of the soldiers to Ibn al-Ash'ath regarding al-Hajjaj's orders

Offended by the insinuation of cowardice, Ibn al-Ash'ath called an assembly of the army's leadership, in which he informed them of al-Hajjaj's orders for an immediate advance and his decision to refuse to obey. He then went before the assembled troops and repeated al-Hajjaj's instructions, calling upon them to decide what should be done. According to another version of events, transmitted by the 9th-century historians Baladhuri and Ibn A'tham, to apply pressure to his commanders, Ibn al-Ash'ath also fabricated a letter by al-Hajjaj ordering him to dismiss or execute some of them. As modern historians have commented, "little aggravation was needed" (Dixon). The "prospect of a long and difficult campaign so far from Iraq" (Hawting), coupled with existing grievances over al-Hajjaj's harsh administration, was enough to turn the troops against the governor of Iraq. The assembled army denounced al-Hajjaj, proclaiming him deposed, and swore allegiance to Ibn al-Ash'ath instead. Dixon furthermore points out that the first of the commanders to swear allegiance to Ibn al-Ash'ath are known to have been Shi'a sympathizers from Kufa, who had participated in Mukhtar's uprising. Ibn al-Ash'ath's brothers, however, as well as the governor of Khurasan, al-Muhallab ibn Abi Sufra, refused to join the rebellion.

Following this open revolt, Ibn al-Ash'ath hastily concluded an agreement with the Zunbil, whereby if he was victorious in the coming conflict with al-Hajjaj, he would accord the Zunbil generous treatment, while if he was defeated, the Zunbil would provide refuge. With his rear secure, Ibn al-Ash'ath left governors (amils) at Bust and Zaranj, and his army set out on the return journey to Iraq, picking up more soldiers from Kufa and Basra, who were stationed as garrisons, along the way. The sources are not in agreement as to the chronology and duration of the revolt: one tradition maintains that the revolt began in AH 81 (700/1 CE), with the invasion of Iraq in AH 82 (701 CE), and the final suppression of the revolt in AH 83 (702 CE), while another tradition moves all events a year later. Modern scholars generally favour the former interpretation.

By the time the army reached Fars, it had become clear that deposing al-Hajjaj could not be done without deposing Caliph Abd al-Malik as well, and the revolt evolved from a mutiny into a full-blown anti-Umayyad uprising, with the troops renewing their oath of allegiance (bay'ah) to Ibn al-Ash'ath.

=== Motives and driving forces of the revolt ===
The reasons for the rebellion have been the source of much discussion and theories among modern scholars. Moving away from the personal relationship between al-Hajjaj and Ibn al-Ash'ath, Alfred von Kremer suggested that the rebellion was linked with the efforts of the mawali to secure equal rights with the Arab Muslims, a movement that had already resulted in a major uprising under Mukhtar. This view was also held by von Kremer's contemporaries, August Müller and Gerlof van Vloten. Julius Wellhausen rejected this view as the main reason for the revolt, interpreting it instead as a reaction of the Iraqis in general and the ashraf in particular against the Syria-based regime of the Umayyads as represented by the overbearing (and notably low-born) al-Hajjaj. Historical sources are clear that al-Hajjaj quickly became unpopular among the Iraqis through a series of measures that, according to historian Hugh Kennedy, "[seem] almost to have goaded the Iraqis into rebellion", such as the introduction of Syrian troops—the mainstay of the Umayyad dynasty—into Iraq, the use of Iraqi troops in the arduous and unrewarding campaigns against the Kharijites, and the reduction of the Iraqi troops' pay (ata) to a level below that of the Syrian troops. The reaction against al-Hajjaj as the main driving factor behind the revolt was espoused by C. E. Bosworth as well, while A. A. Dixon highlights that Ibn al-Ash'ath was a "suitable leader" around whom the Iraqis could rally to express their opposition to al-Hajjaj, and their disaffection with the oppressive Umayyad regime.

Both Veccia Vaglieri and Hawting emphasize that Wellhausen's analysis ignores the evident religious dimension of the revolt, especially the participation of the militant zealots known as Qurra ('Quran readers'). The adherence of the Qurra was due to a number of reasons: as Iraqis, they shared the grievances against al-Hajjaj, but as religious purists, they also suspected al-Hajjaj of being disinterested in religion, and espoused a more egalitarian treatment of the mawali, as opposed to al-Hajjaj's policies aimed chiefly at extracting revenue from them. Dixon furthermore draws attention to the past Shi'a affiliations of some of the key figures of Ibn al-Ash'ath's uprising, as well as the fact that in Iraq, other ethnic and religious groups joined the uprising, notably as the Murji'ah, the Zutt of the Mesopotamian Marshes, the Asawira, and the Turkic Sayabija, clients of the Banu Tamim tribe. Even the participation of some Ibadi Kharijites is recorded, as well as the early Qadari leader Ma'bad al-Juhani.

While according to Hawting the "religious polemic used by both sides [...] is stereotyped, unspecific and to be found in other contexts", there do appear to have been specific religious grievances, notably the accusation that the Umayyads were neglecting the ritual prayer. It seems that the revolt began as a simple mutiny against an overbearing governor who made impossible demands of the troops, but, at least by the time the army reached Fars, a religious element had emerged, represented by the Qurra. Given the close intertwining of religion and politics at the time, the religious element quickly became dominant, as seen by the difference between the bay'ah sworn at the beginning of the revolt and that exchanged between the army and Ibn al-Ash'ath at Istakhr in Fars. While in the first Ibn al-Ash'ath declared as his intention to "depose al-Hajjaj, the enemy of God", in the latter, he exhorted his men to "[defend] the Book of God and the Sunna of His Prophet, to depose the imāms of error, to fight against those who regard [the blood of the Prophet's kin] as licit". Initially directed chiefly against the person of al-Hajjaj, the uprising had by then morphed into a "revolt against the caliph and the Umayyad rule in general".

Indeed, although Ibn al-Ash'ath remained at the head of the uprising, Veccia Vaglieri suggested that after this point "one has the impression that [...] the control of the revolt slipped from his hands", or that, as Wellhausen commented, "he was urged on in spite of himself, and even if he would, could not have banished the spirits which he had called up. It was as if an avalanche came rushing down sweeping every thing before it". This interpretation is corroborated by the different rhetoric and actions of Ibn al-Ash'ath and his followers, as reported in the sources: the former was ready and willing to compromise with the Umayyads, and continued to fight only because he had no alternative, while the great mass of his followers, motivated by discontent against the Umayyad regime couched in religious terms, were far more uncompromising and willing to carry on the struggle until death. Al-Hajjaj himself seems to have been aware of the distinction: in suppressing the revolt, he pardoned the Quraysh, the Syrians, and many of the other Arab clans, but executed tens of thousands among the mawali and the Zutt, who had sided with the rebels.

Apart from religious motivations, modern scholars have seen in the uprising a manifestation of the intense tribal factionalism between the northern Arab and southern Arab ("Yamani") tribal groups prevalent at the time. Thus, according to Veccia Vaglieri, a poem by the famous poet A'sha Hamdan in celebration of the rebellion shows a tribal motivation of the rebel troops: al-Hajjaj is denounced as an apostate and a "friend of the devil", while Ibn al-Ash'ath is portrayed as the champion of the Yamani Qahtani and Hamdani tribes against the northern Arab Ma'adis and Thaqafis. On the other hand, as Hawting points out, this is insufficient evidence to ascribe purely tribal motivations to the revolt: if Ibn al-Ash'ath's movement was indeed led largely by Yamanis, this simply reflects the fact that they were the dominant element in Kufa, and while al-Hajjaj himself was a northerner, his main commander was a southerner. Dixon, furthermore, interprets the same poem by A'sha Hamdan differently, and contradicts Veccia Vaglieri in insisting that "the verses show clearly that both the Ma'adites and the Yemenites (Hamdan, Madhhij and Qahtan) allied themselves against al-Hajjaj and his tribe, Thaqif", highlighting that this was "one of the rare occasions where we find the Northern and Southern Arabs standing together against a common foe".

=== Fight for control of Iraq ===
Map of Iraq (Lower Mesopotamia) in the early Islamic period

Informed of the revolt, al-Hajjaj went to Basra and requested reinforcements from the caliph. Realising the seriousness of the revolt, Caliph Abd al-Malik sent a stream of reinforcements to Iraq. After staying for some time in Fars, the rebel army, which is reported to have numbered 33,000 cavalry and 120,000 infantry, began advancing towards Iraq. On 24 or 25 January 701, Ibn al-Ash'ath overwhelmed al-Hajjaj's advance guard at Tustar. At the news of this defeat, al-Hajjaj withdrew to Basra and then, as he could not possibly hold the city, left it as well for nearby al-Zawiya.

Ibn al-Ash'ath entered Basra on 13 February 701, to an enthusiastic welcome. Ibn al-Ash'ath fortified Basra, and over the next month, a series of skirmishes were fought between the forces of Ibn al-Ash'ath and al-Hajjaj, in which the former generally held the upper hand. Finally, in early March, the two armies met for a pitched battle. Ibn al-Ash'ath initially prevailed, but in the end al-Hajjaj's Syrians, under the general Sufyan ibn al-Abrad al-Kalbi, carried off a victory. Many rebels fell, especially among the Qurra', forcing Ibn al-Ash'ath to withdraw to his home town of Kufa, taking with him the Kufan troops and the élite of the Basran cavalry. At Kufa, Ibn al-Ash'ath was well received, but found the citadel occupied by Matar ibn Najiya, an officer from al-Mada'in, and was forced to take it by assault.

Ibn al-Ash'ath left Abd al-Rahman ibn Abbas al-Hashimi as his commander in Basra. Abd al-Rahman ibn Abbas tried but was unable to hold the city, as the populace opened the gates in exchange for a pardon after a few days. Abd al-Rahman ibn Abbas too withdrew with as many Basrans as would follow him to Kufa, where Ibn al-Ash'ath's forces swelled further with the arrival of large numbers of anti-Umayyad volunteers. After taking control of Basra—and executing some 11,000 of its people, despite his pledge of pardon—al-Hajjaj marched on Kufa. His army was harassed by Ibn al-Ash'ath's cavalry under Abd al-Rahman ibn Abbas, but reached the environs of the city and set up camp at Dayr Qarra, on the right bank of the Euphrates, so as to secure his lines of communication with Syria. In response, Ibn al-Ash'ath left Kufa in mid-April 701, and with an army reportedly 200,000 strong, half of whom were mawali, approached al-Hajjaj's army and set up camp at Dayr al-Jamajim. Both armies fortified their camps by digging trenches and, as before, engaged in skirmishes. Whatever the true numbers of Ibn al-Ash'ath's force, al-Hajjaj was in a difficult position: although reinforcements from Syria were constantly arriving, his army was considerably outnumbered by the rebels, and his position was difficult to resupply with provisions.

In the meantime, Ibn al-Ash'ath's progress had sufficiently alarmed the Umayyad court that they sought a negotiated settlement, despite the contrary advice of al-Hajjaj. Caliph Abd al-Malik sent his brother Muhammad and son Abdallah at the head of an army to Iraq, but also carrying an offer to Ibn al-Ash'ath: the dismissal of al-Hajjaj, the appointment of Ibn al-Ash'ath as governor over one of the Iraqi towns of his choice, and a raise in the Iraqis' pay so that they received the same amount as the Syrians. Ibn al-Ash'ath was inclined to accept, but the more radical of his followers, especially the Qurra, refused, and pushed for outright victory. The rebels were aware of the Syrians' supply problems, and considered the offered terms an admission of the government's weakness. With the negotiations failing, the two armies continued to skirmish—the sources report that the skirmishing lasted for 100 days with 48 engagements. The Qurra particularly distinguished themselves for their bravery in this period, until their leader, Jabala ibn Zahr ibn Qays al-Ju'fi, was killed, after which they began to disperse.

This went on until late July 701, when the two armies met in battle at Dayr al-Jamajim. Again Ibn al-Ash'ath initially held the upper hand, but the Syrians prevailed in the end: shortly before the sun set, Ibn al-Ash'ath's men broke and scattered. The defeat turned into a flight, aided by al-Hajjaj's offers of pardon to rebels who surrendered themselves. Failing to rally his troops, Ibn al-Ash'ath with a handful of followers fled to Kufa, where he took farewell of his family. As Hawting commented, the contrast "between the discipline and organisation of the Umayyads and their largely Syrian support and the lack of these qualities among their opponents in spite of, or perhaps rather because of, the more righteous and religious flavour of the opposition" is a recurring pattern in the civil wars of the period.

Victorious, al-Hajjaj entered Kufa, where he tried and executed many rebels, but also pardoned those who submitted after admitting that through revolt they had become infidels. In the meantime, however, one of Ibn al-Ash'ath's supporters, Ubayd Allah ibn Abd al-Rahman ibn Samura al-Qurashi, had recaptured Basra, to where Ibn al-Ash'ath now headed; and another, Muhammad ibn Sa'd ibn Abi Waqqas, had captured al-Mada'in. Al-Hajjaj remained for a month in Kufa, before setting out to meet Ibn al-Ash'ath. The two armies met at Maskin, on the river Dujayl. After two weeks of skirmishing, al-Hajjaj delivered the final blow by launching a simultaneous attack on the rebel camp from two sides: while he with the main part of his army attacked from one side, a portion of his army, guided by a shepherd, crossed the marshes and launched itself on the camp from the rear. Caught by surprise, the rebel army was nearly annihilated, with many of its troops drowning in the river in their attempt to flee.

=== Flight east and death ===
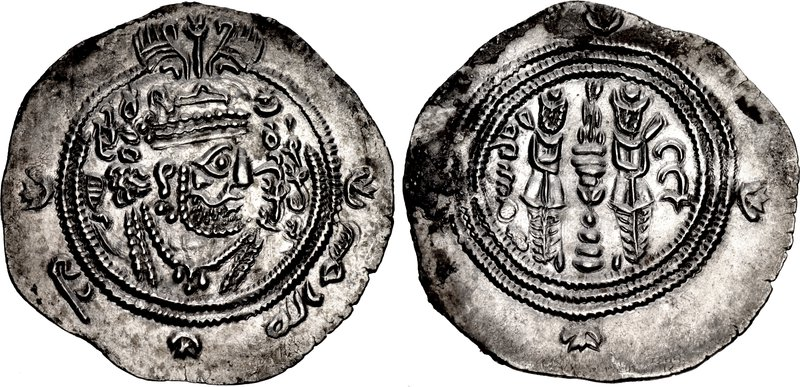
Silver Sasanian-style dirham, minted in Sistan in AH 82 (701 CE) in the name of Ibn al-Ash'ath

Following this second defeat, Ibn al-Ash'ath fled east, towards Sistan, with a few survivors. Al-Hajjaj sent troops under Umara ibn al-Tamim al-Lakhmi to intercept them. Umara caught up with them twice, at Sus and Sabur. In the first battle, the rebels were defeated, but they prevailed in the second, allowing Ibn al-Ash'ath and his men to reach Kirman and thence move to Sistan. There they were refused entry into Zaranj by the amil Abdallah ibn Amir al-Ba'ar al-Tamimi, whom Ibn al-Ash'ath had himself appointed over the city. Moving to Bust, Ibn al-Ash'ath was arrested by the local amil, Iyad ibn Himyan al-Sadusi, likewise his own appointee, who thus sought to win the favour of al-Hajjaj. The Zunbil, however, remained true to his word: learning of this event, he came to Bust and forced Ibn al-Ash'ath's release, taking him with him to Zabulistan and treating him with much honour.

Once free, Ibn al-Ash'ath assumed command of some 60,000 supporters who had assembled in Sistan in the meantime, led by his lieutenants, Abd al-Rahman ibn Abbas al-Hashimi and Ubayd Allah ibn Abd al-Rahman ibn Samura al-Qurashi. With their support, he seized Zaranj, where he punished the amil. Faced with the approach of the Syrian Umayyad troops under Umara ibn al-Tamim, however, most of Ibn al-Ash'ath's followers urged him to go to Khurasan, where they would be hopefully able to recruit more followers, evade pursuit in the vast expanse of the region, or be able to sit out the Umayyad attacks until either al-Hajjaj or Caliph Abd al-Malik died and the political situation changed. Ibn al-Ash'ath bowed to their pressure, but soon after a group of 2,000 men under Ibn Samura defected to the Umayyads. Disillusioned with the fickleness of the Iraqis, Ibn al-Ash'ath returned to Zabulistan with those who would follow him there. Most of the rebels remained in Khurasan, choosing Abd al-Rahman ibn Abbas al-Hashimi as their leader, and sacking Herat. This forced the local governor, Yazid ibn al-Muhallab, to send an army against them, resulting in an overwhelming defeat for the rebels. Yazid released those who belonged to the Yamani tribes related to his own, and sent the rest to al-Hajjaj, who executed most of them. In the meantime, Umara quickly effected the surrender of Sistan, by offering lenient terms to the garrisons if they surrendered without struggle.

Ibn al-Ash'ath remained safe under the protection of the Zunbil, but al-Hajjaj, fearing that he might raise another revolt, sent several letters to the Zunbil, mixing threats and promises, to secure his surrender. Finally, in 704 the Zunbil gave in, in exchange for lifting the annual tribute for 7 or 10 years. Accounts of Ibn al-Ash'ath's end differ: one version holds that he was executed by the Zunbil himself, or that he died of consumption. The more widespread account, however, holds that he was confined to a remote castle at Rukhkhaj in anticipation of his extradition to al-Hajjaj, and chained to his warden, but that to avoid being handed over, he threw himself from the top of the castle (along with his warden) to his death. His head was cut off and sent to al-Hajjaj in Iraq. According to al-Tabari, al-Hajjaj then sent it to Abd al-Malik, who in turn sent it to his brother Abd al-Aziz, the governor of Egypt. One tradition holds that Ibn al-Ash'ath's head was buried there, while another that it was then taken to Hadramawt and thrown into a well.

== Legacy ==
The failure of Ibn al-Ash'ath's revolt led to the tightening of Umayyad control over Iraq. Al-Hajjaj founded a permanent garrison for the Syrian troops at Wasit, situated between Basra and Kufa, and the Iraqis, regardless of social status, were deprived of any real power in the governance of the region. This was coupled with a reform of the salary system by al-Hajjaj: whereas hitherto the salary had been calculated based on the role of one's ancestors in the early Muslim conquests, it now became limited to those actively participating in campaigns. As most of the army was now composed of Syrians, this measure gravely injured the interests of the Iraqis, who regarded this as another impious attack on hallowed institutions. In addition, extensive land reclamation and irrigation works were undertaken in the Sawad, but this was limited mostly to around Wasit, and the proceeds went to the Umayyads and their clients, not the Iraqi nobility. As a result, the political power of the once mighty Kufan élites was soon broken.

Al-Hajjaj also retaliated against individuals and entire communities, whom he suspected of having supported Ibn al-Ash'ath's uprising. The mawali were expelled from Iraq's garrison cities, while the Christian Arabs of the village of Najran near Kufa saw their tribute raised, and the Asawira of Basra saw their houses destroyed, their salaries reduced, and many were exiled. In order to punish the native Persian aristocracy of the dihqans, which had survived from pre-Islamic times and allied with the Arab ashraf, al-Hajjaj deliberately did not repair the breaches in the canal system around Kashkar on the west bank of the Tigris. This ruined the economic basis of the dihqans, while the foundation of Wasit on the eastern side of the Tigris hastened the decline of the older settlements. As late as 712, al-Hajjaj is recorded as executing Sa'id ibn Jubayr, one of the Qurra, who had fled to Mecca.

It was not until 720 that the Iraqis rebelled once again, under Yazid ibn al-Muhallab, "the last of the old-style Iraqi champions" (Hugh Kennedy), and even then, support was ambivalent, and the revolt was defeated. Two of Ibn al-Ash'ath's nephews, Muhammad ibn Ishaq and Uthman ibn Ishaq, supported the rebellion, but most remained quiescent and content with their role as local dignitaries. A few held posts in Kufa under the early Abbasids. Perhaps the most famous of the family's later members is the philosopher al-Kindi (c. 801–873). Another uprising, that of Zayd ibn Ali, a great-grandson of Ali, broke out in 740. Zayd also promised to right injustices (restoration of the ata, distribution of the revenue from the Sawad, an end to distant campaigns) and to restore rule "according to the Quran and the Sunna". Once more, the Kufans deserted it at the critical moment, and the revolt was defeated by the Umayyads. Discontent with the Umayyad government continued to simmer, and during the Abbasid Revolution, Iraq rose up in support of the rebellion. Kufa overthrew Umayyad rule and welcomed the Abbasid army in October 749, followed immediately by the proclamation of al-Saffah as the first Abbasid caliph there.

== Sources ==
- Blankinship, Khalid Yahya (1994). The End of the Jihâd State: The Reign of Hishām ibn ʻAbd al-Malik and the Collapse of the Umayyads. Albany, New York: State University of New York Press. ISBN 978-0-7914-1827-7.
- Blankinship, Khalid Yahya (2009). "al-Ashʿath b. Qays". In Fleet, Kate; Krämer, Gudrun; Matringe, Denis; Nawas, John; Rowson, Everett (eds.). Encyclopaedia of Islam (3rd ed.). Brill Online. doi:10.1163/1573-3912_ei3_COM_23009. ISSN 1873-9830.
- Crone, Patricia (1980). Slaves on Horses: The Evolution of the Islamic Polity (1980 ed.). Cambridge: Cambridge University Press. ISBN 978-0521229616.
- Dixon, 'Abd al-Ameer (1971). The Umayyad Caliphate, 65–86/684–705: (A Political Study). London: Luzac. ISBN 978-0718901493.
- Fishbein, Michael, ed. (1990). The History of al-Ṭabarī, Volume XXI: The Victory of the Marwānids, A.D. 685–693/A.H. 66–73. SUNY Series in Near Eastern Studies. Albany, New York: State University of New York Press. ISBN 978-0-7914-0221-4.
- Hawting, Gerald R. (1993). "Muḥammad b. al-As̲h̲ʿat̲h̲". In Bosworth, C. E.; van Donzel, E.; Heinrichs, W. P. & Pellat, Ch. (eds.). The Encyclopaedia of Islam, Second Edition. Volume VII: Mif–Naz. Leiden: E. J. Brill. pp. 400–401. doi:10.1163/1573-3912_islam_SIM_5348. ISBN 978-90-04-09419-2.
- Hawting, Gerald R. (2000). The First Dynasty of Islam: The Umayyad Caliphate AD 661–750 (Second ed.). London and New York: Routledge. ISBN 0-415-24072-7.
- Howard, I. K. A., ed. (1990). The History of al-Ṭabarī, Volume XIX: The Caliphate of Yazīd ibn Muʿāwiyah, A.D. 680–683/A.H. 60–64. SUNY Series in Near Eastern Studies. Albany, New York: State University of New York Press. ISBN 978-0-7914-0040-1.
- Hoyland, Robert G. (2015). In God's Path: The Arab Conquests and the Creation of an Islamic Empire. Oxford and New York: Oxford University Press. ISBN 978-0199916368.
- Hinds, Martin, ed. (1990). The History of al-Ṭabarī, Volume XXIII: The Zenith of the Marwānid House: The Last Years of ʿAbd al-Malik and the Caliphate of al-Walīd, A.D. 700–715/A.H. 81–95. SUNY Series in Near Eastern Studies. Albany, New York: State University of New York Press. ISBN 978-0-88706-721-1.
- Kennedy, Hugh (2004) [1986]. The Prophet and the Age of the Caliphates: The Islamic Near East from the 6th to the 11th Century (Second ed.). Harlow: Longman. ISBN 978-0-582-40525-7.
- Morony, Michael G. (1984). Iraq after the Muslim Conquest. Princeton, New Jersey: Princeton University Press. ISBN 0691053952.
- Reckendorf, H. (1960). "al-As̲h̲ʿat̲h̲". In Gibb, H. A. R.; Kramers, J. H.; Lévi-Provençal, E.; Schacht, J.; Lewis, B. & Pellat, Ch. (eds.). The Encyclopaedia of Islam, Second Edition. Volume I: A–B. Leiden: E. J. Brill. pp. 696–697. doi:10.1163/1573-3912_islam_SIM_0782. OCLC 495469456.
- Rowson, Everett K., ed. (1989). The History of al-Ṭabarī, Volume XXII: The Marwānid Restoration: The Caliphate of ʿAbd al-Malik, A.D. 693–701/A.H. 74–81. SUNY Series in Near Eastern Studies. Albany, New York: State University of New York Press. ISBN 978-0-88706-975-8.
- Veccia Vaglieri, L. (1971). "Ibn al-As̲h̲ʿat̲h̲". In Lewis, B.; Ménage, V. L.; Pellat, Ch. & Schacht, J. (eds.). The Encyclopaedia of Islam, Second Edition. Volume III: H–Iram. Leiden: E. J. Brill. pp. 715–719. doi:10.1163/1573-3912_islam_COM_0317. OCLC 495469525.
- Wellhausen, Julius (1927). The Arab Kingdom and Its Fall. Translated by Margaret Graham Weir. Calcutta: University of Calcutta.
