= Ibn Qays =

Ibn Qays is an Arabic patronomyic, meaning 'son of Qays'. Notable people with the name include:

- Abdallah ibn Qais, Umayyad general
- Abu Musa `Abd Allah ibn Qays al-Ash`ari (died 662 or 672), companion of Muhammad
- Al-Dahhak ibn Qays al-Fihri (died 684), Umayyad general and governor of Damascus
- Al-Ahnaf Ibn Qays, Muslim commander and contemporary of Muhammad
- al-Ash'ath ibn Qays (599–661), Arab chief and Rashidun military commander
- Alqama ibn Qays (died 681/682 CE), Islamic scholar
- Natil ibn Qays (died 685/86), chieftain and Palestinian tribal leader
- Sa'id ibn Qays al-Hamdani, Rashidun governor and commander
- Sulaym ibn Qays, purported author of a Shi'i hadith collection
- Thabit ibn Qays, companion of Muhammad
- Zuhayr ibn Qays (died 688), Companion of Muhammad and Arab military commander
