= Scarlatti (crater) =

Crater on Mercury

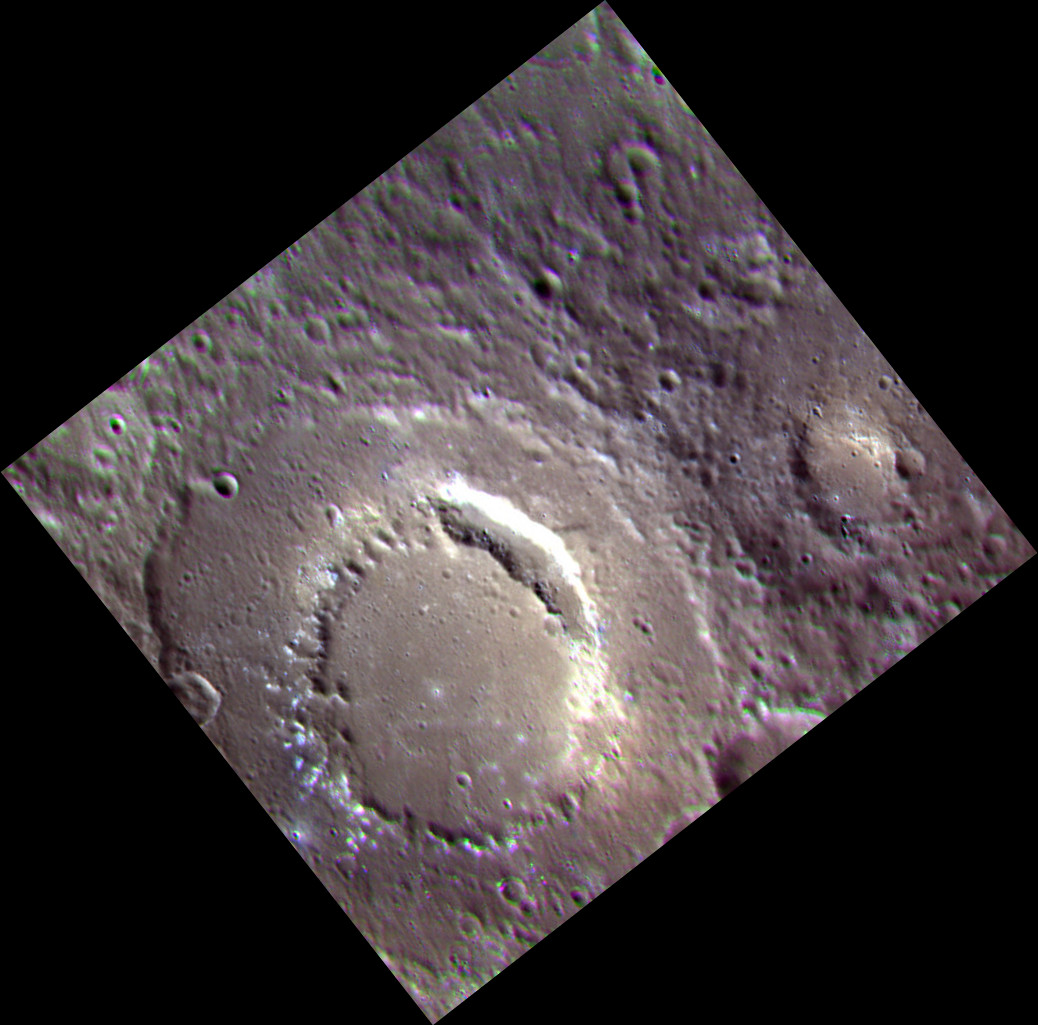
- Approximate color image by MESSENGER
- Feature type: Peak-ring impact basin
- Location: Shakespeare quadrangle, Mercury
- Coordinates: 40.7°N 101.16°W
- Diameter: 132 km (82 mi)
- Eponym: Domenico Scarlatti and Alessandro Scarlatti

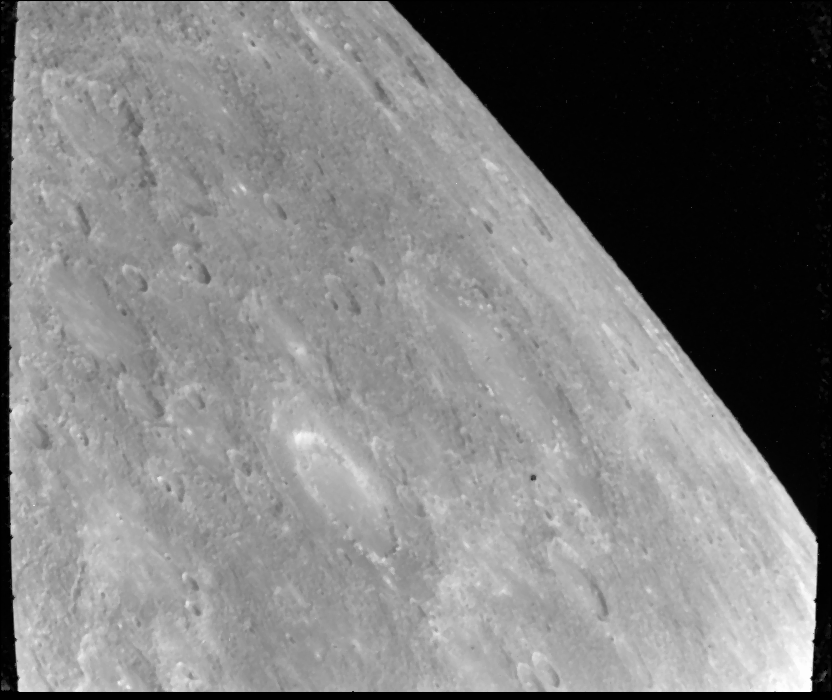
Mariner 10 image with Scarlatti and nearby Al-Hamadhani at center

Scarlatti is a pit-floored crater on Mercury, which was discovered in 1974 by the Mariner 10 spacecraft. It has a prominent peak ring, and it is one of 110 peak ring basins on Mercury. The crater floor is covered by the smooth plains material.

The crater displays an arcuate collapse feature along the northeastern peak ring. The size of the pit, which was first noticed in MESSENGER images obtained in January 2008, is 38 × 12 km. Such a feature may have resulted from collapse of a magma chamber underlying the central peak ring complex of the crater. The collapse feature is an analog of Earth's volcanic calderas. The irregular depression may also be evidence of explosive volcanism.

Scarlatti is thought to have the same age as the Caloris basin.

== Hollows ==
A cluster of hollows are present along the southwestern peak ring.

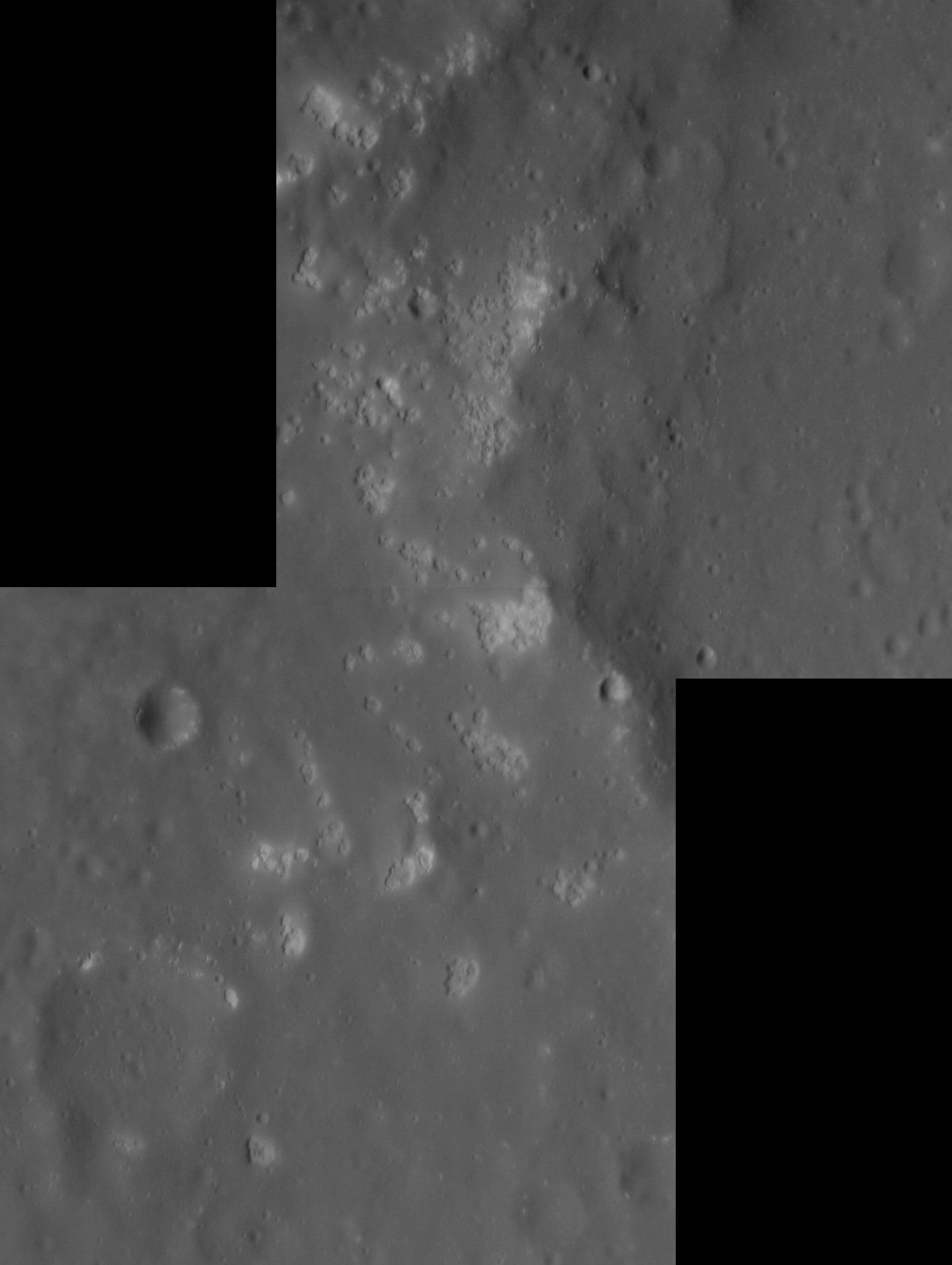
The bright patches are some of the hollows

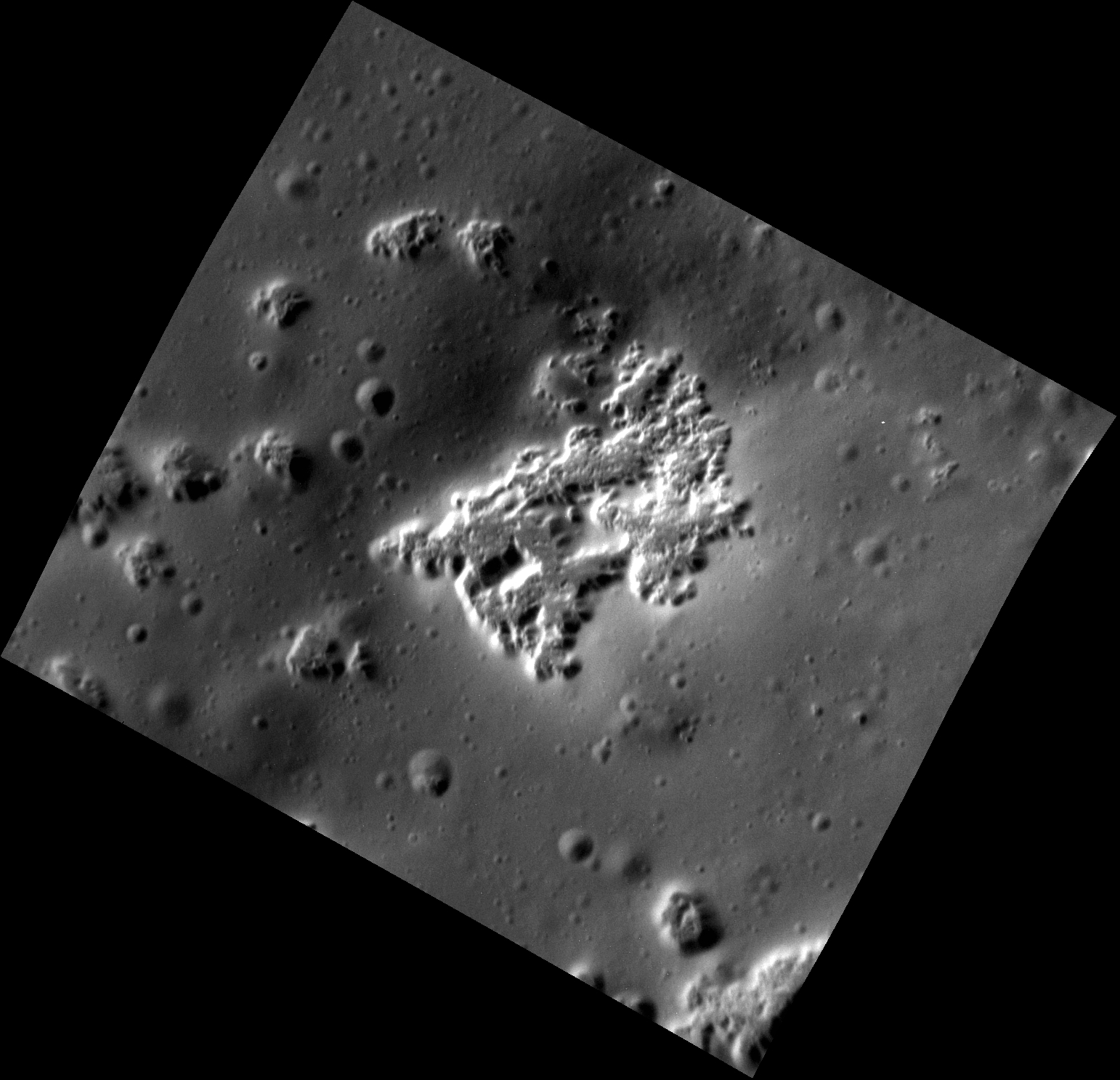
Detail of the hollows at the center of the image to the left.
