= Huth, Yemen =

Huth حوث
- Town
- Location in Yemen
- Coordinates: 16.23114°N 43.96854°E
- Country: Yemen
- Governorate: Amran
- District: Huth
- Elevation: 6,198 ft (1,889 m)
- Time zone: UTC+3 (Arabia Standard Time)

Huth (Arabic: حوث, romanized: Ḥūth, also transliterated as Houth) is a town in 'Amran Governorate, Yemen, and the seat of Huth District. It is located on the route between Sanaa and Sa'dah, on a plateau to the north of the Bawn plains.

== Name and history ==
According to the 10th-century writer al-Hamdani, Huth is named after a certain "Abdullah bin al-Sabi", who was also called "Huth" and belonged to the tribe of Hashid. The name was initially applied both to the Banu Houth tribe descended from Houth ibn al-Harith al-Hamdani and to its territory, with the modern town of Huth possibly serving as its capital. Medieval Huth was probably most important as a stopping point on the Sanaa-Sa'dah route, rather than as a strategic or administrative center. The Al-Houthi Al-Hasani family prominent in modern-day Yemen's political landscape also once used to reside in this town, and from it they derive their name, they are not to be confused with the Hamdanid Banu Houth who control the town.

== See also ==
- Al-Houthi family
- Banu Houth
- Houthis
