= Banu Al-Mashrouki =

Arabic Tribe in Lebanon

An Arab tribe in Lebanon. Banu Al-Mashrouki is a branch of the Hamdan tribe in Lebanon.

== In Lebanon ==
Banu Al-Mashrouki settled in Lebanon producing well known Maronite influential families such as the Awwad, Massa'ad, Al-Sema'ani mainly establishing Hasroun and Tanbourit

- Another branch of Bani Al-Mashrouki (Banu Al Harith) remained in Jabal Amil and were mainly Shia. A smaller group joined the Yemeni Druze and were eventually pushed by Kaysi Druze to Jabal Al Druze in Syria.

== Mashrouki Maronite Patriarchs ==
- Youssef al Sem'ani (1687-1768)
- Yaqoub Awwad (1705-1733)
- Sem'an Aawwad (1743-1756)
- Boulos Massead (1854-1890)
- Youhanna El Hajj (1817-1898)
