= Harith al-Hamdani =

Harith al-A'war al-Hamdani (Arabic: الحارث الهمداني, lit. 'Harith from Hamadan') was a prominent contemporary of the Islamic prophet, Muhammad, and also was one of the firm followers of Ali.

== Biography ==
=== A meeting with Ali ===
Perhaps one of the most important accounts involving Harith al-Hamdani is one in which Ali Ibn Abi Talib spoke to him at a time when Harith was old and in poor health. The account is in Nahj al-Balagha as follows:

Al-Harith Al-Hamadani called upon Amirul Mo'mineen (Ali Ibn Abi Talib) with a company of the Shias, and I was among them. Al-Harith walked with a bent stature, hitting his walking stick hard on the ground. He was indeed ill. So Amirul Mo'mineen came close to him and al-Harith had a good standing in his estimation, and he said: "How do you find yourself, O Harith?"
He said: "The vicissitude of time has overtaken me, and the dispute among your companions about you and the three before you, has added to my anguish and anger. :There are those who have gone to the extreme in their passionate love for you, and those who are yours in moderation, and those who waver in doubt, not knowing whether to proceed or recoil."
He (Ali) said: "Suffice it for you, O brother (from) Hamadan! Be it known that my best followers are the people united on the middle path. To them should the extremists return, and with them should the hesitants join."
Then al-Harith said: "My father and mother be your ransom, could you remove the filth from our hearts, and make us as sure about our affair as seeing with one's eyes?"
He (Ali) said: "That is enough for you. You are possessed by confusion. Surely, the religion of God is not known by the people, it is recognized by the sign of Truth. Know the Truth, and you shall know its people. O Harith, surely Truth is the best and most sublime narration, and whosoever utters it is indeed a fighter (a soldier of Truth). I have informed you the Truth, so lend me your ear and inform among your friends who have sound judgement.
Be it known that I am a slave of Allah, the brother of His messenger and his first confirmer. I confirmed his truth when Adam lay between the spirit and the body. Then, I am his first confirmer truth among you people. We are the first and we are the last, and we are his special ones with distinction, and we are his sincere ones, and I am his cousin, and his successor, and his trustee and possessor of his confidence and secret. I have been given the understanding of the Book, and blessed with sound judgement and decision, and the knowledge about the generations and the relations.
And I am entrusted with a thousand keys, each key opens a thousand chapters, each chapter breaks into a thousand testament, and in addition, I am supported and especially chosen and helped by the Night of Qadr, and that continues for me and my descendants who guard against sins, for as long as the days and the nights subsist, till such time when Allah shall inherit the earth and all who are upon it. I give you glad tidings, O Harith, you shall recognize me at the time of death, and at the Bridge, and at the Pool, and at the time of division."
Al-Harith said: "O my master, what is the time of division?" He said: "Division at the hell-fire, when I will make a correct separation. I shall say: This is my friend, so leave him; this is my adversary, so take him"
Then Ali took al-Harith by his hand and said: "I hold your hand the way the Prophet, held my hand and said 'Surely, on the Day of Judgement, I shall hold the rope of Allah and cling to His safeguard, and you, O Ali, shall hold fast to my safeguard, and your descendants shall cling to your safeguard, and your Shias shall hold fast to the safeguard of all of you.' So what will Allah do to His Prophet? And what will the Prophet do to his successor? (The same shall we do to our followers). Take this, O Harith, the summary of all the details. Yes, you shall be with the one you love, and for you shall be what you have earned." He said this three times.
Then al-Harith stood up, pulling his cloak behind him, and saying: "After this, I care not when Death meets me or I meet it."
