= Badi' al-Zaman al-Hamadani =

Medieval Arab poet and man of letters

- بديع الزمان الهمذاني التغلبي
- Born: 969; Hamadan, Iran
- Died: 1007
- Occupations: Poet, Man of Letters
- Writing career
- Language: Arabic
- Genres: Maqama (prose and poetry)
- Notable work: Maqamat Badi' az-Zaman al-Hamadhani

Badi' al-Zamān al-Hamadānī or al-Hamadhānī (Arabic: بديع الزمان الهمذاني التغلبي; 969 – 1007) was a medieval Arab poet and man of letters. He is best known for his work the Maqamat Badi' az-Zaman al-Hamadhani, a collection of 52 episodic stories of a rogue, Abu al-Fath al-Iskandari, as recounted by a narrator, 'Isa b. Hisham. His nisba, al-Hamadhani, indicates his origin from the city of Hamadan. His laqab, Badi' al-Zaman, translates to “The Wonder of the Age”.

== Life ==
Very little is known about Al-Hamadani’s early life and primary sources are very limited. The main biographical account comes from Al-Tha'alibi, and most later biographies are derived from that. He was born and educated in Hamadan, Iran. While details of his childhood and early education are scarce, historical and contemporary biographical sources state he was of Arab descent, tracing his roots to the Taghlib tribe.

More is known about Al-Hamadani’s adult life. In 380/990, al-Hamadhani, then aged 22, left his native city and began travelling to the various centres of learning. At the time, scholarly travel was an accepted practice for young, educated Arabic men. His first stop was at Rayy, possibly to meet up with his former mentor, Ahmed Ibn Faris (ref: Prendergast gives the instructor’s name as Abdul Husain ibn Faris; See https://archive.org/details/in.ernet.dli.2015.50447/page/n17). There he came under the patronage of Dihkhuda Abu Aid Muhammad ibn Mansur al-Isma (d. 410/1019). He next travelled to Jurjan where he began writing maqamat and where his literary talents found a receptive audience.

In 383/992, he travelled to Khorasan, Nishapur, then under Samanid rule, and an established centre of literature. His experience of Khorasan was mixed. He was robbed several times by highwaymen, losing all of his possessions. However, his literary output became more prolific. He was in competition with al-Khawrizmi and eventually fell out with him. In Nishapur, he achieved great fame and his reputation spread throughout the region.

After Nishapur was conquered by the Ghaznavids he departed the region and returned to his travels. On the road, he stopped at Sarakhs, Tus and Marw. Some early sources, such as the Arab scholar Al-Tha'alibi, suggest that Al-Hamadani also visited Sijistan and Ghazna. However, very little is known of such travels and reliable evidence is thin, leading scholars to caution that, as al-Hamadani’s fame grew, such visits became the stuff of legend.

In 383/993, he stopped at Zaranj, where he was received at the court of the Saffarid ruler, Abu Ahmad Khalaf ibn Ahdmad. Al-Hamadani’s intentions were to eulogise the ruler, for which he was well rewarded.

His movements, following his sojourn in Zaranj, are obscure. He eventually settled in Bushanj, near Herat where he married into the Abu-‘Ali Al-Husayn ibn Muhammad al-Khushnami, a local noble family and spent his final years. His literary output declined during his period of residency at Herat. After he settled in Herat, he came under the protection of Abu'l-Hasan Isfaraini, who was the vizier of Mahmud of Ghazni, the sultan of the Ghaznavid dynasty. He died at Herat, at the age of forty. He was renowned for a remarkable memory and for fluency of speech, as well as for the purity of his language.

His letters were first published at Constantinople (1881), and with commentary at Beirut (1890); his maqamas at Constantinople, and with commentary at Beirut (1889). Selected letters have been published in works, such as Silvestre de Sacy's edition of six of the maqamas with French translation and notes in his Chrestomathie arabe, vol. iii. (2nd ed., Paris, 1827). A specimen of the translated letters can be found A. von Kremers Culturgeschichte des Orients, ii. 470 sqq (in German).

== Literary work ==
Al-Hamadani wrote poetry and many of his letters have survived. He is generally regarded as the originator of the genre known as ‘’maqama"(sing) or ‘’maqamat’’ (pl). Al-Hamadani’s maqama made use of anecdotes collected in the 9th century by earlier writers, such as al-Jahiz and al-Taniikhi, but had a narrator introduce the anecdote.

Al-Hamadani’s innovation was to apply saj' (an ornate form of rhymed prose), to the retelling of secular anecdotes. Until that time, saj’ had been confined to religious and political works. The form was subsequently imitated by other Arabic poets and writers. A century later, the writer, Al-Hariri of Basra elevated the maqamat into a major literary art form.

Al-Hamadani’s Maqama made use of anecdotes collected in the 9th century by earlier writers, such as al-Jahiz and al-Taniikhi, but had a narrator introduce the anecdote. Al-Hamadani’s innovation was to apply saj’, to the retelling of secular anecdotes. Until that time, saj’ had been confined to religious and political works.

A total of 52 of al-Hamadani’s maqama have been preserved in manuscripts. Each maqama is a complete story, but maqama are often presented in a collection with an overarching theme. Each story has two main characters, the narrator, (usually Isa ibn Hisham) and a protagonist, (usually Abu I-Fath of Alexandria, who is a rogue and a trickster). Other characters, often historical characters, are introduced in different stories. The anecdotes, presented in al-Hamadani’s maqamat played into a growing interest in the activities of Arabic low-life, especially beggars, tricksters and criminals.

The maqama follows a loose structure of seven parts, namely (1) Isnad, (2) general introduction, (3) link (4) episode (the core of the narrative), (5) recognition scene, (6) envoi and (7) finale.

Stylistically, maqama employ Saj', a highly polished and elaborate prose. Parts of the narrative may be written in verse, while other parts are written in unrhymed, literary prose. Most of the verse used by al-Hamadhani was borrowed from notable poets.

== See also ==
- Al-Hamadhani (crater), Crater on Mercury named after him
- Maqamat Badi' al-Zaman al-Hamadhani
- Arabic literature
- Arabic miniature

== Sources ==
- The Maqámát of Badí‘ al-Zamán al-Hamadhání.
- BADĪʿ-AL-ZAMĀN HAMADĀNĪ, Encyclopedia Iranica
