= Michael John Hamdani =

Pakistan Canadian Criminal

Michael John Hamdani is a Pakistani Canadian document forger and immigrant smuggler who has also used the names Amarjit Singh Sangha, Azam Shah, Ranjit Singh and Ahmad Malik. He became publicly known in 2002 after providing authorities with false information that led to a cross-border manhunt for five supposed Middle Eastern terrorism suspects. The alert was later determined to have been based on fabricated claims, and officials were criticised for alarming the public before the information had been verified.

Hamdani was arrested in October 2002 after being found with approximately $600,000 in forged traveller's cheques. He later told prosecutors that five Middle Eastern men had sought false documents from him to travel through Pakistan, the United Kingdom and Canada before entering the United States on 24 December 2002. The claim prompted an FBI alert, but the information was later found to be unreliable. Hamdani was arrested again in January 2008 in Guelph, Ontario, where police alleged that he and several family members were operating a forgery business.

== 2002 terrorism hoax ==
"We need to know why they have been smuggled into the country and what they're doing in the country"

— President George W. Bush

Arrested in October 2002 with $600,000 worth of forged traveler's cheques, Hamdani later told prosecutors that Middle-Eastern men had approached him about acquiring documentation to allow them to travel from Pakistan, to England, to Canada, and finally entering the United States on 24 December. He claimed to have been offered a large sum of money, but denied that he had created the false passports.

By 29 December, the FBI had alerted authorities across the country to be on the lookout, transmitting photographs, names and birthdates of five people provided by Hamdani. The names and ages were Abid Noraiz Ali, 25; Iftikhar Khozmai Ali, 21; Mustafa Khan Owasi, 33; Adil Pervez; 19; and Akbar Jamal, 28. The following day, a woman reported having seen two of the men on a ferry in Vancouver, British Columbia three weeks earlier.

The Toronto Sun stated that the men had arrived at Pearson Airport weeks earlier, and claimed refugee status. Some media outlets began claiming the men had crossed the border in Mohawk Territory, leading to a complaint from natives that they were being unfairly blamed when no evidence supported the claim. On 30 December, anti-terrorism police stormed six locations in Brooklyn and Queens, New York in connection with the investigation.

Several days after the manhunt began, a jeweler in Lahore, Pakistan named Mohammed Asghar came forward to state that one of the photographs was of him, and that he had no idea why it had been released with the name "Mustafa Khan Owasi", or associated with any investigation. Authorities then declined to release the other 14 names, due to the "dubious quality" of the information.

== Later arrests ==
Hamdani was arrested again in January 2008, along with his wife, son, daughter and son-in-law, for continuing to operate his forgery business while living in Guelph, avoiding police in Edmonton, Toronto and Vancouver.
