= Maqamat Badi' az-Zaman al-Hamadhani =

Maqamat Badi' al-Zaman al-Hamadhani (Arabic: مقامات بديع الزمان الهمذاني), are an Arabic collection of stories from the 10th century, written by Badi' al-Zaman al-Hamadani. Of the 400 episodic stories, roughly 52 have survived.

== Description ==
The work consists of a series of anecdotes of social satire written and the narrative concerns the travels of a middle-aged man as he uses his charm and eloquence to swindle his way across the Arabic world.

The work is characterized by the alternation of rhymed prose (sajʿ) and poetry. They are narrated from the point of view of a fictitious character, 'very likely a traveling merchant who has money and time', ʿĪsā ibn Hishām, about the adventures of an eloquent beggar named Abū al-Fatḥ al-Iskandarī'. The Maqamat are also known for their intertextuality and narrative construction.

According to Ailin Qian,

The core of the Hamadhānian maqāmah is dialogue, and al-Hamadhānī, by using techniques such as isnād and framing, simulated some kind of public presentation. Al-Hamadhānī’s efforts to preserve the characteristics of oral performance in his maqāmāt played a great role in creating their prosimetric style.

A century later, these maqamat inspired the maqamat of Al-Hariri of Basra, which in turn inspired the Hebrew Tahkemoni. The Abbasid artist and poet, Yahya Al-Wasiti, who lived in Baghdad in the late Abbasid era (12th to 13th-centuries) and was one of the pre-eminent exponents of the Baghdad School, is known to have transcribed and illustrated the work in 1236-37, Maqamat (also known as the Assemblies or the Sessions).

== Sample ==
One of the numerous riddles in the work, in the rajaz metre, runs as follows:

Pointed is his spearhead, sharp are his teeth,
His progeny are his helpers, dissolving union is his business.
He assails his master, clinging to his moustache;
Inserting his fangs into old and young.
Agreeable, of goodly shape, slim, abstemious.
A shooter, with shafts abundant, around the beard and the moustache.

The answer is 'a comb'.

== Editions and translations ==
- The Maqámát of Badí‘ al-Zamán al-Hamadhání (the original version in Arabic Wikisource)
- Al-Hamadhānī, Badīʿ al-zamān. Dīwān. Edited by ʿAbd al-Wahhāb Raḍwān and Muḥammad Shukrī Afandī al-Makkī. Cairo: Maṭbaʿat al-mawsūʿāt, 1903.
- Al-Hamadhānī, Badīʿ al-zamān. Maqāmāt. Edited by Fārūq Saʿd. Beirut: Dār al-āfāq al-jadīdah, 1982.
- Al-Hamadhānī, Badīʿ al-zamān. Maqāmāt Abī al-Faḍl Badīʿ al-zamān al-Hamadhānī. Edited by Muḥammad ʿAbduh. Beirut: Dār al-Mashriq, 1973.
- W. J. Prendergast (trans.), The Maqāmāt of Badīʿ al-Zamān al-Hamadhānī (London: Luzac, 1915)
- Ahmad, Momtazuddin. Sahl al-Maʿālī fī Sharḥ Maqāmāt Badīʿ az-Zāmān al-Hamadhānī. (Commentary)

== In popular culture ==
In 2001, a television series titled مقامات بديع الزمان الهمذاني was produced and broadcast in the Arab region, adapting a selection of the original episodic stories by al‑Hamadhānī into dramatized episodes. The series followed anecdotes drawn from his maqāmāt, presenting diverse themes—such as satirical competition, philosophical discourse, and social commentary.

== See also ==
- Arabic literature
- Baghdad School
- Maqama
