= Mihran-i Hamadani =

Mihran-i Hamadani, known in Arabic sources as Mihran ibn Mihrbundadh, was a Sasanian military officer from the Mihran family. He was the son of a certain Mihrbandad (also known as Mihrbundadh), who is mentioned in some lines in a poem.

In 633, Mihran was sent on expedition against the invading Muslim Arabs as the commander of a Sasanian army, which included several officers such as Piruz Khosrow, Azadbeh Banegan, Bahman Jadhuyih, and a certain Shahrvaraz, who was related to the prominent Sasanian general and briefly king, Shahrbaraz. This army fought against the Arabs at Battle of Buwayb. Although the brother of the Arab general al-Muthanna ibn Haritha, Mas'ud ibn Haritha, was killed, the battle resulted in a defeat for the Sasanians, and resulted in the death of Mihran and Shahrvaraz.

== Sources ==
- Pourshariati, Parvaneh (2008). Decline and Fall of the Sasanian Empire: The Sasanian-Parthian Confederacy and the Arab Conquest of Iran. London and New York: I.B. Tauris. ISBN 978-1-84511-645-3.
- Zarrinkub, Abd al-Husain (1975). "The Arab conquest of Iran and its aftermath". The Cambridge History of Iran, Volume 4: From the Arab Invasion to the Saljuqs. Cambridge: Cambridge University Press. pp. 1–57. ISBN 978-0-521-20093-6.
