= Al-Hamadhani (crater) =

Crater on Mercury

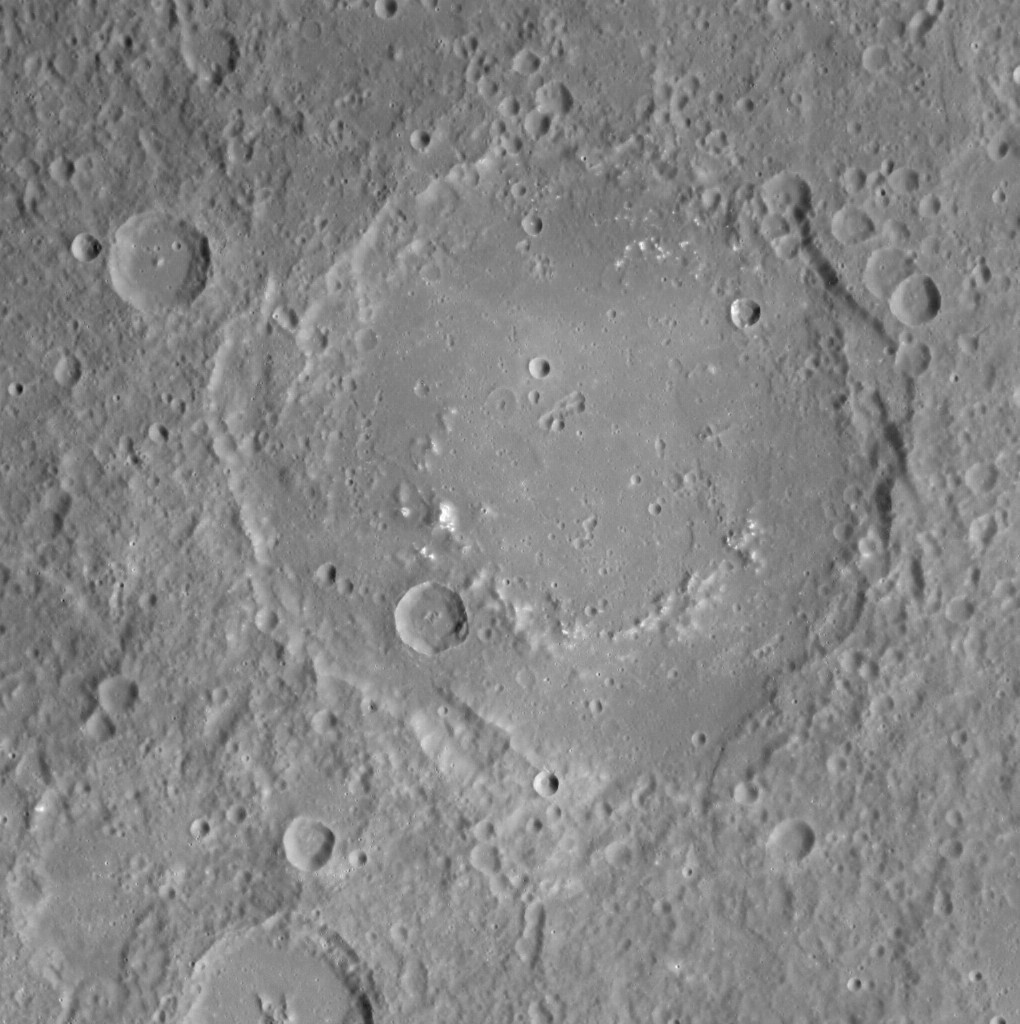
- MESSENGER WAC image. North is in upper left.
- Feature type: Peak-ring impact basin
- Location: Shakespeare quadrangle, Mercury
- Coordinates: 39.19°N 91.76°W
- Diameter: 164 km (102 mi)
- Eponym: Badi' al-Zaman al-Hamadani

Al-Hamadhani is a crater on Mercury. It has a diameter of 186 kilometers. Its name was adopted by the International Astronomical Union in 1979. Al-Hamadhani is named for the Iranian writer Badi' al-Zaman al-Hamadani, who died in 1007 C.E. The crater was first imaged by Mariner 10 in 1974.

Al-Hamadhani is one of 110 peak ring basins on Mercury.

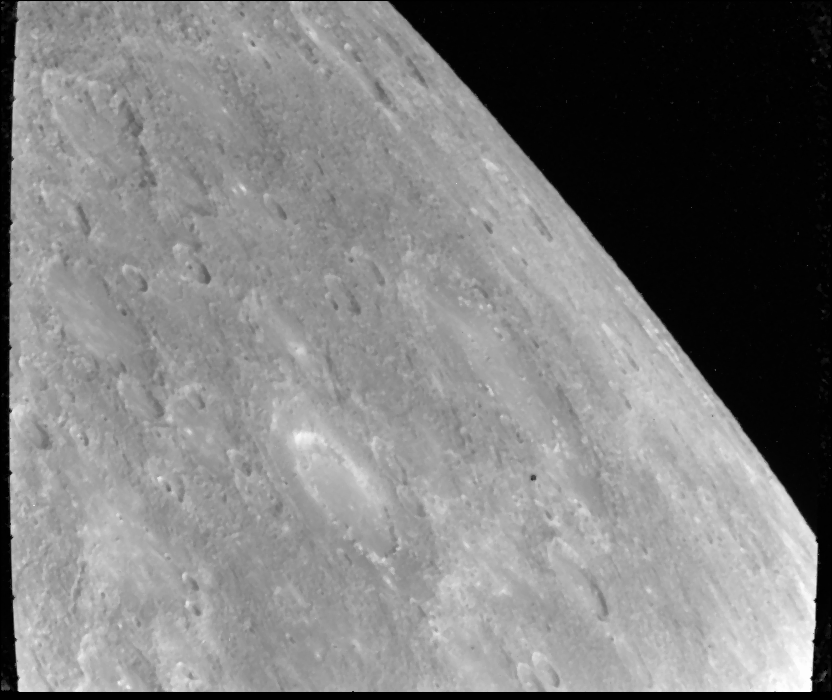
Mariner 10 image with Al-Hamadhani and nearby Scarlatti at center

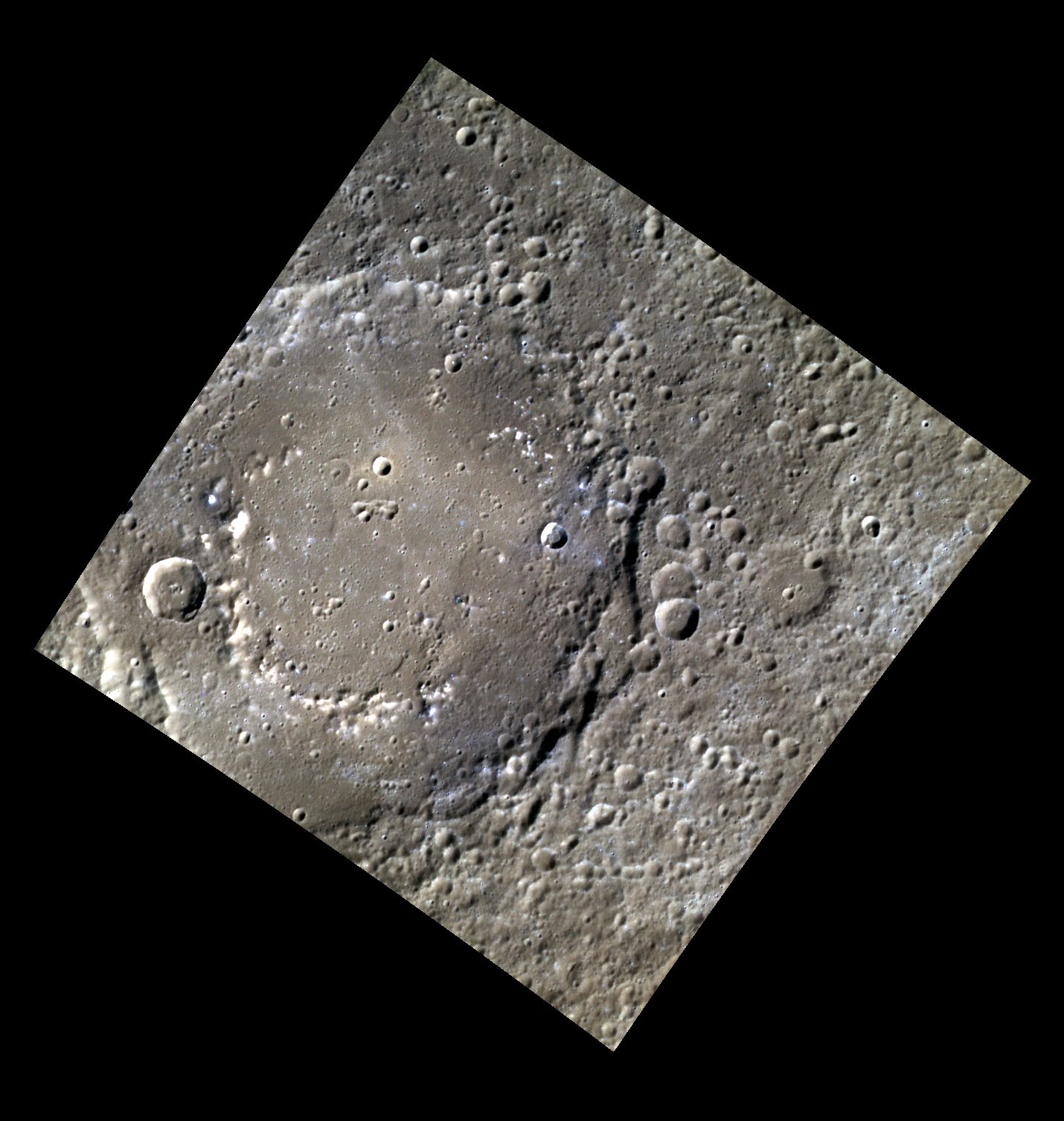
Approximate color image of most of the crater

== Hollows ==
Hollows are present within Al-Hamadhani.

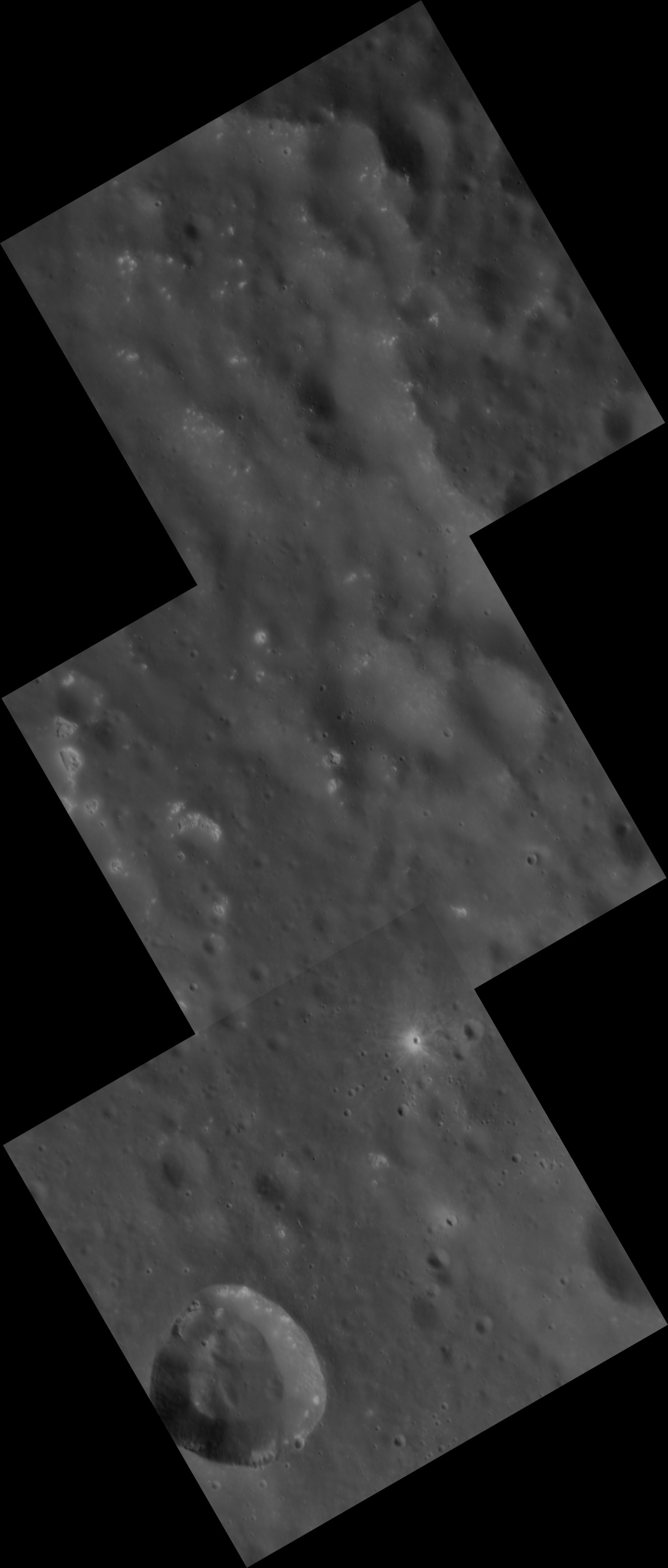
Hollows (irregular bright patches) in eastern Al-Hamadhani crater

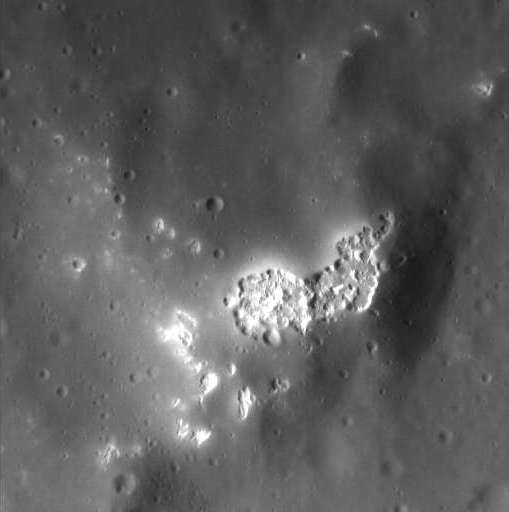
A large patch of hollows on the western peak ring. Image is about 11.7 km wide.

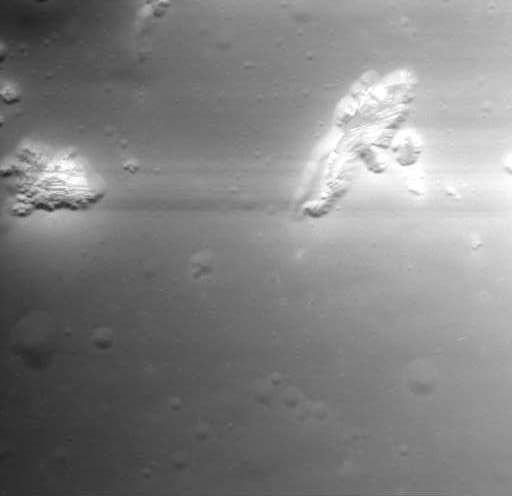
Close-up of some of the small hollows in the image to the left. Image is about 2 km wide.
