= Title I of the Patriot Act =

Title of the USA PATRIOT Act

Title I: Enhancing Domestic Security against Terrorism is the first of ten titles which comprise the USA PATRIOT Act, an anti-terrorism bill passed in the United States after the September 11, 2001 attacks. Title I contains six sections, which, in turn, establish a fund for counterterrorist actions, condemn discrimination against Arab and Muslim Americans, increase funding for the FBI's Technical Support Center, allow for military assistance in some situations involving weapons of mass destruction when requested by the United States Attorney General, expanded the National Electronic Crime Task Force, and expanded the President's authority and abilities in case of terrorism.

== Section 101: Counterterrorism fund ==
Section 101 established a separate and unlimited fund, entitled the "Counterterrorism Fund," within the Department of the Treasury. This fund is to be used to reimburse the Department of Justice for costs required to rebuild an office or facility damaged by terrorism, support counterterrorism efforts (including the paying of rewards), and to pay for terrorism threat assessments. It contains an additional provision to reimburse any U.S. department or agency of all costs related to the detention of individuals in foreign countries who are accused of acts of terrorism. The alleged terrorist can be held without the right to an attorney or the right to remain silent.

== Section 102: Condemnation of discrimination ==
Section 102 was a general statement which confirmed that Arab Americans, Muslim Americans, and Americans from South Asia play a vital role in the United States, and are as equally entitled to full civil rights as any other American. This section further condemned acts of violence against these people that have occurred since the September 11, 2001 attacks, and stated that the responsibility for the 11 September attack lay solely with the individuals who perpetrated them. It also found that "Muslim Americans have become so fearful of harassment that many Muslim women are changing the way they dress to avoid becoming targets" and that "many Arab Americans and Muslim Americans have acted heroically during the attacks on the United States." The Act specifically mentioned Mohammed Salman Hamdani, a 23-year-old New Yorker of Pakistani descent, which the Act states was believed to have gone to the World Trade Center to offer rescue assistance and was believed to have been killed.

This section also reasserted that:

1. the civil rights and civil liberties of all Americans, including Arab Americans, Muslim Americans, and Americans from South Asia, must be protected, and that every effort must be taken to preserve their safety
2. any acts of violence or discrimination against any Americans must be condemned
3. the concept of individual responsibility for wrongdoing is sacrosanct in American society, and applies equally to all religious, racial, and ethnic groups; and
4. the United States is called upon to recognize the patriotism of fellow citizens from all ethnic, racial, and religious backgrounds.

== Section 103: FBI Technical Support Center funding ==
Section 103 increased funding for the FBI's Technical Support Center to $200,000,000 for fiscal years 2002, 2003, and 2004.

== Section 104: Requests for military assistance ==
Section 104 amended title 18 of the United States Code to allow the Attorney General to request assistance from the Department of Defense when weapons of mass destruction are used unlawfully within the United States, or are unlawfully used outside the country by U.S. citizens. Chemical weapons are specifically excluded from the definition of Weapons of Mass Destruction in this section.

== Section 105: Expansion of the NECTF ==
Section 105 charged the Director of the Secret Service with developing a national network of electronic crime task forces, based on New York's Electronic Crimes Task Force model. This network, also known as the National Electronic Crime Task Force (NECTF) is responsible for "preventing, detecting, and investigating electronic crime, including potential terrorist attacks against critical infrastructure and financial payment systems".

== Section 106: Presidential authority ==
Section 106 clarified the President's authority to investigate, regulate, or prohibit any financial transactions that fall within the jurisdiction of the US. This section also authorized the President to confiscate assets belonging to any "foreign person, foreign organization, or foreign country" who the President found had participated in an attack on the United States. Finally, this section ordered that if action under this section is based on classified information, that information may be presented to the reviewing judicial authority ex parte and in camera – that is, outside the presence (and possibly without the knowledge) of the accused or his attorney.
