= Battle of Dayr al-Jamajim =

701 battle in the Umayyad Caliphate

Coordinates: 32.0333°N 44.4000°E

- Part of the Revolt of Ibn al-Ash'ath
Date	703
Location	Central Iraq
Result	Umayyad victory

Belligerents
Umayyad Caliphate	Iraqi rebels

Commanders and leaders
Hajjaj ibn Yusuf	Ibn al-Ash'ath

The Battle of Dayr al-Jamajim ("Battle of the Monastery of Skulls" after a nearby Nestorian monastery), was fought in 701 CE in central Iraq between the largely Syrian Umayyad army under al-Hajjaj ibn Yusuf against the mostly Iraqi followers of Abd al-Rahman ibn Muhammad ibn al-Ash'ath, who had rebelled against al-Hajjaj's overbearing attitude towards the Iraqis.

== Background ==
Initially, Ibn al-Ash'ath managed to drive back al-Hajjaj and even entered Kufa in triumph, leading Caliph Abd al-Malik ibn Marwan to discuss terms with the rebels, which were however rejected by the more hardline rebel leaders. Al-Hajjaj and Ibn al-Ash'ath's troops skirmished with each other for several months before the decisive battle at Dayr al-Jamajim in April 701, where a cavalry charge by the Syrians broke the rebel army. The defeat marked the end of the rebellion, as Ibn al-Ash'ath fled with the remnants of his troops to the east, but also of the power and influence of the Iraqi Arabs: Iraq was garrisoned by Syrian troops and came under tight control by the Syrian-dominated Umayyad government. It was not until the Abbasid period and the foundation of Baghdad that Iraq would regain its prominence.
