= Talat Hamdani =

Pakistani-American commentator and schoolteacher

- Born: 1953 (age 72–73); Karachi, Pakistan
- Occupation: schoolteacher
- Known for: frequently quoted on Muslim-American issues

Talat Hamdani is a Pakistan-born American who became a commentator after her son was killed during Al Qaeda's attacks on September 11, 2001. Her eldest son, Mohammad Salman Hamdani, was a New York Police Department cadet, who had trained as a first responder.

Mourners at her son's funeral included Michael Bloomberg, who was then Mayor of New York, Ray Kelly, then Police Commissioner, and Gary Ackerman, then his Congressional Representative.

Hamdani described growing up in a Karachi that was more liberal than the Pakistan of today, where she was able to play in the schoolyard with boys, ride a bike, and learn to drive. She worked as a school teacher in Pakistan, before immigrating to the US, where she again worked as a school teacher.

In August 2004, the San Francisco Chronicle called Hamdani 'a vehement opponent of the Patriot Act", when they quoted her in an article about critics of George Bush who feared he would use the site of the 9-11 attacks for partisan political purposes during the 2004 Republican Convention. Hamdani has described how her son—a paramedic who had spontaneously made his way to help at the World Trade Center, only to die when the buildings collapsed—was investigated following the attacks.

A small number of the loved ones of those who died during al Qaeda's attack were selected to attend the Guantanamo military commissions of the most senior Guantanamo captives. Talat was one of those chosen.

The King of Jordan invited Hamdani, and the surviving relatives of other American victims of terrorism, to sit beside him when he addressed the United States Congress in March 2007. The theme of the King's speech was the need for the US to play a leadership role in guiding the peace process in the middle east.

In 2010 Hamdani's support of the building of the "ground zero mosque" was widely repeated. Hamdani told the San Diego Union Tribune that she felt Muslims were being unfairly "targeted" for terrorist attacks, when the attacks killed Muslims like her son.

"Why are we paying the price? Why are we being ostracized? Our loved ones died. America was founded on the grounds of religious freedom opposition to the [ground zero mosque] is un-American. It's unethical. And it is wrong."

In April 2010, when forensic specialists began searching through yet another 844 yards of rubble, for bits of bone of 9-11 victims, to see if DNA could be extracted and identified, Hamdani was quoted, questioning the value of the search. Reuters quoted Hamdani calling the search "cruel and inhumane" as it prevented the surviving loved ones to find closure.

On January 4, 2012, Public Radio International reported that her son Mohammad Salman Hamdani was not going to be included on the list of police officers who were killed on 9-11. Spokesmen justified leaving him off the list as he was still a cadet. Talat speculated that his Muslim faith played a role in leaving him off the list.

On November 23, 2015, the New York Daily News published an op-ed from Hamdani, allowing her to respond to Republican Party Presidential aspirant Donald Trump comments on Muslims and public safety. Hamdani asserted that Trump's assertion that he would register all Muslim Americans in a special database, and force them to carry special ID cards, would be inconsistent with the oath of office, where an incoming President swears to defend the United States Constitution. She pointed out:

"The President of the United States, like every member of Congress and every member of the armed forces, takes an oath to defend and uphold the Constitution. Freedom of religion, freedom of speech, the right of assembly and the right to be free from unlawful search are at the heart of our national identity."

She suggested the willingness of Donald Trump, and other candidates, including Ben Carson, Ted Cruz and Marco Rubio, to advocate unconsistutional security measures should disqualify them from serious consideration as presidential candidates.
