= Mohammad Salman Hamdani =

Pakistani-American EMT and victim of the 9/11 attacks (1977–2001)

- محمد سلمان ہمدانی
- Born: December 28, 1977; Karachi, Pakistan
- Died: September 11, 2001 (aged 23); North Tower, World Trade Center, New York City, U.S.
- Cause of death: Collapse of 1 World Trade Center during the September 11 attacks
- Monuments: September 11 Memorial
- Other name: Salman "Sal" Hamdani
- Education: B.S. Biochemistry, 2001
- Alma mater: Queens College
- Occupations: Emergency medical technician, New York Police Department cadet
- Known for: Heroism on 9/11

Mohammad Salman Hamdani (Urdu: محمد سلمان ہمدانی; December 28, 1977 – September 11, 2001) was a Pakistani American New York City Police Department cadet and emergency medical technician who was killed in the collapse of the World Trade Center during 9/11, where he had gone to try to help people. In the weeks following 9/11, reports surfaced that the missing Hamdani was being investigated for possible involvement with the perpetrators, but this suspicion proved to be false and he was subsequently hailed as a hero by the New York City mayor and police commissioner.

Hamdani was mentioned in the 2001 USA PATRIOT Act of the U.S. Congress as an example of Muslim Americans who acted heroically on 9/11. An intersection in Bayside, Queens has been renamed "Salman Hamdani Way" in his memory, and scholarship awards established in his name at Rockefeller University and Queens College in New York.

== Life ==
Salman Hamdani was born in Karachi, Pakistan, and moved to America with his parents when he was 13 months old. The family moved to Bayside, Queens. He had two younger brothers, Adnaan and Zeshan, who were born in the US. His mother, Talat, taught English at a Queens middle school and his father, Saleem, was the owner and operator of a convenience store in Brooklyn until his death on June 26, 2004.

The family lived in Bayside, where Hamdani was on the football team at Bayside High School. He majored in biochemistry at Queens College while working part-time as an emergency medical technician (EMT). He studied abroad in London his junior year before graduating in June 2001. (Note: A picture of Hamdani in the chemistry lab can be found at http://qcpages.qc.edu/~whersh/whh2004sal.html . Note that his research work was included in the article mentioned there: Hersh William H., Xu Ping, Simpson Cheslan K., Grob Jonathan, Bickford Brian, Salman Hamdani Mohammad, Wood Thomas, Rheingold Arnold L. (2004). "Synthesis and Structural Characterization of Trivalent Amino Acid Derived Chiral Phosphorus Compounds". J. Org. Chem. 69 (6): 2153–2163. doi:10.1021/jo035508+. PMID 15058965.) In July he started employment at Rockefeller University, working as a research technician in the Protein/DNA Technology Center in association with the Howard Hughes Medical Institute.

He was determined to get into medical school, but if he was not accepted he wanted to become a detective and apply his scientific knowledge toward forensics. He joined the New York Police Department's (NYPD) cadet program in addition to working at Rockefeller University. The night before September 11, he was working on an application for medical school and helping his father cope with heart disease.

== September 11 and aftermath ==
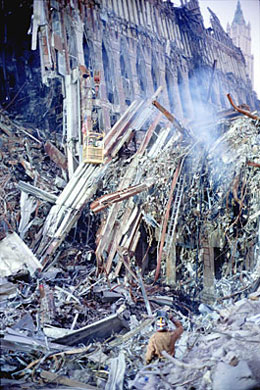
Hamdani's remains were found under the rubble of the North Tower of the World Trade Center in October 2001.

It was believed that on the morning of September 11, 2001, while on the way to work at Rockefeller University, Hamdani witnessed the smoke coming from the Twin Towers and hurried to the scene to aid victims, using his police and EMT identification to get a ride through the restricted traffic. (Note: See red "A" in each of the following linked maps for the location of Bayside, Queens, NY where Hamdani lived; Rockefeller University, where he worked; and the site of the destroyed World Trade Center where he went to aid victims and died.)

Hamdani was reported as missing; his family feared he had gone to the World Trade Center in an attempt to help as an EMT, but held out hope he was being secretly held by the government because of his religion. His mother wrote to President George W. Bush to plead for his help. In the weeks following the attack, investigators from the FBI and NYPD began questioning the family about Hamdani. His mother said US Representative Gary Ackerman, whose congressional district included Queens, was among the officials who came to the family's Bayside home to ask questions about her son, including what his motives were for becoming a police cadet, which Internet chat rooms he visited and why he had been in London. According to the family, CIA officials came to help find their missing son. They confiscated a college graduation photo of Hamdani posing with a student from Afghanistan.

Media began to report that Hamdani's disappearance was under investigation. Reporters appeared at the family's home, and the New York Post published a story about him entitled, "Missing or Hiding? — Mystery of NYPD Cadet from Pakistan." Anonymous "Wanted" posters were distributed featuring Hamdani's NYPD cadet photo and the phrase "Hold and detain. Notify: major case squad," while some of the family's own missing posters were torn down.

In October 2001, remains of a body, along with Hamdani's medical bag and identification, were found in the wreckage of the North Tower at Ground Zero. He was declared a hero by Congress that October, 45 days after the attacks. He was cited in the USA PATRIOT Act, signed into law on October 26, 2001, in Title 1, section 102:

Many Arab Americans and Muslim Americans have acted heroically during the attacks on the United States, including Mohammed (sic) Salman Hamdani, a 23-year-old New Yorker of Pakistani descent, who is believed to have gone to the World Trade Center to offer rescue assistance and is now missing.

— "Sense of Congress condemning discrimination against Arab and Muslim Americans," 2001 USA PATRIOT Act

Hamdani's remains were positively identified through a DNA match in March 2002.

== Legacy ==
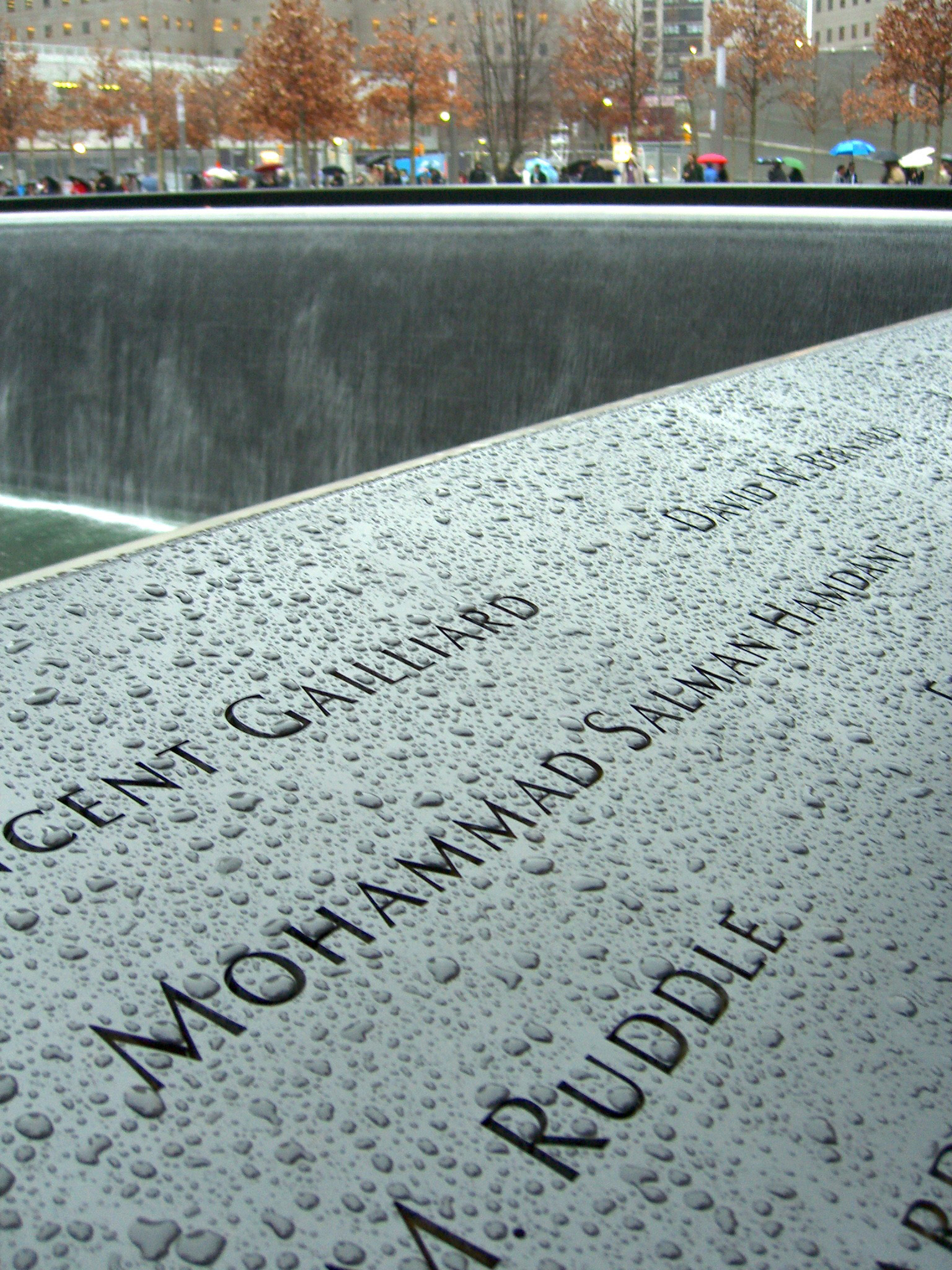
Hamdani's name is located on Panel S-66 of the National September 11 Memorial's South Pool.

On April 5, 2002, shortly after his remains were identified, Hamdani was hailed as a hero by Mayor Michael Bloomberg, New York Police Commissioner Raymond Kelly and Rep. Ackerman at a police funeral attended by 500 people at the Islamic Cultural Center of New York. Bloomberg called him "an example of how one can make the world better."

On March 10, 2011, Minnesota Congressman Keith Ellison, in his testimony before the House of Representatives' Committee on Homeland Security for its hearing, "The Extent of Radicalization in the American Muslim Community and That Community's Response," cited Hamdani as being falsely accused of being involved in the attacks only because he was a Muslim.

In 2002, Rockefeller University established a memorial scholarship fund in Hamdani's name for outstanding Pakistani-American students. In 2011, the Queens College Foundation announced the Salman Hamdani Memorial Award, to be presented to a graduating senior who has been accepted to medical school, has shown interest in Pakistani culture and needs financial assistance. The award was his mother's way of keeping Salman's dream alive; "This is his legacy. He gave his life. They tried to take away his dignity in death and they cannot do it," Talat said.

On April 28, 2014, the corner of 204th Street and 35th Avenue in Bayside was renamed "Salman Hamdani Way". Councilman Paul Vallone, musician and activist Salman Ahmad, State Assemblyman Edward Braunstein and local residents attended the ceremony along with Hamdani's family members.

Also in 2014, Hamdani won the Unity Productions Foundation's "Noor Inayat Khan Courage Award."

In 2023, a documentary about Hamdani entitled American Jedi: The Salman Hamdani Story was released by Alexander Street.

== Memorial controversy ==
At the National September 11 Memorial, Hamdani is memorialized at the South Pool, on Panel S-66. Despite the fact that he was found under the rubble of the North Tower, his name is not included at the North Pool among the other North Tower victims. The New York Times noted that his name is on the final panel at the memorial, "with the names of others who did not fit into the rubrics the memorial created to give placements meaning. That section is for those who had only a loose connection, or none, to the World Trade Center."

Hamdani's mother, Talat, expressed disappointment that his name is among the non-first responder victims at the memorial and not in the separate area for the first responders.

"[On his way to work on Sept. 11] he must have seen the flames at the World Trade Center from the elevated train, then rushed downtown to try to help. He did not make that decision and take that fatal detour as a lab analyst, but as the first responder he was trained to be," Talat said.

A memorial spokesperson said that Hamdani was included with other non-first responders as he was not an active member of the NYPD, and he had not received the 9/11 Heroes Medal of Valor, the museum's criterion to be classified as a first responder. However, the NYPD gave him a police funeral with full honors and presented his family with a police shield on the first anniversary of the attacks.

In a January 2012 article, Hamdani's mother Talat stated that she planned to continue to lobby for Hamdani to be recognized as a first responder.
