= Sa'id ibn Qays al-Hamdani =

Governor and commander

Sa'id ibn Qays al-Hamdani (Arabic: سعيد بن قيس الهمداني) was a governor and commander during the reigns of caliphs Uthman and Ali and a tribal chief of the South Arabian Hamdan and Himyarite tribesmen of Kufa during this period and under the first Umayyad caliphs.

== Life ==
Sa'id ibn Qays belonged to the Sabi' branch of the South Arabian Hamdan tribe and was a purported descendant of a Himyarite king. This ancestor, Zayd ibn Marib ibn Ma'dikarib, was noted by the South Arabian tradition for having killed and replaced the king of the Bawn region of northern Yemen during the pre-Islamic period (pre-7th century).

Sa'id fought in the early Muslim conquests and became one of the leading tribal nobles of Kufa, one of the two main Arab garrison towns of Iraq. During the reign of Caliph Uthman (r. 644–656), he served as governor of Rayy and Hamadhan in Iran. Under Uthman's Iraq-based successor, Caliph Ali (r. 656–661), he led the Hamdani and Himyarite contingent of the caliph's Kufan forces during the First Muslim Civil War. In this capacity, he led his men in the battles of the Camel (656) near Basra and Siffin (657) on the frontier of Syria, as well as another campaign under Ali in 661. He is mentioned as one of the chiefs of the Yaman (South Arabians) during the reigns of the Umayyad caliphs Mu'awiya I (r. 661–680) and Yazid I (r. 680–683).

== Descendants ==
Sa'id was the maternal grandfather of the Kufan tribal noble, prominent commander and rebel leader Ibn al-Ash'ath. During the Second Muslim Civil War (683–692), when the Umayyads lost control of Iraq, Sa'id's son Abd al-Rahman served as a governor under the Kufan rebel ruler al-Mukhtar but defected to the Zubayrid ruler of Basra, Mus'ab ibn al-Zubayr. He was killed during the latter's attempt to wrest control of Kufa from al-Mukhtar. Abd al-Rahman's son, Muhammad, lacked his father's and grandfather's authority over the Hamdan, who mostly sided with al-Mukhtar, and he and Ibn al-Ash'ath harshly punished al-Mukhtar's Kufan supporters when they conquered Kufa in 686. Muhammad later defected to the Umayyad caliph Abd al-Malik (r. 685–705), while another grandson of Sa'id, Jarir ibn Hashim, joined Ibn al-Ash'ath's rebellion against Abd al-Malik in 700–701.

== Bibliography ==
- Crone, Patricia (1980). Slaves on Horses: The Evolution of the Islamic Polity. Cambridge: Cambridge University Press. ISBN 0-521-52940-9.
- Muhammad ibn Habib (2021). Gelder, G. J. H. (ed.). Prominent Murder Victims of the Pre- and Early Islamic Periods Including the Names of Murdered Poets: Introduced, Edited, Translated from the Arabic, and Annotated. Leiden: Brill. ISBN 978-90-04-44634-2.
- Hinds, Martin, ed. (1990). The History of al-Ṭabarī, Volume XXIII: The Zenith of the Marwānid House: The Last Years of ʿAbd al-Malik and the Caliphate of al-Walīd, A.D. 700–715/A.H. 81–95. SUNY Series in Near Eastern Studies. Albany, New York: State University of New York Press. ISBN 978-0-88706-721-1.
