= Banu Hamdan =

Yemeni tribal group

Banu Hamdan بنو همدان
- Kahlanite Arab tribe
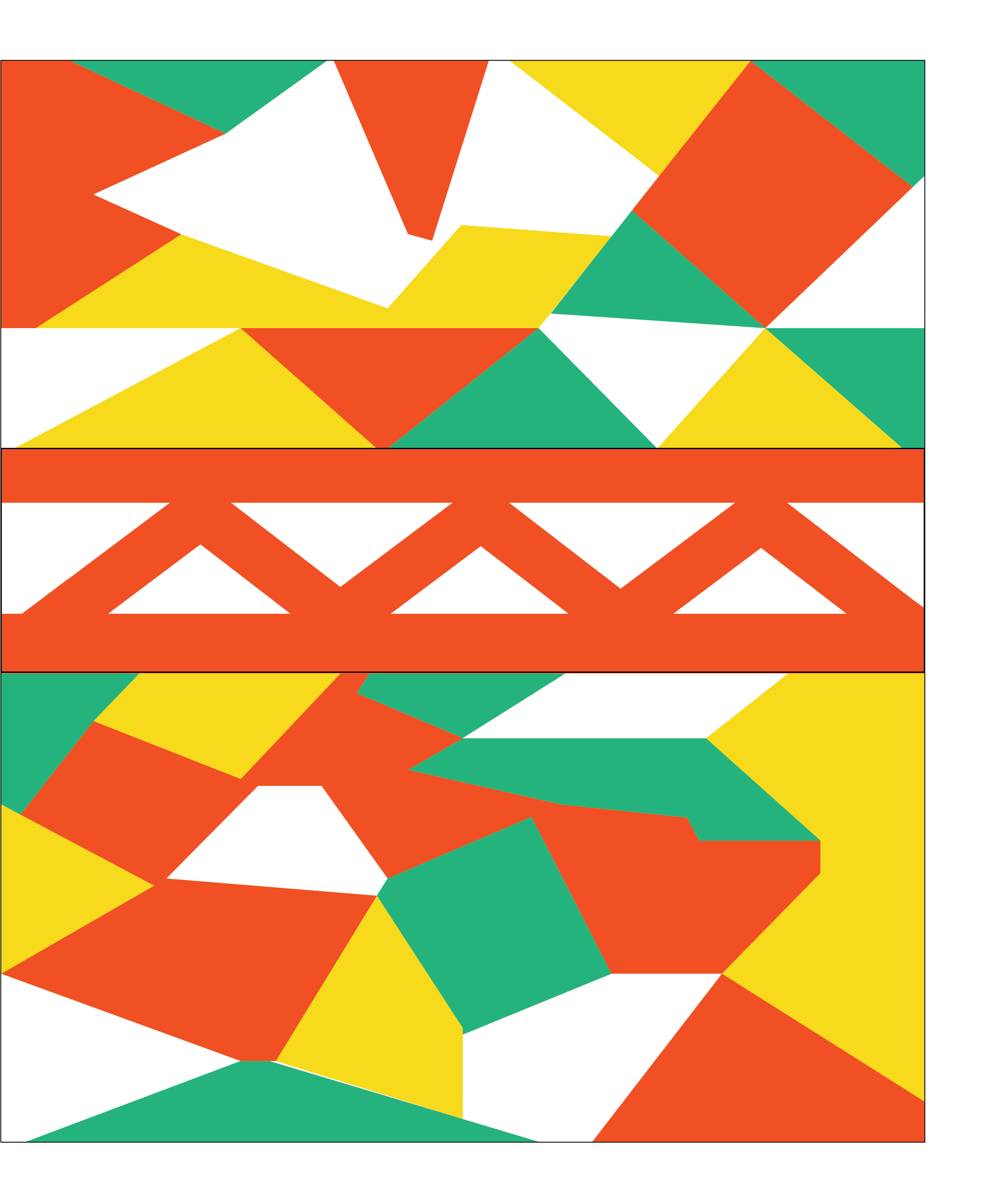
- Banner of Banu Hamdan during the battle of Siffin
- Ethnicity: Arab
- Nisba: Al-Hamdani
- Location: Yemen (Main); Lebanon (branch); Saudi Arabia (branch)
- Descended from: Banu Hamdan
- Branches: Hashid; Banu Yam; Banu Murra; Banu Ajam; Banu Al-Mashrouki; Bakil; Banu Hut

Banu Hamdan (Arabic: بَنُو هَمْدَان; is an ancient, large, and prominent Arab tribe in northern Yemen.

== Origins and location ==
The Hamdan stemmed from the eponymous progenitor Awsala (nickname Hamdan) whose descent is traced back to the semi-legendary Kahlan. Their abode was, and still is, in northern Yemen, in the region north of Sanaa extending toward Marib and Najran to the east, Saada to the north and to the Red Sea coast to the west. In its most broad definition, the Hamdan group also includes the Hashid and Bakil groups, while in the most narrow it includes only a portion of Hashid that still uses the name "Hamdan" for itself. Until the present day, the Bakil branch dominates the eastern part of this territory, and the Hashid branch dominates the western part. Parts of the Hamdan migrated through different parts of the Islamic world, where they eventually became dispersed, though they formed a distinct community in the Arab garrison town of Kufa, established following the Muslim conquest of Iraq in the 630s.

== History ==
The Hamdan was mentioned in Sabaic inscriptions as qayls of Hashid, who later acquired control over a part of Bakil and finally gave their clan name to tribal confederations including Hashid and Bakil.

At least a portion of the Hamdan sent a deputation, led by the poet Malik ibn Namat and the prince Abu Thawr Dhu'l-Mashar, to the Islamic prophet Muhammad in 631 seeking an alliance with him. More Hamdani tribesmen submitted to Islam during the expedition to the Yemen led by Muhammad's cousin and son-in-law Ali in 631 or 632. Muhammad placed the Bakil tribesman as his deputy over the Hamdan. The tribe largely remained loyal to the early Muslim state during the Ridda wars which broke out following Muhammad's death in 632.

The Hamdani soldiers who settled in Kufa during and after the Muslim conquest of Iraq became fervent supporters of Ali during his caliphate in 656–661, and his sons Hasan and Husayn after him. During the Battle of Siffin in 657, they contributed some 12,000 men to Ali's army against his opponent Mu'awiya ibn Abi Sufyan of Syria, and their leader, Sa'id ibn Qays al-Hamdani, played a prominent role in the battle. Other notable members in Kufa during the following period included Amir ibn Shahr and the poet A'sha Hamdan.

The conversion of the Hamdan by Ali, and their subsequent close association with him, has led the Hamdan to be historically close to Shi'a Islam, initially espousing Isma'ilism, and eventually becoming partisans of Zaydism.

== Branches ==
=== Hashid and Bakil ===
Today still in the same ancient tribal form in Yemen, Hashid and Bakil of Hamdan remain in the highlands of Upper Yemen living in Sana'a in the south to and including Sa'ada in the north, living in al-Jawf in the east to Hajjah in the west, including 'Amran in between.

The two groups have existed for over a millennium, and as of 2018 numbered over a million members. Historically they have dominated northern Yemen, although sometimes at odds with each other. They became supporters of Yemeni Zaydism, being dubbed "the wings of the imamate", but exchanged their support for wide-ranging autonomy for themselves. The Hashid are divided into seven major tribes—al-Usaymat, Idhar, Kharif, Bani Suraym, Sanhan, and Hamdan—while the more scattered and less organized Bakil into over fifteen major tribes.

=== Banu Yam ===
Banu Yam settled to the north of Bakil in Najran (today in Saudi Arabia). It also branched into the tribes: the 'Ujman plural of "AlAjmi" who inhabited eastern Saudi Arabia and the Arabic Gulf coast.

The Hatim family, which led the Yam, established the Isma'ili Hamdanid dynasty at Sanaa at the turn of the 12th century, in rivalry to the Sulayhids. From the 12th century on, the Hamdanids began to shift towards acceptance of the Zaydi Imams of Yemen.

=== Banu Kharf ===
Banu kharf They are from the Hamdan tribes and live in northern Yemen, specifically in the governorate of Amran, and they migrated to Muhammad in order to announce their Islam and their sheikh is a Mujahid

=== Banu Kathir ===
Banu Kathiri from Hadramut in the East of Yemen where they established their own sultanate.

=== Banu Al-Mashrouki ===
Banu Al-Mashrouki settled in Lebanon producing well known Maronite influential families such as the Awwad, Massa'ad, Al-Sema'ani, Hasroun.

=== Banu Al Harith ===
Banu Al Harith remained in Jabal Amil and were mainly Shia. A smaller group joined the Yemeni Druze and were eventually pushed by Kaysi Druze to Jabal Al Druze in Syria.

== Bibliography ==
- Andrey Korotayev. Ancient Yemen. Oxford: Oxford University Press, 1995. ISBN 0-19-922237-1

== Bibliography ==
- Schleifer, J. & Watt, W. Montgomery (1971). "Hamdān". In Lewis, B.; Ménage, V. L.; Pellat, Ch. & Schacht, J. (eds.). The Encyclopaedia of Islam, Second Edition. Volume III: H–Iram. Leiden: E. J. Brill. p. 123. OCLC 495469525.
- Schmitz, Charles; Burrowes, Robert D. (2018). Historical Dictionary of Yemen (Third ed.). Lanham, Maryland: Rowman & Littlefield. ISBN 9781538102329.
